= -bacter =

Suffix used in microbiology

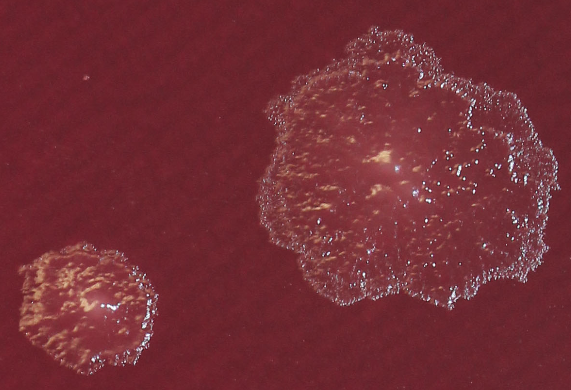
Turicibacter Colony

The suffix -bacter is used in microbiology for many genera and is intended to mean "bacteria".

== Meaning ==
Bacter is a Neo-Latin (i.e. Modern Latin) term coined from bacterium, which in turn derives from the Greek βακτήριον, meaning small staff (diminutive of βακτηρία). Consequently, it formally means "rod". It differs from the suffix -bacterium in grammatical gender, as the suffix -bacter is male, whereas the suffix -bacterium) is neuter; this was decided in Juridical (or Judicial) Opinion n° 3 of the Bacteriological Code.

Nevertheless, for historical reasons, two archaeal species finish in -bacter: Methanobrevibacter and Methanothermobacter.

== Usage ==
Juridical Opinion n° 2 in the Bacteriological Code discusses the declension of the word, given that authors differently assumed the genitive case of bacter to be bactris (3rd declension words of Latin origin ending in =ter), bacteri (2nd declension) or bacteris (3rd declension, used for words of Greek origin, such as astris). The Opinion opts for the latter: consequently, higher taxa are formed with the stem =bacter- and not =bactr-. In Juridical Opinion n° 3 it was established to be masculine. For example, Campylobacter is a genus of Campylobacterales. These rules were established so that the specific epithets were paired with the correct gender as imposed by the Bacteriological Code and the correct higher taxon names were formed. An interesting effect of this is that the genus Fibrobacter gives its name both to the phylum Fibrobacteres, which obeys Latin grammar, and to the class Fibrobacteria, which follows the recommendation of using the suffix -ia

== Genera ==
Genus	Phylum	Class	Order	Family
Acanthopleuribacter	Acidobacteriota	Holophagae	Acanthopleuribacterales	Acanthopleuribacteraceae
Acetobacter	Pseudomonadota	Alphaproteobacteria	Rhodospirillales	Acetobacteraceae
Achromobacter	Pseudomonadota	Betaproteobacteria	Burkholderiales	Alcaligenaceae
Acidaminobacter	Bacillota	Clostridia	Clostridiales	Clostridiaceae
Acinetobacter	Pseudomonadota	Gammaproteobacteria	Pseudomonadales	Moraxellaceae
Actibacter	Bacteroidota	Flavobacteria	Flavobacteriales	Flavobacteriaceae
Adhaeribacter	Bacteroidota	Sphingobacteria	Sphingobacteriales	Cytophagaceae
Aestuariibacter	Pseudomonadota	Gammaproteobacteria	Alteromonadales	Alteromonadaceae
Aggregatibacter	Pseudomonadota	Gammaproteobacteria	Pasteurellales	Pasteurellaceae
Albibacter	Pseudomonadota	Alphaproteobacteria	Hyphomicrobiales	Methylocystaceae
Algibacter	Bacteroidota	Flavobacteria	Flavobacteriales	Flavobacteriaceae
Alkalibacter	Bacillota	Clostridia	Clostridiales	Eubacteriaceae
Alkanibacter	Pseudomonadota	Gammaproteobacteria	Nevskiales	Nevskiaceae
Altererythrobacter	Pseudomonadota	Alphaproteobacteria	Sphingomonadales	Erythrobacteraceae
Aminobacter	Pseudomonadota	Alphaproteobacteria	Hyphomicrobiales	Phyllobacteriaceae
Amoebobacter	Pseudomonadota	Gammaproteobacteria	Chromatiales	Chromatiaceae
Anaerobacter	Bacillota	Clostridia	Clostridiales	Clostridiaceae
Anaeromyxobacter	Myxococcota	Myxococcia	Myxococcales	Myxococcaceae
Anaerosporobacter	Bacillota	Clostridia	Clostridiales	Clostridiaceae
Ancylobacter	Pseudomonadota	Alphaproteobacteria	Hyphomicrobiales	Xanthobacteraceae
Angustibacter	Actinomycetota	Actinomycetia	Actinomycetales	Kineosporiaceae
Antarctobacter	Pseudomonadota	Alphaproteobacteria	Rhodobacterales	Rhodobacteraceae
Aquabacter	Pseudomonadota	Alphaproteobacteria	Hyphomicrobiales	Hyphomicrobiaceae
Arcobacter	Campylobacterota	Campylobacteria	Campylobacterales	Campylobacteraceae
Arenibacter	Bacteroidota	Flavobacteria	Flavobacteriales	Flavobacteriaceae
Arthrobacter	Actinomycetota	Actinomycetia	Actinomycetales	Micrococcaceae
Asaccharobacter	Actinomycetota	Actinomycetia	Coriobacteriales	Coriobacteriaceae
Atopobacter	Bacteroidota	Bacilli	Lactobacillales	Carnobacteriaceae
Auritidibacter	Actinomycetota	Actinomycetia	Actinomycetales	Micrococcaceae
Azotobacter	Pseudomonadota	Gammaproteobacteria	Pseudomonadales	Pseudomonadaceae
Blastobacter	Pseudomonadota	Alphaproteobacteria	Hyphomicrobiales	Nitrobacteraceae
Bryobacter	Acidobacteriota	Acidobacteriia		
Caedibacter	Pseudomonadota	Gammaproteobacteria	Thiotrichales	
Caldanaerobacter	Bacillota	Clostridia	Thermoanaerobacterales	Thermoanaerobacteraceae
Caldicoprobacter	Bacillota	Clostridia	Clostridiales	Caldicoprobacteraceae
Caloranaerobacter	Bacillota	Clostridia	Clostridiales	Clostridiaceae
Caminibacter	Campylobacterota	Nautiliia	Nautiliales	Nautiliaceae
Campylobacter	Campylobacterota	Campylobacteria	Campylobacterales	Campylobacteraceae
Caseobacter	Actinomycetota	Actinomycetia	Actinomycetales	Corynebacteriaceae
Caulobacter	Pseudomonadota	Alphaproteobacteria	Caulobacterales	Caulobacteraceae
Celeribacter	Pseudomonadota	Alphaproteobacteria	Rhodobacterales	Rhodobacteraceae
Chelatobacter	Pseudomonadota	Alphaproteobacteria	Hyphomicrobiales	Rhizobiaceae
Chelonobacter	Pseudomonadota	Gammaproteobacteria	Pasteurellales	Pasteurellaceae
Chitinibacter	Pseudomonadota	Betaproteobacteria	Neisseriales	Neisseriaceae
Chromohalobacter	Pseudomonadota	Gammaproteobacteria	Oceanospirillales	Halomonadaceae
Citrobacter	Pseudomonadota	Gammaproteobacteria	Enterobacteriales	Enterobacteriaceae
Clavibacter	Actinomycetota	Actinomycetia	Actinomycetales	Microbacteriaceae
Clostridiisalibacter	Bacillota	Clostridia	Clostridiales	Clostridiaceae
Cohaesibacter	Pseudomonadota	Alphaproteobacteria	Hyphomicrobiales	Cohaesibacteraceae
Conexibacter	Actinomycetota	Actinomycetia	Solirubrobacterales	Conexibacteraceae
Congregibacter	Pseudomonadota	Gammaproteobacteria		
Coprothermobacter	Coprothermobacterota	Coprothermobacteria	Coprothermobacterales	Coprothermobacteraceae
Croceibacter	Bacteroidota	Flavobacteria	Flavobacteriales	Flavobacteriaceae
Cronobacter	Pseudomonadota	Gammaproteobacteria	Enterobacteriales	Enterobacteriaceae
Cryptanaerobacter	Bacillota	Clostridia	Clostridiales	Peptococcaceae
Cucumibacter	Pseudomonadota	Alphaproteobacteria	Hyphomicrobiales	Hyphomicrobiaceae
Curvibacter	Pseudomonadota	Betaproteobacteria	Burkholderiales	Comamonadaceae
Cystobacter	Myxococcota	Myxococcia	Myxococcales	Cystobacteraceae
Deferribacter	Deferribacterota	Deferribacteres	Deferribacterales	Deferribacteraceae
Defluvibacter	Pseudomonadota	Alphaproteobacteria	Hyphomicrobiales	Phyllobacteriaceae
Dehalobacter	Bacillota	Clostridia	Clostridiales	Peptococcaceae
Deinobacter	Deinococcota	Deinococci	Deinococcales	Deinococcaceae
Dendrosporobacter	Bacillota	Negativicutes	Selenomonadales	Veillonellaceae
Dermabacter	Actinomycetota	Actinomycetia	Actinomycetales	Dermabacteraceae
Desertibacter	Pseudomonadota	Alphaproteobacteria	Rhodospirillales	Rhodospirillaceae
Desulfitibacter	Bacillota	Clostridia	Clostridiales	Peptococcaceae
Desulfobacter	Thermodesulfobacteriota	Desulfobacteria	Desulfobacterales	Desulfobacteraceae
Dethiobacter	Bacillota	Clostridia	Clostridiales	Syntrophomonadaceae
Dethiosulfatibacter	Bacillota	Clostridia	Clostridiales	
Diaphorobacter	Pseudomonadota	Betaproteobacteria	Burkholderiales	Comamonadaceae
Dichelobacter	Pseudomonadota	Gammaproteobacteria	Cardiobacteriales	Cardiobacteriaceae
Dinoroseobacter	Pseudomonadota	Alphaproteobacteria	Rhodobacterales	Rhodobacteraceae
Dyadobacter	Bacteroidota	Sphingobacteria	Sphingobacteriales	Cytophagaceae
Edaphobacter	Acidobacteriota	Acidobacteriia	Acidobacteriales	Acidobacteriaceae
Effluviibacter	Bacteroidota	Sphingobacteria	Sphingobacteriales	Cytophagaceae
Empedobacter	Bacteroidota	Flavobacteria	Flavobacteriales	Flavobacteriaceae
Enhydrobacter	Pseudomonadota	Gammaproteobacteria	Pseudomonadales	Moraxellaceae
Enterobacter	Pseudomonadota	Gammaproteobacteria	Enterobacteriales	Enterobacteriaceae
Erythrobacter	Pseudomonadota	Alphaproteobacteria	Sphingomonadales	Erythrobacteraceae
Fabibacter	Bacteroidota	Sphingobacteria	Sphingobacteriales	Flammeovirgaceae
Ferruginibacter	Bacteroidota	Sphingobacteria	Sphingobacteriales	Chitinophagaceae
Fibrobacter	Fibrobacterota	Fibrobacteria	Fibrobacterales	Fibrobacteraceae
Filibacter	Bacillota	Bacilli	Bacillales	Planococcaceae
Flavihumibacter	Bacteroidota	Sphingobacteria	Sphingobacteriales	Chitinophagaceae
Flavisolibacter	Bacteroidota	Sphingobacteria	Sphingobacteriales	Chitinophagaceae
Flexibacter	Bacteroidota	Sphingobacteria	Sphingobacteriales	Cytophagaceae
Fluoribacter	Pseudomonadota	Gammaproteobacteria	Legionellales	Legionellaceae
Fodinibacter	Actinomycetota	Actinomycetia	Actinomycetales	Intrasporangiaceae
Fontibacter	Bacteroidota	Sphingobacteria	Sphingobacteriales	Cyclobacteriaceae
Fulvibacter	Bacteroidota	Flavobacteria	Flavobacteriales	Flavobacteriaceae
Fundibacter	Pseudomonadota	Gammaproteobacteria	Oceanospirillales	Alcanivoracaceae
Fusibacter	Bacillota	Clostridia	Clostridiales	
Gaetbulibacter	Bacteroidota	Flavobacteria	Flavobacteriales	Flavobacteriaceae
Galbibacter	Bacteroidota	Flavobacteria	Flavobacteriales	Flavobacteriaceae
Gelidibacter	Bacteroidota	Flavobacteria	Flavobacteriales	Flavobacteriaceae
Gemmobacter	Pseudomonadota	Alphaproteobacteria	Rhodobacterales	Rhodobacteraceae
Geoalkalibacter	Thermodesulfobacteriota	Desulfuromonadia	Desulfuromonadales	Geobacteraceae
Geobacter	Thermodesulfobacteriota	Desulfuromonadia	Desulfuromonadales	Geobacteraceae
Geopsychrobacter	Thermodesulfobacteriota	Desulfuromonadia	Desulfuromonadales	Geobacteraceae
Geosporobacter	Bacillota	Clostridia	Clostridiales	Clostridiaceae
Geothermobacter	Thermodesulfobacteriota	Desulfuromonadia	Desulfuromonadales	Geobacteraceae
Gilvibacter	Bacteroidota	Flavobacteria	Flavobacteriales	Flavobacteriaceae
Glaciibacter	Actinomycetota	Actinomycetia	Actinomycetales	Microbacteriaceae
Gluconacetobacter	Pseudomonadota	Alphaproteobacteria	Rhodospirillales	Acetobacteraceae
Gluconobacter	Pseudomonadota	Alphaproteobacteria	Rhodospirillales	Acetobacteraceae
Gordonibacter	Actinomycetota	Actinomycetia	Coriobacteriales	Coriobacteriaceae
Gracilibacter	Bacillota	Clostridia	Clostridiales	Gracilibacteraceae
Granulibacter	Pseudomonadota	Alphaproteobacteria	Rhodospirillales	Acetobacteraceae
Gulosibacter	Actinomycetota	Actinomycetia	Actinomycetales	Microbacteriaceae
Haematobacter	Pseudomonadota	Alphaproteobacteria	Rhodobacterales	Rhodobacteraceae
Halanaerobacter	Bacillota	Clostridia	Halanaerobiales	Halobacteroidaceae
Halarsenatibacter	Bacillota	Clostridia	Halanaerobiales	Halanaerobiaceae
Haliscomenobacter	Bacteroidota	Sphingobacteria	Sphingobacteriales	Saprospiraceae
Helicobacter	Campylobacterota	Campylobacteria	Campylobacterales	Helicobacteraceae
Humibacter	Actinomycetota	Actinomycetia	Actinomycetales	Microbacteriaceae
Hydrogenobacter	Aquificota	Aquificae	Aquificales	Aquificaceae
Hymenobacter	Bacteroidota	Sphingobacteria	Sphingobacteriales	Cytophagaceae
Ilumatobacter	Actinomycetota	Actinomycetia	Acidimicrobiales	Acidimicrobiaceae
Ilyobacter	Fusobacteriota	Fusobacteriia	Fusobacteriales	Fusobacteriaceae
Indibacter	Bacteroidota	Sphingobacteria	Sphingobacteriales	Cyclobacteriaceae
Iodobacter	Pseudomonadota	Betaproteobacteria	Neisseriales	Neisseriaceae
Janibacter	Actinomycetota	Actinomycetia	Actinomycetales	Intrasporangiaceae
Koreibacter	Actinomycetota	Actinomycetia	Actinomycetales	
Krokinobacter	Bacteroidota	Flavobacteria	Flavobacteriales	Flavobacteriaceae
Ktedonobacter	Chloroflexota	Ktedonobacteria	Ktedonobacterales	Ktedonobacteraceae
Lacibacter	Bacteroidota	Sphingobacteria	Sphingobacteriales	Chitinophagaceae
Lamprobacter	Pseudomonadota	Gammaproteobacteria	Chromatiales	Chromatiaceae
Laribacter	Pseudomonadota	Betaproteobacteria	Neisseriales	Neisseriaceae
Leucobacter	Actinomycetota	Actinomycetia	Actinomycetales	Microbacteriaceae
Limibacter	Bacteroidota	Sphingobacteria	Sphingobacteriales	Flammeovirgaceae
Limnobacter	Pseudomonadota	Betaproteobacteria	Burkholderiales	Burkholderiaceae
Litoreibacter	Pseudomonadota	Alphaproteobacteria	Rhodobacterales	Rhodobacteraceae
Litoribacter	Bacteroidota	Sphingobacteria	Sphingobacteriales	Cytophagaceae
Luteibacter	Pseudomonadota	Gammaproteobacteria	Xanthomonadales	Xanthomonadaceae
Luteolibacter	Verrucomicrobiota	Verrucomicrobiae	Verrucomicrobiales	Verrucomicrobiaceae
Lutibacter	Bacteroidota	Flavobacteria	Flavobacteriales	Flavobacteriaceae
Lutimaribacter	Pseudomonadota	Alphaproteobacteria	Rhodobacterales	Rhodobacteraceae
Lysobacter	Pseudomonadota	Gammaproteobacteria	Xanthomonadales	Xanthomonadaceae
Mangrovibacter	Pseudomonadota	Gammaproteobacteria	Enterobacteriales	Enterobacteriaceae
Maribacter	Bacteroidota	Flavobacteria	Flavobacteriales	Flavobacteriaceae
Marinobacter	Pseudomonadota	Gammaproteobacteria	Alteromonadales	Alteromonadaceae
Maritimibacter	Pseudomonadota	Alphaproteobacteria	Rhodobacterales	Rhodobacteraceae
Meridianimaribacter	Bacteroidota	Flavobacteria	Flavobacteriales	Flavobacteriaceae
Mesoflavibacter	Bacteroidota	Flavobacteria	Flavobacteriales	Flavobacteriaceae
Mesophilobacter	Pseudomonadota	Gammaproteobacteria	Pseudomonadales	Pseudomonadaceae
Methylobacter	Pseudomonadota	Gammaproteobacteria	Methylococcales	Methylococcaceae
Microaerobacter	Bacillota	Bacilli	Bacillales	Bacillaceae
Modestobacter	Actinomycetota	Actinomycetia	Actinomycetales	Geodermatophilaceae
Modicisalibacter	Pseudomonadota	Gammaproteobacteria	Oceanospirillales	Halomonadaceae
Mucilaginibacter	Bacteroidota	Sphingobacteria	Sphingobacteriales	Sphingobacteriaceae
Naxibacter	Pseudomonadota	Betaproteobacteria	Burkholderiales	Oxalobacteraceae
Neptuniibacter	Pseudomonadota	Gammaproteobacteria	Oceanospirillales	Oceanospirillaceae
Nesiotobacter	Pseudomonadota	Alphaproteobacteria	Rhodobacterales	Rhodobacteraceae
Nitrobacter	Pseudomonadota	Alphaproteobacteria	Hyphomicrobiales	Nitrobacteraceae
Oceanobacter	Pseudomonadota	Gammaproteobacteria	Oceanospirillales	Oceanospirillaceae
Octadecabacter	Pseudomonadota	Alphaproteobacteria	Rhodobacterales	Rhodobacteraceae
Odoribacter	Bacteroidota	Bacteroidia	Bacteroidales	Porphyromonadaceae
Oleibacter	Pseudomonadota	Gammaproteobacteria	Oceanospirillales	Oceanospirillaceae
Olivibacter	Bacteroidota	Sphingobacteria	Sphingobacteriales	Sphingobacteriaceae
Ornithinibacter	Actinomycetota	Actinomycetia	Actinomycetales	Intrasporangiaceae
Oscillibacter	Bacillota	Clostridia	Clostridiales	Ruminococcaceae
Oxalobacter	Pseudomonadota	Betaproteobacteria	Burkholderiales	Oxalobacteraceae
Oxobacter	Bacillota	Clostridia	Clostridiales	Clostridiaceae
Paludibacter	Bacteroidota	Bacteroidia	Bacteroidales	Porphyromonadaceae
Pannonibacter	Pseudomonadota	Alphaproteobacteria	Rhodobacterales	Rhodobacteraceae
Papillibacter	Bacillota	Clostridia	Clostridiales	Ruminococcaceae
Parapedobacter	Bacteroidota	Sphingobacteria	Sphingobacteriales	Sphingobacteriaceae
Parasegetibacter	Bacteroidota	Sphingobacteria	Sphingobacteriales	Chitinophagaceae
Patulibacter	Actinomycetota	Actinomycetia	Solirubrobacterales	Patulibacteraceae
Paucibacter	Pseudomonadota	Betaproteobacteria	Burkholderiales	
Pedobacter	Bacteroidota	Sphingobacteria	Sphingobacteriales	Sphingobacteriaceae
Pelobacter	Thermodesulfobacteriota	Desulfuromonadia	Desulfuromonadales	Desulfuromonadaceae
Peredibacter	Bdellovibrionota	Bdellovibrionia	Bdellovibrionales	Bacteriovoracaceae
Perexilibacter	Bacteroidota	Sphingobacteria	Sphingobacteriales	Flammeovirgaceae
Persicobacter	Bacteroidota	Sphingobacteria	Sphingobacteriales	Flammeovirgaceae
Petrobacter	Pseudomonadota	Betaproteobacteria	Hydrogenophilales	Hydrogenophilaceae
Phaeobacter	Pseudomonadota	Alphaproteobacteria	Rhodobacterales	Rhodobacteraceae
Phocoenobacter	Pseudomonadota	Gammaproteobacteria	Pasteurellales	Pasteurellaceae
Pilibacter	Bacillota	Bacilli	Lactobacillales	Enterococcaceae
Pimelobacter	Actinomycetota	Actinomycetia	Actinomycetales	Nocardioidaceae
Piscinibacter	Pseudomonadota	Betaproteobacteria	Burkholderiales	
Plantibacter	Actinomycetota	Actinomycetia	Actinomycetales	Microbacteriaceae
Polaribacter	Bacteroidota	Flavobacteria	Flavobacteriales	Flavobacteriaceae
Polynucleobacter	Pseudomonadota	Betaproteobacteria	Burkholderiales	Burkholderiaceae
Pontibacter	Bacteroidota	Sphingobacteria	Sphingobacteriales	Cytophagaceae
Porphyrobacter	Pseudomonadota	Alphaproteobacteria	Sphingomonadales	Erythrobacteraceae
Prolixibacter	Bacteroidota	Bacteroidia		
Propionibacter	Pseudomonadota	Betaproteobacteria	Rhodocyclales	Rhodocyclaceae
Prosthecobacter	Verrucomicrobiota	Verrucomicrobiae	Verrucomicrobiales	Verrucomicrobiaceae
Pseudaminobacter	Pseudomonadota	Alphaproteobacteria	Hyphomicrobiales	Phyllobacteriaceae
Pseudocaedibacter	Pseudomonadota	Alphaproteobacteria	Rickettsiales	
Pseudoclavibacter	Actinomycetota	Actinomycetia	Actinomycetales	Microbacteriaceae
Pseudoramibacter	Bacillota	Clostridia	Clostridiales	Eubacteriaceae
Pseudorhodobacter	Pseudomonadota	Alphaproteobacteria	Rhodobacterales	Rhodobacteraceae
Pseudoxanthobacter	Pseudomonadota	Alphaproteobacteria	Hyphomicrobiales	Xanthobacteraceae
Psychrilyobacter	Fusobacteriota	Fusobacteriia	Fusobacteriales	Fusobacteriaceae
Psychrobacter	Pseudomonadota	Gammaproteobacteria	Pseudomonadales	Moraxellaceae
Pyramidobacter	Synergistota	Synergistia	Synergistales	Synergistaceae
Ramlibacter	Pseudomonadota	Betaproteobacteria	Burkholderiales	Comamonadaceae
Rarobacter	Actinomycetota	Actinomycetia	Actinomycetales	Rarobacteraceae
Rathayibacter	Actinomycetota	Actinomycetia	Actinomycetales	Microbacteriaceae
Rhizobacter	Pseudomonadota	Gammaproteobacteria	Pseudomonadales	Pseudomonadaceae
Rhodanobacter	Pseudomonadota	Gammaproteobacteria	Xanthomonadales	Xanthomonadaceae
Rhodobacter	Pseudomonadota	Alphaproteobacteria	Rhodobacterales	Rhodobacteraceae
Rivibacter	Pseudomonadota	Betaproteobacteria	Burkholderiales	
Roseinatronobacter	Pseudomonadota	Alphaproteobacteria	Rhodobacterales	Rhodobacteraceae
Roseobacter	Pseudomonadota	Alphaproteobacteria	Rhodobacterales	Rhodobacteraceae
Rubidibacter	Cyanobacteria		Chroococcales	
Rubrobacter	Actinomycetota	Actinomycetia	Rubrobacterales	Rubrobacteraceae
Ruminobacter	Pseudomonadota	Gammaproteobacteria	Aeromonadales	Succinivibrionaceae
Saccharibacter	Pseudomonadota	Alphaproteobacteria	Rhodospirillales	Acetobacteraceae
Saccharobacter	Pseudomonadota	Gammaproteobacteria	Enterobacteriales	Enterobacteriaceae
Salegentibacter	Bacteroidota	Flavobacteria	Flavobacteriales	Flavobacteriaceae
Salinibacter	Bacteroidota	Sphingobacteria	Sphingobacteriales	Rhodothermaceae
Sandaracinobacter	Pseudomonadota	Alphaproteobacteria	Sphingomonadales	Sphingomonadaceae
Sanguibacter	Actinomycetota	Actinomycetia	Actinomycetales	Sanguibacteraceae
Saxeibacter	Actinomycetota	Actinomycetia	Actinomycetales	Nakamurellaceae
Sedimentibacter	Bacillota	Clostridia	Clostridiales	
Sediminibacter	Bacteroidota	Flavobacteria	Flavobacteriales	Flavobacteriaceae
Segetibacter	Bacteroidota	Sphingobacteria	Sphingobacteriales	Chitinophagaceae
Selenihalanaerobacter	Bacillota	Clostridia	Halanaerobiales	Halobacteroidaceae
Serinibacter	Actinomycetota	Actinomycetia	Actinomycetales	Beutenbergiaceae
Silicibacter	Pseudomonadota	Alphaproteobacteria	Rhodobacterales	Rhodobacteraceae
Sinobacter	Pseudomonadota	Gammaproteobacteria	Xanthomonadales	Sinobacteraceae
Siphonobacter	Bacteroidota	Sphingobacteria	Sphingobacteriales	Cytophagaceae
Solirubrobacter	Actinomycetota	Actinomycetia	Solirubrobacterales	Solirubrobacteraceae
Sphaerobacter	Thermomicrobiota	Thermomicrobia	Sphaerobacterales	Sphaerobacteraceae
Spongiibacter	Pseudomonadota	Gammaproteobacteria		
Sporanaerobacter	Bacillota	Clostridia	Clostridiales	
Sporobacter	Bacillota	Clostridia	Clostridiales	Ruminococcaceae
Sporohalobacter	Bacillota	Clostridia	Halanaerobiales	Halobacteroidaceae
Stenothermobacter	Bacteroidota	Flavobacteria	Flavobacteriales	Flavobacteriaceae
Stenoxybacter	Pseudomonadota	Betaproteobacteria	Neisseriales	Neisseriaceae
Steroidobacter	Pseudomonadota	Gammaproteobacteria	Xanthomonadales	Sinobacteraceae
Stibiobacter				
Subsaxibacter	Bacteroidota	Flavobacteria	Flavobacteriales	Flavobacteriaceae
Sulfitobacter	Pseudomonadota	Alphaproteobacteria	Rhodobacterales	Rhodobacteraceae
Syntrophobacter	Thermodesulfobacteriota	Syntrophobacteria	Syntrophobacterales	Syntrophobacteraceae
Tectibacter	Pseudomonadota	Alphaproteobacteria	Rickettsiales	
Tepidanaerobacter	Bacillota	Clostridia	Thermoanaerobacterales	Thermoanaerobacteraceae
Tepidibacter	Bacillota	Clostridia	Clostridiales	Peptostreptococcaceae
Teredinibacter	Pseudomonadota	Gammaproteobacteria	Alteromonadales	
Terrabacter	Actinomycetota	Actinomycetia	Actinomycetales	Intrasporangiaceae
Tetrathiobacter	Pseudomonadota	Betaproteobacteria	Burkholderiales	Alcaligenaceae
Thalassobacter	Pseudomonadota	Alphaproteobacteria	Rhodobacterales	Rhodobacteraceae
Thermaerobacter	Bacillota	Clostridia	Clostridiales	
Thermoanaerobacter	Bacillota	Clostridia	Thermoanaerobacterales	Thermoanaerobacteraceae
Thermohalobacter	Bacillota	Clostridia	Clostridiales	Clostridiaceae
Thermolithobacter	Bacillota	Thermolithobacteria	Thermolithobacterales	Thermolithobacteraceae
Thermosediminibacter	Bacillota	Clostridia	Thermoanaerobacterales	
Thermosulfidibacter	Aquificota	Aquificae	Aquificales	
Thioalkalibacter	Pseudomonadota	Gammaproteobacteria	Chromatiales	Halothiobacillaceae
Thiobacter	Pseudomonadota	Betaproteobacteria	Burkholderiales	
Thiohalobacter	Pseudomonadota	Gammaproteobacteria		
Trichlorobacter	Thermodesulfobacteriota	Desulfuromonadia	Desulfuromonadales	Geobacteraceae
Tropicibacter	Pseudomonadota	Alphaproteobacteria	Rhodobacterales	Rhodobacteraceae
Turicibacter	Bacillota	Erysipelotrichia	Erysipelotrichales	Erysipelotrichaceae
Ulvibacter	Bacteroidota	Flavobacteria	Flavobacteriales	Flavobacteriaceae
Umboniibacter	Pseudomonadota	Gammaproteobacteria		
Verminephrobacter	Pseudomonadota	Betaproteobacteria	Burkholderiales	Comamonadaceae
Vitellibacter	Bacteroidota	Flavobacteria	Flavobacteriales	Flavobacteriaceae
Volucribacter	Pseudomonadota	Gammaproteobacteria	Pasteurellales	Pasteurellaceae
Xanthobacter	Pseudomonadota	Alphaproteobacteria	Hyphomicrobiales	Xanthobacteraceae
Xylanibacter	Bacteroidota	Bacteroidia	Bacteroidales	Prevotellaceae
Zeaxanthinibacter	Bacteroidota	Flavobacteria	Flavobacteriales	Flavobacteriaceae
Zymobacter	Pseudomonadota	Gammaproteobacteria	Oceanospirillales	Halomonadaceae

== See also ==
- -monas
- Bacteriological Code
- bacterial taxonomy has a discussion of endings of Bacterial phyla
