= Marisflavi =

Marisflavi may refer to:

- Calliostoma marisflavi, species of sea snail
- Cohaesibacter marisflavi, species of bacteria
- Kushneria marisflavi, species of bacteria
- Marinobacterium marisflavi, species of bacteria
- Oceanimonas marisflavi, species of bacteria
