= Pelotomaculum =

Scientific classification
- Domain: Bacteria
- Kingdom: Bacillati
- Phylum: Bacillota
- Class: Clostridia
- Order: Desulfotomaculales
- Family: Pelotomaculaceae
- Genus: Pelotomaculum; Imachi et al. 2002

Type species
- Pelotomaculum thermopropionicum Imachi et al. 2002

Species
- P. isophthalicicum; P. propionicicum; P. schinkii; P. terephthalicicum; P. thermopropionicum

Genus of bacteria

Pelotomaculum is a Gram-positive strictly anaerobic, mesophilic, thermophilic and non-motile bacterial genus from the family Peptococcaceae.

== Phylogeny ==
The currently accepted taxonomy is based on the List of Prokaryotic names with Standing in Nomenclature (LPSN) and National Center for Biotechnology Information (NCBI).

16S rRNA based LTP_10_2024

- Pelotomaculum
  - P. thermopropionicum Imachi et al. 2002
  - - P. propionicicum Imachi et al. 2007
    - - P. schinkii de Bok et al. 2005
      - - Cryptanaerobacter phenolicus
        - - P. isophthalicicum corrig. Qiu et al. 2006
          - P. terephthalicicum corrig. Qiu et al. 2006

120 marker proteins based GTDB 10-RS226

- - Pelotomaculum thermopropionicum (type species)
  - - - Pelotomaculum_D
        - Pelotomaculum isophthalicicum
        - Pelotomaculum terephthalicicum
    - - Pelotomaculum schinkii
      - - Pelotomaculum propionicicum
        - "Ca. Syntrophopropionicum ammoniitolerans"

== See also ==
- List of bacterial orders
- List of bacteria genera
