= Cytophaga hutchinsonii =

Scientific classification
- Domain: Bacteria
- Kingdom: Pseudomonadati
- Phylum: Bacteroidota
- Class: Cytophagia
- Order: Cytophagales
- Family: Cytophagaceae
- Genus: Cytophaga
- Species: C. hutchinsonii

Binomial name
- Cytophaga hutchinsonii Winogradsky 1929

Species of bacterium

Cytophaga hutchinsonii is a bacterial species in the genus Cytophaga. C. hutchinsonii is an aerobic, gram-negative, soil, microorganism that exhibits gliding motility, enabling it to move quickly over surfaces and is capable of cellulose degradation.

== Discovery ==
Cytophaga hutchinsonii was first classified by Russian microbiologist Sergei Winogradsky in 1929.

Winogradsky found several cellulose decomposers which were morphologically similar to Spirochaeta cytophaga, a bacterium discovered in 1919 by microbiologists Hutchinson and Clayton. S. cytophaga is an aerobic cellulose degrading bacterial species found in soil environments. Winogradsky mistakenly classified Cytophaga hutchinsonii as identical to Spirochaeta cytophaga. The 5 species were classified in the novel genus Cytophaga.

In 1933, Polish microbiologist Helena Krzemieniewska identified differences in the life cycle between Spirochaeta cytophaga and Cytophaga hutchinsonii. Spirochaeta cytophaga was renamed to Cytophaga myxococcoides.

== Gliding motility ==
Gliding motility, which is present throughout the Cytophaga-Flavobacteria group, is not well understood. Motility does not involve flagella, and is characterized as a novel mechanism in the C-F group. The C. hutchinsonii genome contains homologs to the Flavobacterium johnsoniae gliding genes (gld). It is believed that gliding ability is tied to biopolymer degradation ability for many organisms in the Cytophaga-Flavobacteria group.

== Cellulose degradation ==
Cytophaga hutchinsonii is capable of digesting crystalline cellulose to glucose in a contact dependent manner. The cellulose degrading enzymes have been identified and have no known homologs.

Cellulose is a linear highly ordered polysaccharide that forms long crystalline fibrils which are difficult to degrade, particularly within small bacterial cells due to their small size. Most aerobic bacteria degrade cellulose with exoglucanases, endoglucanases, and β-glucosidases. Many contain cellulosomes, multienzyme structures that degrade cellulose on bacterial cell surfaces. C. hutchinsonii does not code for cellulosomes. Degradation most likely occurs in the bacterial periplasm.

=== Cellulose-degrading enzymes ===
Cytophaga hutchinsonii encodes 9 speculated processive endo-β-1,4-glucanases belonging to GH5 and GH9, which are known glycoside hydrolase families. Eight of the genes coding for endoglucanases are cel5A, cel5B, cel5C, cel9A, cel9B, cel9C, cel9E, and cel9F. Cel5B and Cel9C are periplasmic endoglucanases, while Cel5A, Cel9A, Cel9B, Cel9D, and Cel9E are predicted to be secreted endoglucanases, which use a type IX secretion system to produce oligomers from amorphous cellulose (RAC).

They also contain β-glucosidases (bgl), enzymes that hydrolyze the final step, turning cellobiose (a disaccharide) into glucose. β-glucosidases belong to GH3, another glycoside hydrolase family. C. hutchinsonii contains four β-glucosidases located in cellular periplasm, called BglA, BglB, BglC, and BglD. BglB is the main β-glucosidase gene transcribed when cells are grown in glucose or cellobiose cultures. BglA is only transcribed when cells are grown in cellobiose culture (produced from cellulose degradation). BglA and BglB are essential β-glucosidases, and in mutant cells not expressing both proteins, cells are unable to degrade cellobiose. Unlike other β-glucosidases, BglA’s hydrolytic activity does not decrease with longer substrate chains like cyclodextrins (cellotriose and cellotetraose). This is likely due to larger active site with less substrate specificity, and BglA is able to cleave glucose units one by one in a non-processive manner, dissociating from substrate after each glucose is cleaved. BglA’s ability to cleave longer cellulose fragments likely plays a role in allowing C. hutchinsonii to degrade cellulose without cellobiohydrolases.

BglB on the other hand does not hydrolyze cellodextrins effectively. The processive endoglucanases, which can catalyze several enzymes before releasing the cellulose substrate, could play a role in allowing C. hutchinsonii to degrade without encoding separate cellobiohydrolases. Additionally, adding degrading cellodextrins in the periplasm could increase efficiency by reducing loss of cellobiose to competing microorganisms.

=== Applications ===
The cyclodextrin degrading B-glucosidases are of interest economically due to their lack of inhibition by glucose.
