= Sulfide:quinone reductase =

Identifiers
- EC no.: 1.8.5.4

Databases
- BRENDA: enzyme data
- ExPASy: NiceZyme view
- KEGG: enzyme entry
- MetaCyc: metabolic pathway
- Rhea: reactions
- PDB structures: RCSB PDB PDBe PDBsum
Search
- PMC: articles
- PubMed: articles
- NCBI: proteins

Sulfide:quinone reductase (SQR, EC 1.8.5.4) is an enzyme with systematic name sulfide:quinone oxidoreductase. This enzyme catalyses the following chemical reaction

n HS^{−} + n quinone $\rightleftharpoons$ polysulfide + n quinol

SQR contains FAD. Ubiquinone, plastoquinone, rhodoquinone or menaquinone can act as acceptor in different species.

The Enzyme Commission (EC) number for SQR is 1.8.5.’. The number indicates that the protein is an oxidoreductase (indicated by 1). The oxidoreductase reacts with a sulfur molecule (sulfide in this case) to donate electrons (indicated by 8). The donated electrons are accepted by a quinone (indicated by 5). Multiple sulfide:quinone oxidoreductases are found in bacteria, archaea, and eukaryotes, but the function highlighted in the EC numbers 1.8.5.’. which are all constant except the final digit which is 4 in bacteria and 8 in eukaryotic mitochondria.

== Crystalline structure ==
The SQR in Aquifex aeolicus is composed of three subunits with a negatively charged hydrophilic side exposed to the periplasmic space and a hydrophobic region that integrates into the cell’s plasma membrane. The protein's active site is composed of an FAD cofactor covalently linked by a thioether bond to the enzyme. On the si side of the FAD the sulfide reacts and donates its electrons to FAD, while the re side of FAD is connected to a disulfide bridge and donates electrons to the quinone. 2, 3 The quinone is surrounded by Phe-385 and Ile-346. Both amino acids are located in the hydrophobic region of the plasma membrane and are conserved among all sulfide: quinone oxidoreductases.

== Reaction Pathway ==
In A. aeolicus, SQR is an integral monotopic protein, so it penetrates into the hydrophobic region of the plasma membrane. The SQR reaction takes place in two half reactions, sulfide oxidation and quinone reduction. The active site of SQR is composed of a region that interacts with the periplasmic space and sulfide connected by a FAD cofactor and a trisulfide bridge to a quinone. FAD receives two electrons from sulfide and transfers the electrons one at time to the quinone. The amino acids surrounding the quinone are all hydrophobic. Also, there is a highly conserved region of uncharged amino acids, phenylalanine and isoleucine, that surround the benzene ring of the quinone.

SQR is a member of the flavoprotein disulfide reductase (FDR) superfamily. FDRs are typically characterized as being dimeric or two subunit proteins, but sulfide quinone oxidoreductase is a trimeric protein. The main purpose of SQR is to detoxify sulfide. Sulfide is a toxic chemical that inhibits enzymatic reactions, especially those with metal cofactors. Most notably, sulfide inhibits cytochrome oxidase found in the electron transport chain. SQR oxidizes sulfide and produces non-toxic products.

== Role in metabolism ==
SQR is an integral protein that enters cells' plasma membrane (or inner mitochondrial membrane). The plasma membrane is the site of the electron transport chain for respiration. The electron transport chain depends on two factors: 1) ability of a membrane to store an ion gradient; 2) the ability of an organism to pump hydrogen ions against a gradient (from low to high concentration). SQR enhances the formation of an ion gradient by donating two electrons to the quinone. Once the electrons are in the quinone, they are transported to the quinone pool. The quinone pool is located inside the hydrophobic region of the plasma membrane and plays a role in transporting hydrogen ions to the periplasm. From the quinone pool, electrons travel to cytochrome c oxidase where oxygen is waiting as the final electron acceptor.

Electrons from carbon sources react in a similar fashion to those in sulfide. Two main differences separate the carbon pathway and the sulfur pathway: 1) sulfur (sulfide in this case) skips glycolysis and the tricarboxylic acid cycle (TCA), while the carbon pathway requires both cycles to store electrons in NADHl 2) electrons from sulfide are donated to SQR, while the electrons from NADH are donated to the NADH:quinone oxidoreductase. In both cases, the electrons are shuttled to the quinone pool, then to cytochrome c oxidase where the final electron acceptor is waiting. SQR is such a conserved protein because SQR enhances energy conservation and synthesizes ATP when carbon sources are depleted, but the main incentive to conserve SQR is to detoxify sulfide.

A 2021 study found that increased SQR levels were protective against hypoxia in squirrels and mice. In Caenorhabditis elegans, a rhodoquinone-based SQR provides a protective role against hydrogen sulfide accumulation. C. elegans has two SQR genes, sqrd-1 and sqrd-2, a gene duplication trend seen in other animals that face hypoxia and sulfide like Mytilus californianus.
