= Desulfotomaculum =

Scientific classification
- Domain: Bacteria
- Kingdom: Bacillati
- Phylum: Bacillota
- Class: Clostridia
- Order: Desulfotomaculales
- Family: Desulfotomaculaceae
- Genus: Desulfotomaculum; Campbell & Postgate 1965

Type species
- Desulfotomaculum nigrificans (Werkman & Weaver 1927) Campbell & Postgate 1965

Species
- See text

Synonyms
- Desulforamulus Watanabe, Fukui & Kuever 2021

Genus of bacteria

Desulfotomaculum is a genus of Gram-positive, obligately anaerobic soil bacteria. A type of sulfate-reducing bacteria, Desulfotomaculum can cause food spoilage in poorly processed canned foods. Their presence can be identified by the release of hydrogen sulfide gas with its rotten egg smell when the can is first opened. They are endospore-forming bacteria.

In 2005, a new strain of Desulfotomaculum, called Desulforudis audaxviator, was discovered during drilling 2.8 km deep in the Mponeng gold mine in South Africa. The strain, found in water which has been isolated for tens of millions of years, exists completely independent of photosynthesis. The bacteria use radiolytically produced hydrogen gas, which is generated in that environment by the energy released by radioisotopes. The bacteria also use sulfates. Sulfates may be generated both by the energy released by radioisotopes as well as by other chemical reactions. Generated hydrogen sulfide may be a continuous energy source for this organism. Some organisms can obtain energy from sources other than from the sun or other stars, which means similar lifeforms may be found on other planets in the Solar System and elsewhere.

Desulfotomaculum present as straight or curved rods. They are highly heat resistant and free-living fixers of atmospheric nitrogen. They are motile with peritrichous flagella and are common inhabitants of soil, water, geothermal run-off, insect intestines and in rumen. They also cause "sulphide stinker" spoilage of canned foods.

== Phylogeny ==
The currently accepted taxonomy is based on the List of Prokaryotic names with Standing in Nomenclature (LPSN) and National Center for Biotechnology Information (NCBI).

16S rRNA based LTP_10_2024

- Desulfotomaculum
  - D. nigrificans (Werkman & Weaver 1927) Campbell & Postgate 1965
  - - D. putei Liu et al. 1997
    - - - D. hydrothermale Haouari et al. 2008
        - D. varum Ogg & Patel 2011
      - - D. profundi Berlendis et al. 2016
        - - D. ferrireducens Yang et al. 2016
          - - D. aeronauticum Hagenhauer, Hippe & Rainey 1997
            - - D. ruminis Campbell & Postgate 1965
              - - D. aquiferis Berlendis et al. 2016
                - - D. defluvii Krishnamurthi et al. 2013
                  - D. reducens Visser et al. 2016

120 marker proteins based GTDB 10-RS226

- Desulfotomaculum
  - - D. nigrificans
    - - D. aquiferis
      - D. ruminis
  - - - D. aeronauticum
      - D. ferrireducens
    - - D. reducens
      - - D. profundi
        - - D. hydrothermale
          - D. putei

Unassigned species:

- D. carboxydivorans Parshina et al. 2005
- "D. copahuensis" Willis Poratti et al. 2016
- D. arcticum synonym of Desulfotruncus arcticus (Vandieken, Knoblauch & Jorgensen 2006) Watanabe, Fukui & Kuever 2021
- D. geothermicum synonym of Desulfoscipio geothermicus (Daumas, Cord-Ruwisch & Garcia 1990) Watanabe, Fukui & Kuever 2021
- D. halophilum synonym of Desulfohalotomaculum halophilum (Tardy-Jacquenod et al. 1998) Watanabe, Kojima & Fukui 2018
- D. thermoacetoxidans synonym of Desulfofundulus thermoacetoxidans (Min & Zinder 1995) Watanabe, Kojima & Fukui 2018

== See also ==
- List of bacterial orders
- List of bacteria genera
