= Desulfotomaculum arcticum =

Scientific classification
- Domain: Bacteria
- Kingdom: Bacillati
- Phylum: Bacillota
- Class: Clostridia
- Order: Desulfotomaculales
- Family: Desulfotomaculaceae
- Genus: Desulfotomaculum
- Species: D. arcticum

Binomial name
- Desulfotomaculum arcticum Vandieken et al. 2006

Species of bacterium

Desulfotomaculum arcticum is a spore-forming, moderately thermophilic, sulfate-reducing bacterium. Its type strain is 15^{T} (=DSM 17038^{T} =JCM 12923^{T}).
