= Tropicibacter phthalicicus =

Scientific classification
- Domain: Bacteria
- Kingdom: Pseudomonadati
- Phylum: Pseudomonadota
- Class: Alphaproteobacteria
- Order: Rhodobacterales
- Family: Rhodobacteraceae
- Genus: Tropicibacter
- Species: T. phthalicicus

Binomial name
- Tropicibacter phthalicicus Iwaki et al. 2012

Type strain
- CECT 8649, JCM 17793, KCTC 23703, KU27E

Species of bacterium

Tropicibacter phthalicicus is a Gram-negative, phthalate-degrading and aerobic bacterium from the genus of Tropicibacter which has been isolated from seawater from the Ishigaki Island in Japan.
