= Cohaesibacter haloalkalitolerans =

Scientific classification
- Domain: Bacteria
- Kingdom: Pseudomonadati
- Phylum: Pseudomonadota
- Class: Alphaproteobacteria
- Order: Hyphomicrobiales
- Family: Cohaesibacteraceae
- Genus: Cohaesibacter
- Species: C. haloalkalitolerans

Binomial name
- Cohaesibacter haloalkalitolerans Sultanpuram et al. 2013

Type strain
- JC131, KCTC 32038, NBRC 109022

Species of bacterium

Cohaesibacter haloalkalitolerans is a bacterium from the genus Cohaesibacter.
