= Cohaesibacter gelatinilyticus =

Scientific classification
- Domain: Bacteria
- Kingdom: Pseudomonadati
- Phylum: Pseudomonadota
- Class: Alphaproteobacteria
- Order: Hyphomicrobiales
- Family: Cohaesibacteraceae
- Genus: Cohaesibacter
- Species: C. gelatinilyticus

Binomial name
- Cohaesibacter gelatinilyticus Hwang and Cho 2008

Type strain
- CL-GR15, DSM 18289, KCCM 42319

Species of bacterium

Cohaesibacter gelatinilyticus is a gram-negative bacteria from the genus Cohaesibacter which was isolated from surface of coastal seawater from the east coast of Korea.
