= Mangrovibacter =

Scientific classification
- Domain: Bacteria
- Kingdom: Pseudomonadati
- Phylum: Pseudomonadota
- Class: Gammaproteobacteria
- Order: Enterobacterales
- Family: Enterobacteriaceae
- Genus: Mangrovibacter; Rameshkumar et al. 2010

Type species
- M. plantisponsor

Genus of bacteria

Mangrovibacter is a genus in the order Enterobacterales. Members of the genus are Gram-stain-negative, facultatively anaerobic, nitrogen-fixing, and rod shaped. The name Mangrovibacter derives from:
Neo-Latin noun mangrovum, mangrove; Neo-Latin masculine gender noun, a rod; bacter, nominally meaning "a rod", but in effect meaning a bacterium, rod; Neo-Latin masculine gender noun Mangrovibacter, mangrove rod.

== Species ==
The genus contains three species, M. yixingensis, M. phragmitis, and M. plantisponsor

=== M. plantisponsor ===
M. plantisponsor was the first of the three to be discovered (Rameshkumar et al. 2010, (Type species of the genus).; Latin feminine gender noun planta, plant; Latin masculine gender noun sponsor, sponsor, guarantor; Neo-Latin masculine gender noun plantisponsor, sponsor of plants, referring to the potentially plant-beneficial properties of the type strain.)

=== M. yixingensis ===
M. yixingensis was the second species discovered after being isolated from farmland soil in Yixing, China in 2015. The species was identified via its 16S rRNA sequences, for which the samples were most related to those of M. plantisponsor, placing it in the Mangrovibacter genus. M. yixingensis notably have peritrichous flagella, with them coming from all over the cell body.

=== M. phragmitis ===
M. phragmitis was the third and most recent species discovered and was isolated from the roots of tall reed (Phragmites karka) in Odisha, India. The 16S rRNA sequences for the species were most related to M. plantisponsor and M. yixingensis. M. phragmitis is slightly halophilic and grows optimally at 1% NaCl.

== See also ==
- Bacterial taxonomy
- Microbiology
