= Desulfotomaculum geothermicum =

Scientific classification
- Domain: Bacteria
- Kingdom: Bacillati
- Phylum: Bacillota
- Class: Clostridia
- Order: Desulfotomaculales
- Family: Desulfotomaculaceae
- Genus: Desulfotomaculum
- Species: D. geothermicum

Binomial name
- Desulfotomaculum geothermicum Daumas et al. 1990

Heat-loving, sulfate-reducing bacteria

Desulfotomaculum geothermicum is a thermophilic, fatty acid-degrading, sulfate-reducing bacterium. It is capable of growing at temperatures of up to 80 °C (176 °F) and is commonly found in geothermal environments, such as hot springs and deep-sea hydrothermal vents. The species was first isolated from a hot spring in Beppu, Japan, in 1992 and was later characterized in detail.

Desulfotomaculum geothermicum is of interest to scientists because of its ability to degrade organic matter and produce methane, a potent greenhouse gas. The bacteria play an important role in the global carbon cycle and are thought to contribute to the carbon balance in hot springs and other geothermal environments. Additionally, the enzymes produced by Desulfotomaculum geothermicum are of interest for biotechnological applications, such as the production of biofuels and the removal of sulfates from industrial wastewater.
