= Subsaxibacter broadyi =

Scientific classification
- Domain: Bacteria
- Kingdom: Pseudomonadati
- Phylum: Bacteroidota
- Class: Flavobacteriia
- Order: Flavobacteriales
- Family: Flavobacteriaceae
- Genus: Subsaxibacter
- Species: S. broadyi

Binomial name
- Subsaxibacter broadyi Bowman and Nichols 2005

Bacterium

Subsaxibacter broadyi is a Gram-negative, strictly aerobic and chemoheterotrophic bacterium from the genus of Subsaxibacter.
