= Acidoferrum =

Scientific classification (Candidatus)
- Domain: Bacteria
- Kingdom: Pseudomonadati
- Phylum: Acidobacteriota
- Class: "Acidobacteriia"
- Order: "Candidatus Acidoferrales"; Epihov et al. 2021
- Genus: "Candidatus Acidoferrum"; Epihov et al. 2021

Type species
- "Ca. Acidoferrum panamensis" Epihov et al. 2021

Species
- "Ca. A. panamensis" Epihov et al. 2021; "Ca. A. typicum" Epihov et al. 2021

Genus of bacteria

"Candidatus Acidoferrum" is a candidate genus of Acidobacteriota.
