= Antarctobacter heliothermus =

Scientific classification
- Domain: Bacteria
- Kingdom: Pseudomonadati
- Phylum: Pseudomonadota
- Class: Alphaproteobacteria
- Order: Rhodobacterales
- Family: Rhodobacteraceae
- Genus: Antarctobacter
- Species: A. heliothermus

Binomial name
- Antarctobacter heliothermus Labrenz et al. 1998

Species of bacterium

Antarctobacter heliothermus is a Gram-negative, aerobic, pointed and budding bacteria, the type species of its genus. Its type strain is EL-219T(= DSM 11445T).
