= Cryptanaerobacter =

Scientific classification
- Domain: Bacteria
- Kingdom: Bacillati
- Phylum: Bacillota
- Class: Clostridia
- Order: Desulfotomaculales
- Family: Pelotomaculaceae
- Genus: Cryptanaerobacter; Juteau et al. 2005

Type species
- Cryptanaerobacter phenolicus Juteau et al. 2005

Species
- C. phenolicus

Genus of bacteria

Cryptanaerobacter is a genus in the phylum Bacillota (Bacteria).

== Etymology ==
The name Cryptanaerobacter derives from: Greek cryptos (κρυπτός), hidden; an (ἄν), not; aer, aeros (ἀήρ, ἀέρος), air; Neo-Latin, a rod bacter, nominally meaning "a rod", but in effect meaning a bacterium, rod; giving Cryptanaerobacter, an anaerobic rod that is hidden within the consortium.

== Species ==
The genus contains a single species, Cryptanaerobacter phenolicus (Juteau et al. 2005, (type species of the genus). The specific name is from Latin phenol, phenol; icus, suffix used in adjectives with the sense of belonging to; giving phenolicus, belonging to phenol.)

== See also ==
- List of bacterial orders
- List of bacteria genera
