= Enhydrobacter aerosaccus =

Scientific classification
- Domain: Bacteria
- Kingdom: Pseudomonadati
- Phylum: Pseudomonadota
- Class: Gammaproteobacteria
- Order: Pseudomonadales
- Family: Moraxellaceae
- Genus: Enhydrobacter
- Species: E. aerosaccus

Binomial name
- Enhydrobacter aerosaccus Staley et al. 1987

Type strain
- ATCC 27094, DSM 8914, LMG 12227, LMG 21753, LMG 21877, NCIMB 12535

Species of bacterium

Enhydrobacter aerosaccus is a gram negative, catalase- and oxidase-positive, non motile bacterium which contains gas vacuoles from the genus of Enhydrobacter which was isolated from the Wintergreen Lake in Michigan.
