= Ulvibacter marinus =

Scientific classification
- Domain: Bacteria
- Kingdom: Pseudomonadati
- Phylum: Bacteroidota
- Class: Flavobacteriia
- Order: Flavobacteriales
- Family: Flavobacteriaceae
- Genus: Ulvibacter
- Species: U. marinus

Binomial name
- Ulvibacter marinus Baek et al. 2014

Type strain
- IMCC12008

Bacterium

Ulvibacter marinus is a Gram-negative, aerobic, chemoheterotrophic and non-motile bacterium from the genus of Ulvibacter which has been isolated from seawater from the coast of the Yellow Sea. The species produces flexirubin-type pigment. U. marinus is catalase and oxidase positive.
