= Adhaeribacter =

Scientific classification
- Domain: Bacteria
- Kingdom: Pseudomonadati
- Phylum: Bacteroidota
- Class: Cytophagia
- Order: Cytophagales
- Family: Hymenobacteraceae
- Genus: Adhaeribacter; Rickard et al. 2005

Type species
- A. aquaticus

Species
- A. aerolatus A. aerophilus A. aquaticus A. terreus

Genus of bacteria

Adhaeribacter is a genus in the phylum Bacteroidota (Bacteria).

== Etymology ==
The name Adhaeribacter derives from:
Latin v. adhaereo -ere, to adhere to, stick to; Neo-Latin masculine gender noun, a rodbacter, nominally meaning "a rod", but in effect meaning a bacterium, rod; Neo-Latin masculine gender noun Adhaeribacter, sticky rod.

== Species ==
The genus contains 4 species (including basonyms and synonyms), namely

- A. aerolatus ( Weon et al. 2010; Greek noun aer, aeros (ἀήρ, ἀέρος) air; Latin participle masculine gender adjective latus, carried; Neo-Latin masculine gender participle adjective aerolatus, airborne.)
- A. aerophilus ( Weon et al.. 2010; Greek noun aer, aeros (ἀήρ, ἀέρος)', air; Greek masculine gender adjective φίλος, loving; Neo-Latin masculine gender adjective aerophilus, air-loving.)
- A. aquaticus ( Rickard et al. 2005, (Type species of the genus).; Latin masculine gender adjective aquaticus, living, growing, or found in or by water, aquatic.)
- A. terreus ( Zhang et al. 2009; Latin masculine gender adjective terreus, of earth.)

== See also ==
- Bacterial taxonomy
- Microbiology
