= Desulfotomaculum thermoacetoxidans =

Scientific classification
- Domain: Bacteria
- Kingdom: Bacillati
- Phylum: Bacillota
- Class: Clostridia
- Order: Desulfotomaculales
- Family: Desulfotomaculaceae
- Genus: Desulfotomaculum
- Species: D. thermoacetoxidans

Binomial name
- Desulfotomaculum thermoacetoxidans Min and Zinder 1995

Species of bacterium

Desulfotomaculum thermoacetoxidans is an obligately anaerobic, thermophilic, spore-forming sulfate-reducing bacterium with type strain CAMZ.
