= Subsaxibacter arcticus =

Scientific classification
- Domain: Bacteria
- Kingdom: Pseudomonadati
- Phylum: Bacteroidota
- Class: Flavobacteriia
- Order: Flavobacteriales
- Family: Flavobacteriaceae
- Genus: Subsaxibacter
- Species: S. arcticus

Binomial name
- Subsaxibacter arcticus Xu et al. 2016

Type strain
- SM1214

Bacterium

Subsaxibacter arcticus is a Gram-negative, aerobic and rod-shaped bacterium from the genus of Subsaxibacter which has been isolated from intertidal sand from Kongsfjorden in Svalbard.
