= Zeaxanthinibacter enoshimensis =

Scientific classification
- Domain: Bacteria
- Kingdom: Pseudomonadati
- Phylum: Bacteroidota
- Class: Flavobacteriia
- Order: Flavobacteriales
- Family: Flavobacteriaceae
- Genus: Zeaxanthinibacter
- Species: Z. enoshimensis

Binomial name
- Zeaxanthinibacter enoshimensis Asker et al. 2007

Type strain
- TD-ZE3

Bacterium

Zeaxanthinibacter enoshimensis is a Gram-negative strictly aerobic and rod-shaped bacterium from the genus of Zeaxanthinibacter which has been isolated from seawater from Enoshima. Zeaxanthinibacter enoshimensis produces zeaxanthin. Zeaxanthinibacter enoshimensis requires sodium chloride for growth, with an optimum salinity of 4% (w/v). The species produces β-galactosidase.
