= Ulvibacter antarcticus =

Scientific classification
- Domain: Bacteria
- Kingdom: Pseudomonadati
- Phylum: Bacteroidota
- Class: Flavobacteriia
- Order: Flavobacteriales
- Family: Flavobacteriaceae
- Genus: Ulvibacter
- Species: U. antarcticus

Binomial name
- Ulvibacter antarcticus Choi et al. 2007

Type strain
- IMCC3101

Bacterium

Ulvibacter antarcticus is a Gram-negative, obligately aerobic and chemoheterotrophic bacterium from the genus of Ulvibacter which has been isolated from Antarctic seawater from the coast. The species is catalase and oxidase positive.
