= Zeaxanthinibacter aestuarii =

Scientific classification
- Domain: Bacteria
- Kingdom: Pseudomonadati
- Phylum: Bacteroidota
- Class: Flavobacteriia
- Order: Flavobacteriales
- Family: Flavobacteriaceae
- Genus: Zeaxanthinibacter
- Species: Z. aestuarii

Binomial name
- Zeaxanthinibacter aestuarii Lee et al. 2016

Type strain
- S2-22

Bacterium

Zeaxanthinibacter aestuarii is a Gram-negative and strictly aerobic bacterium from the genus of Zeaxanthinibacter which has been isolated from estuary sediments from Korea. Colonies are yellow on marine agar. The species grows at warmer temperatures, with an optimum growth temperature between 35-37 °C.
