= Vertical transmission =

Transmission of a symbiont from parent to offspring

Vertical transmission of symbionts is the transfer of a microbial symbiont from the parent directly to the offspring. Many metazoan species carry symbiotic bacteria which play a mutualistic, commensal, or parasitic role. A symbiont is acquired by a host via horizontal, vertical, or mixed transmission.

== Fitness benefits ==
Vertical transmission, passage of symbiotic microflora from parents to offspring, is common in species of animals which have parental care. There are fitness benefits in providing youths with established microorganism community early on.

1. Immune system development: parents microbes prime young immune system.
2. Disease resistance: because skin is already colonized by parental microbes, pathogen flora has a harder time to establish itself.
3. Digestive help: parental microbes might help with digestion, as a result, the young ones can survive on a diet which would not meet their nutritious needs otherwise.
4. Environmental adaptation: microflora might help to cope with environmental stress.
5. Increased social cohesion: the microbiome may produce neurological or chemical signals that alter social behavior.

== Evolutionary consequences ==
Complex interdependence occurs between host and symbiont. The genetic pool of the symbiont is generally smaller and more subject to genetic drift. In true vertical transmission, the evolutionary outcomes of the host and symbiont are linked. If there is mixed transmission, new genetic material may be introduced. Generally, symbionts settle into specific niches and can even transfer part of their genome into the host nucleus.

=== Benefits ===
The mechanism promotes tightly coupled evolutionary pressure, which causes the host and symbiont to function as a holobiont.

=== Disadvantages ===
Evolutionary bottlenecks lead to less symbiont diversity, and thus resilience. Similarly, this greatly reduces the effective population size. Ultimately, without an influx of new genetic material, the population becomes clonal. Mutations tend to persist in symbionts and build up over time.

== Transmission modes ==
=== Matrilineal ===
==== Germline ====
Since the egg contributes the organelles and has more space and opportunity for intracellular symbionts to be passed to subsequent generations, it is a very common method of vertical transmission. Intracellular symbionts can migrate from the bacteriocyte to the ovaries and become incorporated in germ cells.

In plants, vertical transmission of microbial endophytes through germline can occur matrilineally via seed. There are several mechanisms by which a seed can matrilineally become infected with endophytes. The mother plant can produce vascular connections from its somatic microbiomes to the endosperm. Alternatively, endophytes can be transmitted directly when reproductive organs are developing in the shoot apical meristem.

==== Live birth ====
Human infants acquire their microbiome from their mothers, from every sphere where there is contact. This includes potentially the mother's vagina, gastrointestinal tract, skin, mouth and breastmilk. These routes are typical if the delivery is a vaginal birth and the infant is nursed. When other actions, such as Caesarian delivery, bottle feeding, or maternal antibiotics during nursing occur, these modes of vertical transmission are disrupted.

Human infants are generally protected from most viruses, bacteria and other pathogens while in the uterus as the placenta forms a barrier. However, some viruses (e.g. Zika) and bacteria (e.g. listeria) can still pass through the placenta to the fetus through vertical transmission, which is why some foods are recommended to be avoided during pregnancy.

=== Patrilineal ===
Though extremely rare, Rickettsia is transmitted to Nephotettix cincticep through the paternal line in the sperm.

In plants, vertical transmission of microbial endophytes through germline can occur patrilineally via pollen. Patrilineal transmission has been hypothesized to be a common mechanism for fungal endophyte transmission, as well as bacteria.

=== Parental care ===
Microbes can be transmitted through the actions of parents caring for their offspring, such as the cultivation of gut microbes through regurgitation feeding. This type of vertical transmission does not always occur via the behavior of the genetic parent; instead, other members of a social or family groups may transmit the microbial community, resulting in kin selection.

=== Aposymbiotic ===
Earthworms (Eisenia) have an extracellular symbiont, Verminephrobacter. Rather than being passed through the egg in the germline, the young are aposymbiotic when still in the egg capsule; however, they acquire Verminephrobacter before the egg capsule ruptures, so it is still vertical transmission.

== Examples ==
=== Invertebrates ===
Vertical transmission of endosymbiotic bacteria is very common in insects.

==== Wolbachia ====
It's estimated that about 70% of all insects carry the bacteria Wolbachia, which can be transmitted vertically as well as horizontally. Depending on the host species, it may function as mutualist or a pathogen. In order to maintain the infection within a host species, it must enter the forming egg cell and be transmitted through the germline. To improve the rate of vertical transmission, Wolbachia can alter its host's reproductive system in a diverse array of mechanisms, such as induced parthenogenesis, male killing, or feminization. All of these increase the ratio of infected females, which is beneficial to a matrilineally-spread infection.

==== Pea aphids and Buchnera ====
Pea Aphids do not get all of the necessary amino acids from their diet. Their obligate symbiont, Buchnera, synthesize the remainder.

==== Head lice and Candidatus Riesia pediculicola ====
The head louse (Pediculus humanus) has an obligate symbiotic relationship with Candidatus Riesia pediculicola. The louse provides shelter and protection while bacteria provides essential B vitamins. C. riesia lives in the bacteriocyte but move to the ovaries to be transmitted to the next generation.

==== Tsetse flies and Wigglesworthia glossinidia ====
Tsetse flies have a fascinating life cycle. Tsetse gives life birth, which is extremely rare among insects. The fly fertilized one egg at the time and for the first three larval stages the single offspring developed inside the mother's uterus feeding on milk substance coming from milk glands in the uterus. Through the "milk" the youngsters receive parent microflora including Wigglesworthia glossinidia, the bacteria providing host with vitamins B scarce in the tsetse fly's blood-only diet.

==== Social spiders ====
Social spiders Stegodyphus dumicola live in Namibia and Botswana. The majority of females in the colony are virgins but participate in offspring care for reproducing females. Offspring hatch symbiont-free, and bacterial symbionts are transmitted vertically across generations by social interactions with the onset of regurgitation feeding by (foster) mothers early in the development.

=== Vertebrates ===
==== Caecililans ====
Caecilians feed youngsters by mother skin, passing to them the microflora which colonize youngster's skin and gut. The mother's skin is adapted for this purpose, thickening beforehand and regenerating quickly after being consumed to continue providing for her young. She repeats the process several times during early development without significant harm to herself. The repeated nature of skin feeding means that juveniles are exposed to their mother microbiome several times, enhancing the likelihood of microbial gut and skin successful colonization.

==== Bornean foam‑nesting frogs ====
Bornean foam‑nesting frogs Leptomantis harrissoni tadpoles receive microbes from both their parents (vertically) and environment (horizontally). Initially they have microbiomes resembling their parents and the exterior of the foam nest, but after one week in the pond tadpoles pick up new microbes from the pond environment.

==== Imitator dart frog ====
A Ranitomeya imitator dart frog feeds tadpoles with unfertilized trophic eggs. Anaerobic parabasalian protists are passed to the tadpoles via vertical transmission. In the gut, these protists express digestive enzymes Proteinases. By doing so, they help youngsters to have the ability to digest fat and protein in the mother egg versus plant debris in the mini pond they live in. Genes that code for Proteinases are not present in the Ranitomeya genome. The symbiosis allows Ranitpomeya imitator to expand into the new ecological niche and tadpoles to grow more robustly. Another mechanism of vertical transmission via parental care occurs when the father carries a tadpole on its back from the egg to the breeding pool, which allows the tadpole an opportunity to receive microflora patrilinealy.
