= Bryobacteraceae =

Scientific classification
- Domain: Bacteria
- Kingdom: Pseudomonadati
- Phylum: Acidobacteriota
- Class: "Acidobacteriia"
- Order: Bryobacterales; Dedysh and Yilmaz 2018
- Family: Bryobacteraceae; Dedysh et al. 2017

Type genus
- Bryobacter Kulichevskaya et al. 2010

Genera
- Bryobacter; Paludibaculum; "Ca. Solibacter"; "Ca. Sulfuripaludibacter"

Family of bacteria

The Bryobacteraceae are a family of Acidobacteriota.

== Phylogeny ==
The currently accepted taxonomy is based on the List of Prokaryotic names with Standing in Nomenclature and National Center for Biotechnology Information (NCBI).

16S rRNA based LTP_08_2023

- Bryobacteraceae
  - Bryobacter
  - Paludibaculum

120 marker proteins based GTDB 10-RS226

- Bryobacteraceae
  - - Bryobacter Kulichevskaya et al. 2010
    - Paludibaculum Kulichevskaya et al. 2014
  - - "Ca. Solibacter" Ward et al. 2009
    - "Ca. Sulfuripaludibacter" corrig. Hausmann et al. 2018
