= Congregibacter litoralis =

Scientific classification
- Domain: Bacteria
- Kingdom: Pseudomonadati
- Phylum: Pseudomonadota
- Class: Gammaproteobacteria
- Order: Cellvibrionales
- Family: Halieaceae
- Genus: Congregibacter
- Species: C. litoralis

Binomial name
- Congregibacter litoralis Spring et al. 2009

Type strain
- DSM 17192; KT71; NBRC 104960

Species of bacterium

Congregibacter litoralis is a gram-negative Gammaproteobacteria part of the NOR5/OM60 Clade discovered in seawater from Heligoland, an island in the North Sea by H. Eilers from the Max Planck Institute for Microbiology. C. litoralis strain KT71 is described as a pleomorphic bacterium and has a size of 2 x 0.5 μm. When grown in culture, C. litoralis KT71 has a generation time of 4.5 hours and prefers to grow on complex substrates where the sole carbon source is undefined, though it can utilize some sole carbon sources because they are most likely used by the organism for its central metabolism.

== Classification ==
=== Phylogeny ===
Congregibacter litoralis KT71 was one of the first cultured members of OM60/NOR5 clade and is part of the aerobic anoxygenic phototrophs (AAnPs), a group of bacteria that include marine and freshwater Gamma- and Alphaproteobacteria. Within the environment, members of the OM60/NOR5 clade are cosmopolitan in ocean environments, but seem to have a greater abundance in euphotic coastal marine areas. In April 2015, C. litoralis KT71 was classified into the newly proposed Order of Cellvibrionales and Family Halieaceae. Within the OM60/NOR5 clade, Congregibacter litoralis KT71 clusters, based on the 16S rRNA gene with the genera Congregibacter, Haliea, Halioglobus, Luminiphilus, and Pseudohaliea.

== Discovery and isolation ==
KT71 was first isolated from a surface water sample taken near Helgoland, an island in the North Sea by Eilers et al. in August 1999. To isolate the organism, Eliers et al. used direct plating on complex low-nutrient media called MPM developed by Schut et al. MPM was designed to mimic seawater. However, Eilers et al. modified this to adjust the pH to 7.5 and reduced NH_{4}Cl and KH_{2}PO_{4} to 50 and 1.5 μM, respectively. Briefly, seawater was plated onto MPM and modified MPM and allowed to grow for 37 days. During the 37 days, colonies were picked and placed into liquid MPM culture.

== Basic genomic information ==
In 2004, C. litoralis KT71 was picked for whole genome sequencing. To sequence the organism, plasmid and fosmid libraries were prepared with insert sizes of 4 and 40 kb. The clonal sequences were sequenced by an Applied Biosystems 3730XL DNA sequencer at the J. Craig Venter Science Foundation Joint Technology Center. From this, it was determined that C. litoralis KT71 had a genome size of 4.35Mbp with a GC content of 57.7%. Moreover, the genome contains 3933 coding genes. KT71's assembled genome was assessed for protein coding regions using the Prokaryotic Genomes Automatic Annotation Pipeline (PGAAP) from the National Center for Biotechnology Information. Once completed, genome annotation of the open reading frames was done with GenDB v2.2 annotation system.

== Metabolism ==
Congregibacter litoralis KT71 is an aerobic anoxygenic photoheterotroph (AAnPs). In general terms, this means that KT71 is a strict aerobic organism with preference for low-oxygen environments. To find these environments, KT71 uses a flagellum combined with chemotaxis to move towards low-oxygen areas. Though it does contain a complete photosynthesis superoperon, KT71 cannot grow autotrophically. Instead, KT71 uses light for light-dependent cyclic electron transport through its photosystem to generate a proton gradient. To determine the metabolism of KT71, the organism was grown in mineral medium containing: 35.0 g of sea salts, 0.1 g of NH_{4}Cl, 0.05 g of K_{2}HPO_{4}, and 10 ml of a vitamin solution. The mineral medium was then supplemented with various carbon compounds to determine the ability for KT71 to use in its metabolism. From this it was determined that KT71 can grow well with carbon sources such as glutamate, pyruvate, and fatty acids as well as more complex substrates like yeast extract and trypticase peptone. Within its genome, genes, determined from genome annotation, involved in the pentose phosphate pathway, trichloroacetic acid cycle (TCA), citric acid cycle were found which correlated to the metabolism observed in culture. Further, KT71 is unable to use glucose as a sole carbon source, which was supported by genome analysis that showed a lack of glucose metabolism genes. Although the supplementation of inorganic sulfur to media did not promote growth, KT71 does contain sulfur-oxidizing (sox) genes that are uniquely arranged in its genome. It is predicted that the potential use of the sox genes would be in the adenosine 5'-phosphosulfate (APS)/ 3'-Phosphoadenosine-5'-phosphosulfate (PAPS) pathway.

== Importance and role ==
=== Importance ===
Though KT71 and other AAnPs can make up over 10% of the bacterioplanktonic community in oligotrophic oceans, more recent studies have shown them to be less important in open ocean and more important (over 15%) in eutrophic and mesotrophic coastal ocean regions. Further, though AAnPs have been characterized previously in Alphaproteobacteria, KT71 was the first Gammaproteobacteria AAnP to be isolated and suggest a potential for a second group of AAnPs. KT71 will therefore serve as the model organism for this group to help shed light on the importance of Gammaproteobacteria AAnPs in the coastal environment.

=== Role ===
When grown in pure culture, it was observed under a microscope that KT71 formed aggregates. These formations were supported by genome analysis in which genes coding for Type IV pili as well as extracellular polysaccharide production were found. It was predicted by Fuchs et al. that KT71 uses the polysaccharide formation to help form marine snow. KT71 uses these particles that are high in nutrients as a source of nutrients or live in a commensal relationship with other bacteria that provide the necessary compounds that KT71 uses for substrates.
