= Ulvibacter alkanivorans =

"Candidatus Ulvibacter alkanivorans"

Scientific classification (Candidatus)
- Domain: Bacteria
- Kingdom: Pseudomonadati
- Phylum: Bacteroidota
- Class: Flavobacteriia
- Order: Flavobacteriales
- Family: Flavobacteriaceae
- Genus: Ulvibacter
- Species: "Ca. U. alkanivorans"

Binomial name
- "Candidatus Ulvibacter alkanivorans" Campeao et al. 2019

Bacterium

"Candidatus Ulvibacter alkanivorans" is a candidatus bacterium from the genus Ulvibacter.
