= Tropicibacter naphthalenivorans =

Scientific classification
- Domain: Bacteria
- Kingdom: Pseudomonadati
- Phylum: Pseudomonadota
- Class: Alphaproteobacteria
- Order: Rhodobacterales
- Family: Rhodobacteraceae
- Genus: Tropicibacter
- Species: T. naphthalenivorans

Binomial name
- Tropicibacter naphthalenivorans Harwati et al. 2009

Type strain
- CECT 7648, DSM 19561, JCM 14838, strain C02

Species of bacterium

Tropicibacter naphthalenivorans is a gram-negative, aerobic and motile bacterium from the genus of Tropicibacter which has been isolated from seawater from the Semarang Port in Indonesia.
