= Pelotomaculum thermopropionicum =

Scientific classification
- Domain: Bacteria
- Kingdom: Bacillati
- Phylum: Bacillota
- Class: Clostridia
- Order: Desulfotomaculales
- Family: Pelotomaculaceae
- Genus: Pelotomaculum
- Species: P. thermopropionicum

Binomial name
- Pelotomaculum thermopropionicum Imachi et al. 2002

Species of bacterium

Pelotomaculum thermopropionicum is an anaerobic, thermophilic, syntrophic propionate-oxidizing bacterium, the type species of its genus. The type strain is strain SI(T) (= DSM 13744T = JCM 10971T).
