= Desulfotomaculum halophilum =

Scientific classification
- Domain: Bacteria
- Kingdom: Bacillati
- Phylum: Bacillota
- Class: Clostridia
- Order: Desulfotomaculales
- Family: Desulfotomaculaceae
- Genus: Desulfotomaculum
- Species: D. halophilum

Binomial name
- Desulfotomaculum halophilum Tardy-Jacquenod et al. 1998

Species of bacterium

Desulfotomaculum halophilum is a halophilic sulfate-reducing bacterium. It is endospore-forming, long, straight to curved rod-shaped and with type strain SEBR 3139^{T} (= DSM 11559^{T}).
