= Peptococcus =

Scientific classification
- Domain: Bacteria
- Kingdom: Bacillati
- Phylum: Bacillota
- Class: Clostridia
- Order: Eubacteriales
- Family: Peptococcaceae
- Genus: Peptococcus; Kluyver and van Niel 1936

Type species
- Peptococcus niger (Hall 1930) Kluyver & van Niel 1936

Species
- P. niger; P. simiae

Genus of bacteria

Peptococcus is a Gram-positive bacterium genus in the family Peptococcaceae.

Species in the genus are part of the human microbiome, especially in the bacteria that form the gut flora. They are part of the flora of the mouth, upper respiratory tract and large intestine.

Mezlocillin is an antibiotic that is effective against Peptococcus species.

Peptococcus niger is the only species left in the genus. All others have been moved to Peptostreptococcus.
