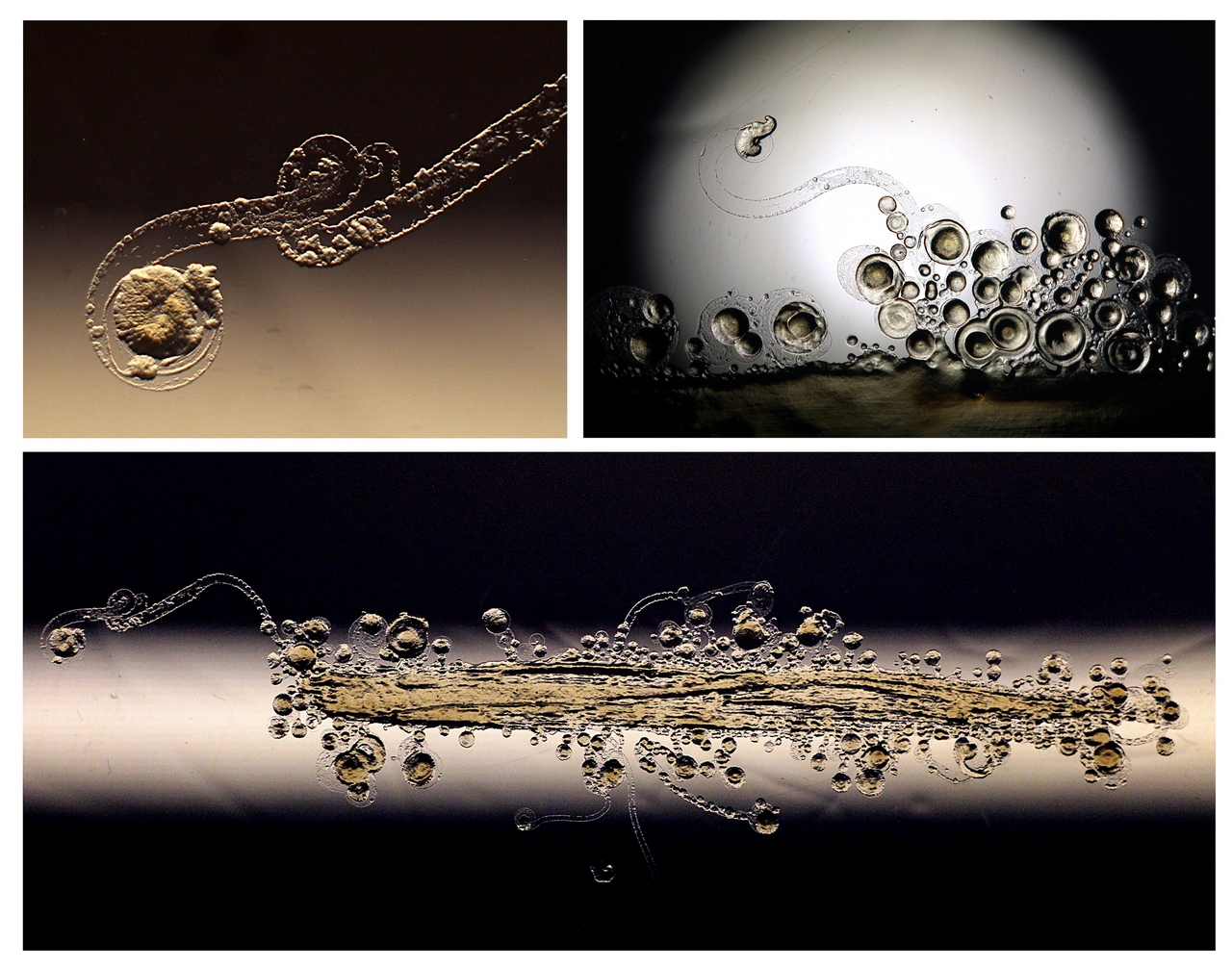
- Cytophaga image

Scientific classification
- Domain: Bacteria
- Kingdom: Pseudomonadati
- Phylum: Bacteroidota
- Class: Cytophagia
- Order: Cytophagales
- Family: Cytophagaceae
- Genus: Cytophaga; Winogradsky 1929 (Approved Lists 1980)

Species
- Cytophaga aurantiaca; Cytophaga hutchinsonii

= Cytophaga =

Genus of bacteria

Cytophaga is a genus of Gram-negative, gliding, rod-shaped bacteria. This bacterium is commonly found in soil, and rapidly digests crystalline cellulose. C. hutchinsonii is able to use its gliding motility to move quickly over surfaces. Although the mechanism for this is not known, there is a belief that the flagellum is not used.

== Species ==
The following are some species in Cytophaga:

- Cytophaga hutchinsonii — aerobic cellulolytic soil bacterium that is known for its ability to rapidly glide over surfaces. The mechanism of cellulose digestion is not fully known; however, it is known that C. hutchinsonii has multiple cell-associated cellulolytic enzymes.

=== Species previously classified in Cytophaga: ===
- Flavobacterium psychrophila (previously: "Cytophaga psychrophila)" — causes peduncle or cold water disease in Brook trout; predisposed by subnormal water temperature.
- Flavobacterium columnare (previously: Cytophaga columnaris) — the cause of columnaris disease in salmonid fish, as associated with increased water temperature; it is characterized by white necrotic plaques overlaying skin ulcers; formerly called: Flexibacter columnaris.
- Flavobacterium johnsoniae (previously: Cytophaga johnsonae) — associated with false columnaris disease.
- Breznibacter xylanoticus (previously: Cytophaga xylanolytica) — a gliding bacterium that dominates xylan degradation in freshwater environments
