= Ulvibacter litoralis =

Scientific classification
- Domain: Bacteria
- Kingdom: Pseudomonadati
- Phylum: Bacteroidota
- Class: Flavobacteriia
- Order: Flavobacteriales
- Family: Flavobacteriaceae
- Genus: Ulvibacter
- Species: U. litoralis

Binomial name
- Ulvibacter litoralis Nedashkovskaya et al. 2004

Bacterium

Ulvibacter litoralis is a Gram-negative, aerobic, heterotrophic and non-motile bacterium from the genus of Ulvibacter which has been isolated from the green alga Ulva fenestrata. The species produces yellow-orange colored colonies on marine agar. The species is able to grow at temperatures between 4-36 °C, with optimum growth occurring between 21-23 °C.
