= Petrobacter =

Scientific classification
- Domain: Bacteria
- Kingdom: Pseudomonadati
- Phylum: Pseudomonadota
- Class: Hydrogenophilia
- Order: Hydrogenophilales
- Family: Hydrogenophilaceae
- Genus: Petrobacter; Bonilla Salinas et al. 2004
- Species: P. succinatimandens

Binomial name
- Petrobacter succinatimandens Bonilla Salinas et al. 2004

Genus of bacteria

Petrobacter is a genus of gram-negative, non-spore-forming bacteria from the family Hydrogenophilaceae. So far there is only one species known, Petrobacter succinatimandens. It was identified in an Australian oil well.
