= Subsaxibacter sediminis =

Scientific classification
- Domain: Bacteria
- Kingdom: Pseudomonadati
- Phylum: Bacteroidota
- Class: Flavobacteriia
- Order: Flavobacteriales
- Family: Flavobacteriaceae
- Genus: Subsaxibacter
- Species: S. sediminis

Binomial name
- Subsaxibacter sediminis Sharma et al. 2018

Type strain
- ARC111

Bacterium

Subsaxibacter sediminis is a Gram-negative and rod-shaped bacterium from the genus of Subsaxibacter which has been isolated from sediments from the Midtre Lovénbreen glacier.
