= Actibacter =

Scientific classification
- Domain: Bacteria
- Kingdom: Pseudomonadati
- Phylum: Bacteroidota
- Class: Flavobacteriia
- Order: Flavobacteriales
- Family: Flavobacteriaceae
- Genus: Actibacter; Kim et al. 2008

Type species
- A. sediminis

Genus of bacteria

Actibacter is a genus in the phylum Bacteroidota (Bacteria). The genus contains a single species, namely A. sediminis.

== A. sediminis ==
A. sediminis, like other members of the phylum Bacteroidota, is Gram-negative and its major respiratory quinone is MK-6. Additionally, it grows aerobically and forms yellow-pigmented colonies which, however, do not contain Flexirubin-type pigments. This non-motile rod-shaped bacterium was isolated from tidal flat sediment of Dongmak on Ganghwa Island, South Korea.

== Etymology ==
The name Actibacter derives from:
Latin noun acta, seaside; Neo-Latin masculine gender noun, a rodbacter, nominally meaning "a rod", but in effect meaning a bacterium, rod; Neo-Latin masculine gender noun Actibacter, rod from the seaside.

While the epithet sediminis is from Latin genitive case noun sediminis, of a sediment.

== See also ==
- Bacterial taxonomy
- Microbiology
