= Cohaesibacter marisflavi =

Scientific classification
- Domain: Bacteria
- Kingdom: Pseudomonadati
- Phylum: Pseudomonadota
- Class: Alphaproteobacteria
- Order: Hyphomicrobiales
- Family: Cohaesibacteraceae
- Genus: Cohaesibacter
- Species: C. marisflavi

Binomial name
- Cohaesibacter marisflavi Qu et al. 2011

Type strain
- CGMCC 1.9157, DQHS21, NCCB 100300

Species of bacterium

Cohaesibacter marisflavi is a gram-negative, catalase-negative, oxidase-positive rod-shaped bacteria from the genus Cohaesibacter.
