= Sediminibacter =

Scientific classification
- Domain: Bacteria
- Kingdom: Pseudomonadati
- Phylum: Bacteroidota
- Class: Flavobacteriia
- Order: Flavobacteriales
- Family: Flavobacteriaceae
- Genus: Sediminibacter; Khan et al. 2007

Species
- S. furfurosus

Synonyms
- Achroomonas

Bacterium

Sediminibacter is a Gram-negative, chemoheterotrophic and non-motile genus of bacteria from the family of Flavobacteriaceae with on known species (Sediminibacter furfurosus).
