= Enhydrobacter =

Scientific classification
- Domain: Bacteria
- Kingdom: Pseudomonadati
- Phylum: Pseudomonadota
- Class: Gammaproteobacteria
- Order: Pseudomonadales
- Family: Moraxellaceae
- Genus: Enhydrobacter; Staley et al. 1987

Type species
- Enhydrobacter aerosaccus

Species
- Enhydrobacter aerosaccus

Genus of bacteria

Enhydrobacter is a genus of bacteria which belongs to the class Alphaproteobacteria. So far, only one species is known (Enhydrobacter aerosaccus). Enhydrobacter has been discussed to be reclassified to the family Rhodospirillaceae and the class Alphaproteobacteria. Because of its oxidase positive it can not be placed in the family Enterobacteriaceae as it is not a parasite of birds or mammals.
