= Congregibacter =

Scientific classification
- Domain: Bacteria
- Kingdom: Pseudomonadati
- Phylum: Pseudomonadota
- Class: Gammaproteobacteria
- Order: Cellvibrionales
- Family: Halieaceae
- Genus: Congregibacter; Spring et al. 2009

Species
- Congregibacter brevis Tak et al. 2025; Congregibacter litoralis Spring et al. 2009; Congregibacter variabilis Tak et al. 2025

Genus of bacteria

Congregibacter is a genus of bacteria in the family Halieaceae.
