= Verminephrobacter =

Scientific classification
- Domain: Bacteria
- Kingdom: Pseudomonadati
- Phylum: Pseudomonadota
- Class: Betaproteobacteria
- Order: Burkholderiales
- Family: Comamonadaceae
- Genus: Verminephrobacter; Pinel et al. 2012

Species
- V. aporrectodeae V. eiseniae

Genus of bacteria

Verminephrobacter is a genus of Gram-negative bacteria that colonize the nephridia of earthworms within the family Lumbricidae. The first species in the genus, V. eiseniae, was isolated from the earthworm Eisenia foetida, and its description published in 2008. Their closest free-living relatives are bacteria of the genus Acidovorax.

Reports of bacteria inhabiting the nephridia of earthworms first appeared in 1926. Their approximate identity was determined in 2003. While the function of the bacteria inside the nephridia remains unknown, several lines of evidence suggest this association as a stable symbiosis. Chiefly among them is the vertical transmission of the bacteria, meaning that the bacteria are deposited by the parent earthworm inside the egg-capsule, and colonize the developing embryo via specialized anatomical features. Colonization of the nephridia cannot occur after the eggs hatch. DNA belonging to members of the genus has not been recovered from surveys of soil samples even in the presence of high densities of earthworms, suggesting that Verminephrobacter species are confined to their earthworm hosts. Observations for comparative analyses of the genome sequence of V. eiseniae suggest that this organisms shares features associated with the transition from a free-living to a host-associated lifestyle.
