= Meridianimaribacter =

Scientific classification
- Domain: Bacteria
- Kingdom: Pseudomonadati
- Phylum: Bacteroidota
- Class: Flavobacteriia
- Order: Flavobacteriales
- Family: Flavobacteriaceae
- Genus: Meridianimaribacter; Wang et al. 2010

Type species
- Meridianimaribacter flavus

Species
- M. flavus

Genus of bacteria

Meridianimaribacter is a Gram-negative and rod-shaped genus of bacteria from the family of Flavobacteriaceae with one known species (Meridianimaribacter flavus). M. flavus was isolated from marine sediment in the South China Sea.
