= Mponeng Gold Mine =

Mine in Gauteng province near Johannesburg, South Africa

Mponeng
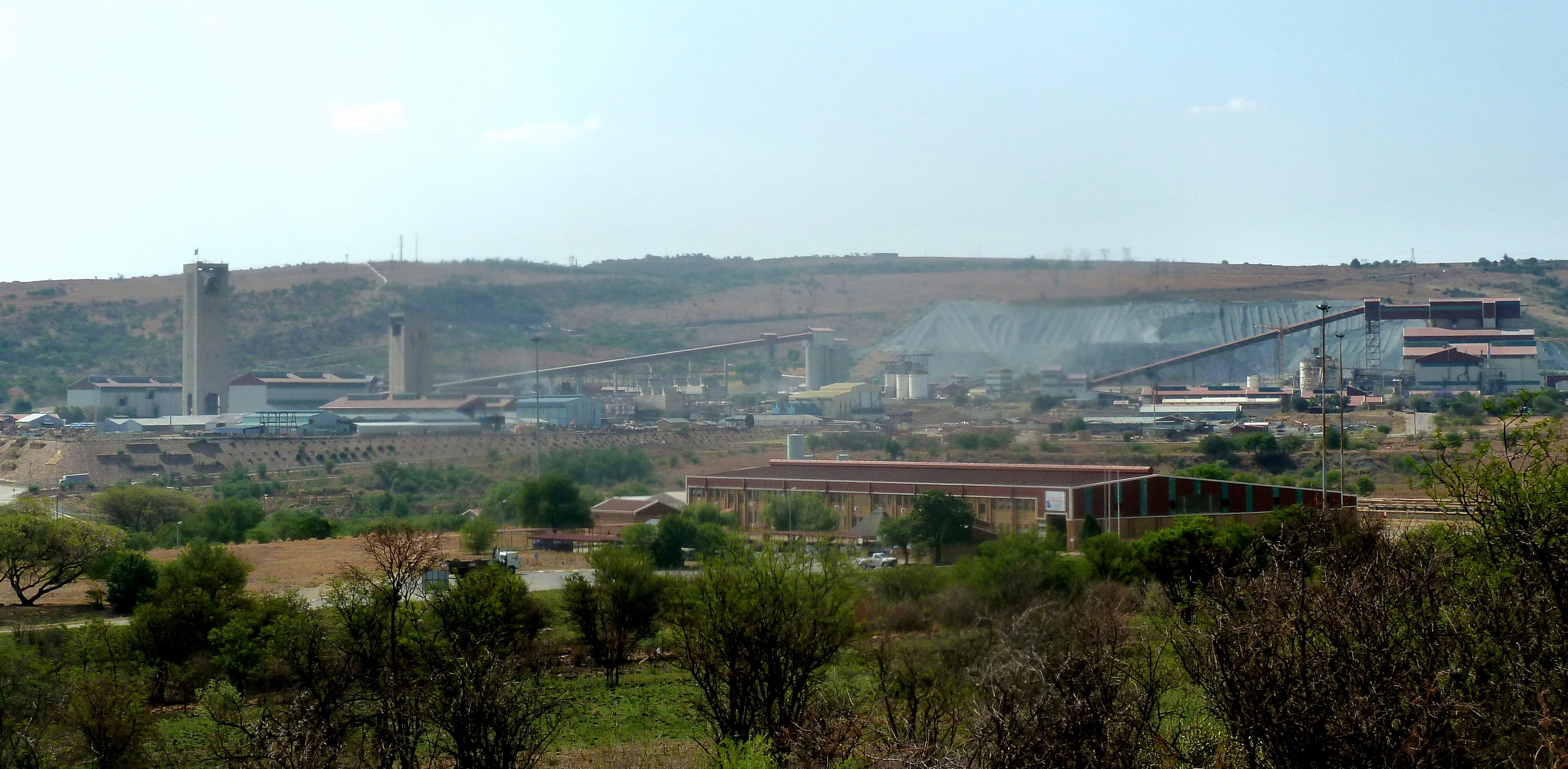
- Above-ground operations at Mponeng mine.

- Location in South Africa
- Location: Gauteng, South Africa; 26°26′10″S 27°25′50″E
- Company: Harmony Gold
- Website: https://www.harmony.co.za

Mponeng is an ultra-deep tabular gold mine in South Africa in the Witwatersrand Basin of the Gauteng Province. Previously known as Western Deep Levels No1 Shaft, the mine began operations in 1986. It is one of the most substantial gold mines in the world in terms of both production and magnitude, reaching over 4 kilometres (2.5 mi) below the surface. Mponeng is the world's deepest mine from ground level, and there are aims to deepen the mine beyond 4km to reach more reserves. A trip from the surface to its deepest point takes over an hour. An Ecuadorian marathon runner completed a half marathon within the mine in 2017. The mine supports a very large number of people, companies and industries, including entire towns and cities.

== Operations ==
=== History ===
As part of the Witwatersrand, the largest gold mineralization on earth, Mponeng is the result of the discovery of the basin by Europeans. Beginning in the 1850–70s a series of mineral discoveries were made in the area, including those of Pieter Jacobus Marais panning gold from a river and Henry Lewis finding a quartz and gold vein on a farm, that led to the Witwatersrand Gold Rush in 1886. These discoveries led to many mining operations and after shaft sinking for about 5 years (1981) Mponeng officially began mining operations in 1986. Before Mponeng, the mine was known as the Western Deep Levels South Shaft or the No1 Shaft; the name Mponeng came into use in 1999.

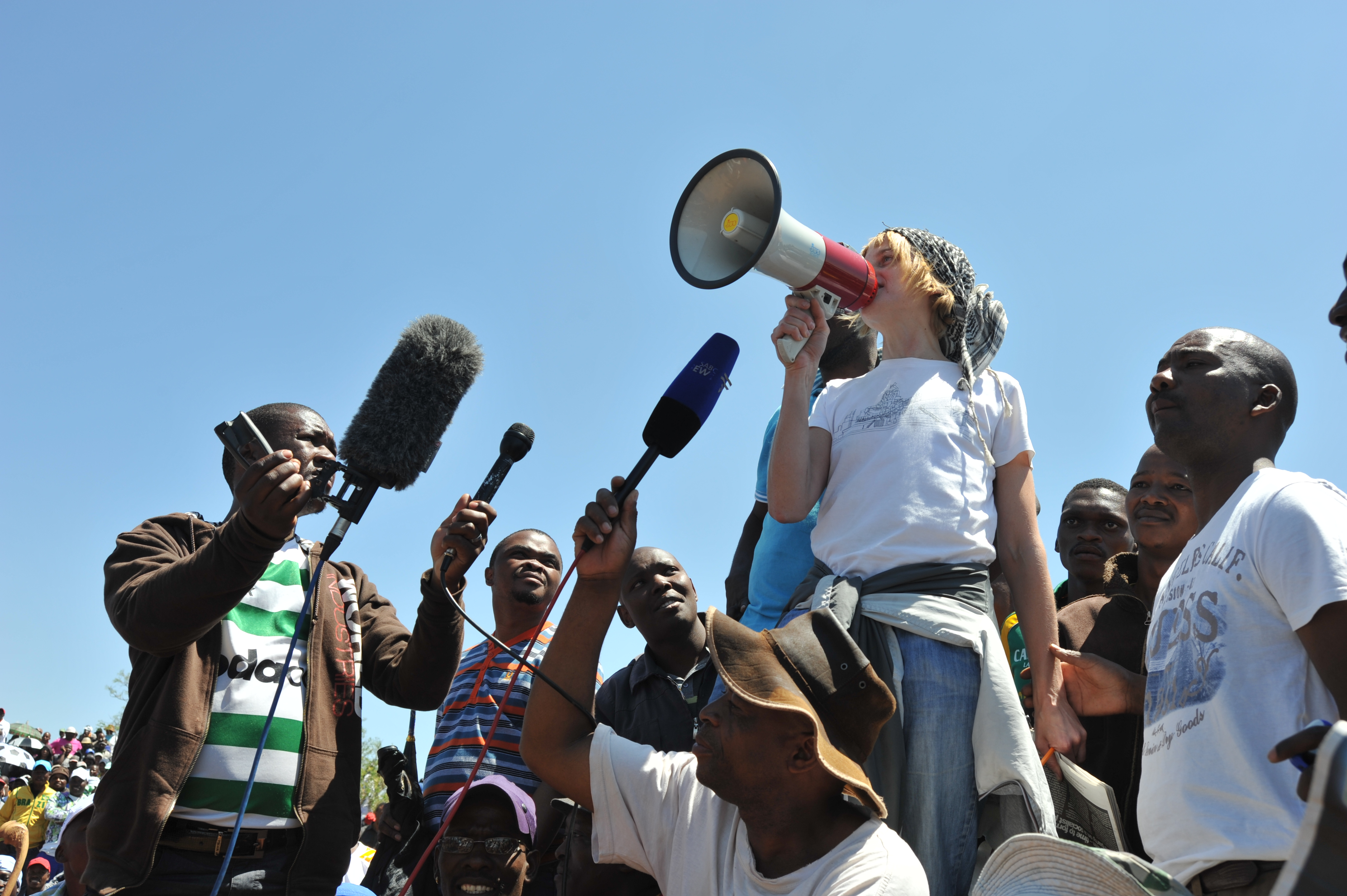
Liv Shange addresses striking mineworkers in Carletonville during 2012 national strikes.

The mine has been running since 1986 and has the possibility to run for 43 years, so it is estimated to be producing until 2029, when reserves may finally run out. Current depths reach roughly 3.8 km down, in the coming years of remaining production life of the mine it will likely reach beyond 4.2 km depth. The mine has not been running continuously since the day of opening in 1986. A seismic event in March 2020 killed three miners, causing a stoppage of operations. Like many other operations, Mponeng closed due to the COVID-19 pandemic in May 2020, but has since returned to production.

Striking in South Africa's mining district was apparent in the 1900s, for example the South African gold mine strike in August 1946. As Mponeng did not start operations until near the turn of the century there has not been many other notable strikes since then, other than 2012. In 2012, while AngloGold Ashanti was Mponeng's owner, strikes occurred. The strikes were a combined result of gold and platinum industry-worker issues in South Africa. AngloGold's position on the matter was to maintain safety, peace, and stability. The striking action of 2012 totaled nearly 16% of the total mining workforce of South Africa, not just Mponeng. AngloGold specifically experienced nearly 35,000 workers putting down their tools in the unprotected strike. Although not at Mponeng, the strike of 2012 included a wildcat strike at a nearby platinum mine ended with 34 miners dying from police interactions.

=== Operations and ownership ===
Harmony Gold, Africa's largest gold producer, purchased Mponeng from AngloGold Ashanti (AGA) in 2020, for approximately $200 million. Harmony Gold also acquired Mine Waste Solutions as they gathered the remainder of AGA's assets in late 2020. As of 2022, all-in costs of production were US$1771/oz (US$1614/Troy oz); at then-current prices of roughly US$2080/oz (US$1900/Troy oz)., the mine was barely breaking even, although profitability situation improved with the 2024-2026 gold price surge, during which the gold price exceeded $5,000/Troy oz before settling around $4,000/Troy oz. Over 5,400 metric tons of rock are excavated from Mponeng each day.

The most recent publication from Harmony Gold outlines their 2023-year production:

- Produced: 7,449 kg (239,490 oz) of gold, worth $468 million at the average 2023 price
- Grade: 8.43g/t
- Volume of ore milled: 884,000 tons

== Physical conditions ==
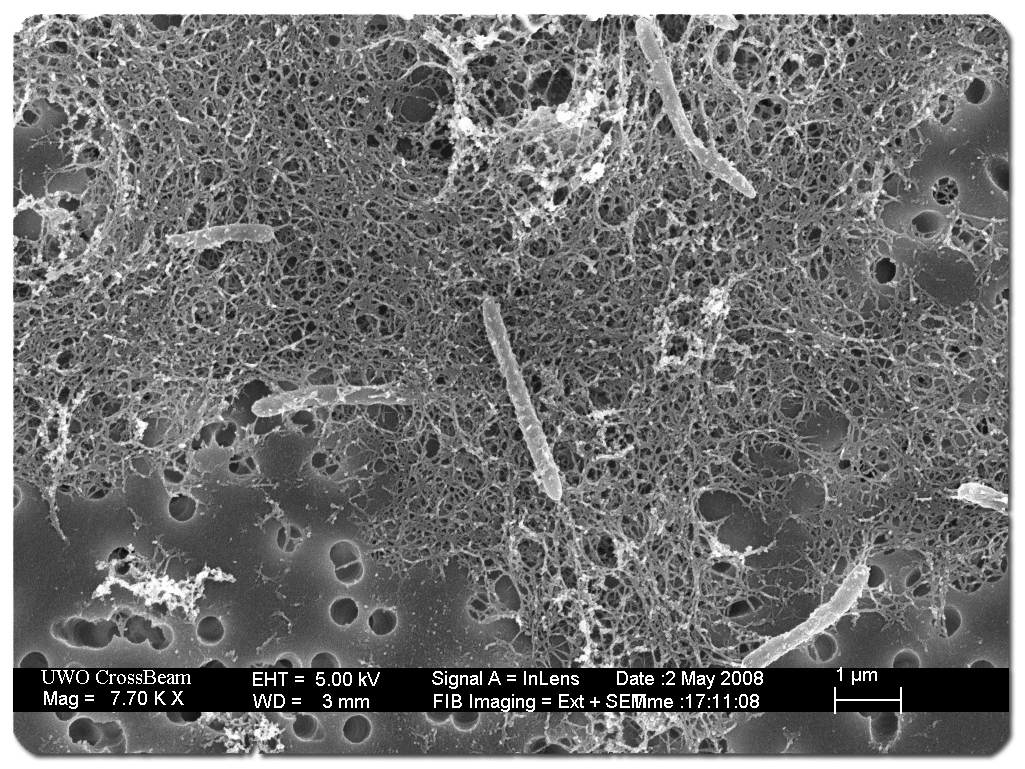
A colony of Desulforudis audaxviator, discovered in the Mponeng gold mine

The temperature of the rock reaches 66 °C (151 °F), and the mine pumps slurry ice underground to cool the tunnel air to below 30 °C (86 °F). A mixture of concrete, water, and rock is packed into excavated areas, which further acts as an insulator. Tunnel walls are secured by flexible shotcrete reinforced with steel fibers, which is further held in place by diamond-mesh netting.

In 2008, researchers looking for extremophile organisms discovered the bacterium Desulforudis audaxviator present within groundwater samples from kilometers deep in the mine. The name 'Audaxviator' comes from a Latin-language passage in the novel Journey to the Centre of the Earth by Jules Verne: "Descende, audax viator, et terrestre centrum attinges." ("Descend, bold traveller, and attain the centre of the Earth.")

== Geology and gold bearing fractures ==
The mine sits in the Witwatersrand Basin and uses 2 horizons: Ventersdorp Contact Reef and Carbon Leader Reef. In the Mponeng mine the Ventersdorp Contact Reef is mainly interbedded quartzite and coarse conglomerates and constitutes only a meter or two of thickness. The Witwatersrand Basin has experienced many surges of thrusting in the past, resulting in abundant fractures. These small faults often correspond to depositional and sediment contacts. It is along these faults that mineralizing fluids flow, which lead to the precipitation or mineralisation of gold. This complicated geologic history associates with gold mineralization to a high degree, the Witwatersrand Basin holds nearly a third of gold reserves and is responsible for over 40% of all gold. Mponeng has a proven gold reserve of roughly 46 million ounces (over 1300 tons), more than 8x the second deepest gold mine 'Driefontein', also located in South Africa.

The gold mineralization is likely related to hydrothermal activity, and occurs in varying lithology of conglomerates, known as the reefs stated above. The stratigraphy that the gold is found in ranges in thickness, from around 10 cm to a 1-meter. Gold is found in these variable thickness layers of pebble lags, stacked fluvial deposits, and other stratigraphy. Mponeng specifically, gold is associated with previously mentioned thrust fracturing and with the following mineralisations:

- Steep quartz/sulphide-bearing fractures
- Sub-horizontal quartz fractures
- Sulphide-bearing fractures
- Ultracataclastics
- Mesophased hydrocarbons

As with most mines, Mponeng is limited to the structural control of the geology. The VCR mineralisation is governed by thrust-fracture systems discussed above, largely from the Lower Klipriviersberg age. The VCR and CLR themselves are around 2.7 billion years old, and have experienced lots of deformation and change.

== Environmental impacts ==
South Africa has been dealing with the effects of mining-related pollution for years; the effects of mining-related environmental damage have been large given that mining is roughly 8% of the South African GDP. In 1998, mining industry contributed nearly 90% of the 533.6 million tons of waste that was produced annually. According to 1998 data, gold mining is the largest single source of pollution in South Africa. A large portion of this occurs in the Witwatersrand Basin, home to over 270 tailings storage facilities, covering 18,000 Ha.

Mining creates two main kinds of waste: waste rock piles and tailing storage facilities (TSFs). Waste rock piles are the rock that must be removed in order to reach the ore; for Mponeng, the waste rock piles are considerable due to the mine's great depth. Tailings result from the crushing and grinding process of the ore, very fine silt sized material is produced and collected in mounds. Tailings especially come with severe environmental and health issues as they contain potentially hazardous chemicals. Long-term consequences are also of concern, whether the mine activities continue, halt, or a mine is abandoned, these TSFs can pose serious risk to the surrounding environment. Pollution has been found to persist even after 72 years of mine abandonment.

The mine also emitted 933,205 tons of CO_{2} equivalent in 2024. Gold mining operations contribute to greenhouse gas emissions primarily through the use of heavy machinery, ore processing, and energy-intensive refining methods. Diesel-powered equipment, explosives, and electricity consumption—largely derived from fossil fuels in South Africa—lead to significant carbon dioxide (CO_{2}) and methane (CH_{4}) emissions.

Beyond the environment, the citizens of the Witwatersrand Basin have been complaining of windblown dust, most of which originates from partially rehabilitated TSFs. Anglo Ashanti began recording meteorological data in 2012 and Harmony Gold has since taken over monitoring after the acquisition in 2020. Citizens are concerned surrounding heavy metal content as well as silica content, as both pose serious health risks (silicosis, tuberculosis, bronchitis, chronic obstructive pulmonary disease (COPD), lung cancer). A study in 2020 found elevated value of silica and uranium in PM10 airborne pollution from TSFs of gold mines in the area.

In South Africa, heavy metal pollution from mining industry is the leading cause of soil and water pollution. The pollution stems from a few sources:

- Acid mine drainage (AMD)
- Salinization
- Elevated levels of potentially toxic elements (PTE)
  - Mainly heavy metals, also including arsenic (metalloid).
- Airborne dust

=== Environmental remediation ===
Two actions can begin to combat South Africa's pollution issues relating to gold mining, prevention of new pollution and remediation of old. The caveats of prevention and remediation are the fact that both of which are extremely difficult and expensive, neither the mining industry or South Africa could afford a completely turn around on pollution.

Immobilizing the PTEs in the TSFs is a main focus of pollution prevention and control.

- Liming the acidic tailings to a suitable pH (>5.5) can significantly reduce the mobility of cationic PTEs. This requires large amount of lime.
- Application of clays or organic matter with high cation capacity, with goal of PTE absorption.
- Application of sesquioxides (M_{2}O_{3}) which would immobilize oxy-anionic PTEs.
- Application of hydroxides or phosphates, similar effect of liming.

Other than prevention and remediation, it has been proposed that to protect environments remaining tailings materials should be removed from TSFs if containment is not secure.

== Seismicity ==
Seismicity in mines is common as removing mass amounts of rock can change stress dynamics, especially if pre-existing faults exist. This seismicity is termed 'mining-induced seismicity', caused by the release of elastic strain but are often low moment magnitude. Reaching beyond 1,000 events a day, events of any size pose serious risk to mining operations and employees. It is not uncommon for equipment to be damaged, or have the collapse of drifts and stopes as a result of events.

On 27 December 2007 a dyke within Mponeng experienced a 1.9 magnitude event caused by stress change due to excavation within the mine. In March 2020 Mponeng experienced a magnitude 2 earthquake in which 3 people were killed. In deep mines, vertical stress can reach 80–100 MPa, equivalent to roughly 10 km under water. Seismicity in deep gold mines is common, and is often induced by mining activities. Two events can be considered:

- Type A - low moment magnitude (<1), clustered in time and space, within 100m of mining surface.
  - Induced by blasting, perturbation of excavating processes, closure of stopes.
- Type B - possible higher moment magnitude (>3), not clustered in time or space.
  - associated with friction dominated existing shear, tectonic earthquakes.

Most earthquakes at depth are mining related (Type A), typically associated with the beginning of a new stope.

=== Research ===
One way to move forward is a better understanding of rock burst and excavation methods. A better understanding can provide better safety protocols. A prominent use of deep mines and their associated, often low magnitude, earthquakes is to connect laboratory scale experiments to real world situations. There is also considerable research trying to understand nucleation of said earthquakes, and whether they work the same as larger earthquakes. In Mponeng, JAGUARS (Japanese-German Acoustic Emissions Research in South Africa) has emplaced a network of accelerometers and piezoelectric acoustic emissions sensors. These sensors can record very small moment magnitude earthquakes, capable of recording events with frequencies from 0.7 kHz to 200 kHz (M<0.5). In a one-year period, 2007–2008, nearly 500,000 events were recorded, most of which with low (sub 25 kHz) frequencies. The JAGUARS network is placed below the Ventersdorp Contact Reef, there are eight acoustic emissions sensors, two strainmeters, and one triaxial accelerometer that make up the network.

== See also ==
- Gold Mines
- Witwatersrand
- Seismicity
- Tailings
- Gauteng
- Acid mine drainage
