= Thermolithobacteria =

Scientific classification
- Domain: Bacteria
- Kingdom: Bacillati
- Phylum: Bacillota
- Class: Thermolithobacteria; Sokolova et al. 2007

Class of bacteria

Thermolithobacteria is a class of rod-shaped Gram-positive bacteria within phylum Bacillota. Species within this class are thermophilic lithotrophs isolated from sediment in Calcite Springs in Yellowstone National Park. Thermolithobacter ferrireducens strain JW/KA-2(T) metabolism consists of the oxidation of hydrogen gas and reduction of ferric oxide to magnetite. Thermolithobacter carboxydivorans strain R1(T) is hydrogenic and oxidizes carbon monoxide.

== Taxonomy ==
- Order Thermolithobacterales Sokolova et al. 2007
  - Family Thermolithobacteraceae Sokolova et al. 2007
    - Genus Thermolithobacter Sokolova et al. 2007
      - Species T. carboxydivorans Sokolova et al. 2007
      - Species T. ferrireducens Sokolova et al. 2007 (type species)

== See also ==
- List of bacterial orders
- List of bacteria genera
