= Hydrogenophilaceae =

Scientific classification
- Domain: Bacteria
- Kingdom: Pseudomonadati
- Phylum: Pseudomonadota
- Class: Hydrogenophilia; Boden et al., 2022
- Order: Hydrogenophilales; Garrity et al., 2006
- Family: Hydrogenophilaceae; Garrity et al., 2006

Genera
- Hydrogenophilus; Tepidiphilus

Family of bacteria

The Hydrogenophilaceae are a family of the class Hydrogenophilalia in the phylum Pseudomonadota ("Proteobacteria"), with two genera – Hydrogenophilus and Tepidiphilus. Like all Pseudomonadota, they are Gram-negative. All known species are thermophilic, growing around 50 °C, and use molecular hydrogen or organic molecules as their source of electrons to support growth; some species are autotrophs.

The genus Thiobacillus was previously considered to be a member in this family but was reclassified into the order Nitrosomonadales at the same time that the Hydrogenophilales were removed from the Betaproteobacteria to form the class Hydrogenophilalia.

Hydrogenophilus thermoluteolus is a facultative chemolithoautotroph originally isolated from a hot spring; however, it was detected 2004 in ice core samples retrieved from a depth around 3 km within the ice covering Lake Vostok in Antarctica. The presence of DNA from (and potentially live cells of) thermophilic bacteria in the ice suggests that a geothermal system could exist beneath the cold water body of Lake Vostok, or simply that non-thermophilic strains of Hydrogenophilus exist and were present in the ice.

== Hydrogenophilalia ==
The class Hydrogenophilalia in the Bacteria was circumscribed in 2017 when it was demonstrated that the order Hydrogenophilales was distinct from the Betaproteobacteria on the basis of physiology, biochemistry, fatty acid profiles, and phylogenetic analyses on the basis of the 16S rRNA gene and 53 ribosomal protein sequences concatenated using the rMLST platform for multilocus sequence typing.

The class comprises one order, the Hydrogenophilales (type order), which contains thermophilic organisms - both autotrophs and heterotrophs, the former of which utilise molecular hydrogen as their electron donor, coupling its oxidation to the reduction of NAD^{+} with the enzyme hydrogenase. The very high proportion of ω-cyclohexyl fatty acids (specifically C19:0 cyclo and C17:0 cyclo) versus straight counterparts was a major distinguishing feature versus the Betaproteobacteria, and is probably involved in ensuring membrane stability at high growth temperatures. Members of the class can all use molecular oxygen as a terminal electron acceptor (i.e. are aerobic) as well as nitrate, which can be used by some members during denitrification. The autotrophic members of the class do not use carboxysomes to concentrate carbon dioxide or improve RuBisCO efficiency as a carboxylase versus an oxygenase. The dominant respiratory quinone of the class is ubiquinone-8 and menaquinones or rhodoquinones are not observed, though they are in the neighbouring Betaproteobacteria.
