= Zeaxanthinibacter =

Scientific classification
- Domain: Bacteria
- Kingdom: Pseudomonadati
- Phylum: Bacteroidota
- Class: Flavobacteriia
- Order: Flavobacteriales
- Family: Flavobacteriaceae
- Genus: Zeaxanthinibacter; Asker et al. 2007

Species
- Z. aestuarii Z. enoshimensis

Bacterium

Zeaxanthinibacter is a genus of gram-negative bacteria from the family of Flavobacteriaceae.
