= Antarctobacter =

Scientific classification
- Domain: Bacteria
- Kingdom: Pseudomonadati
- Phylum: Pseudomonadota
- Class: Alphaproteobacteria
- Order: Rhodobacterales
- Family: Rhodobacteraceae
- Genus: Antarctobacter; Labrenz et al. 1998

Species
- Antarctobacter heliothermus

Genus of bacteria

Antarctobacter is a genus of bacteria in the family Rhodobacteraceae.
