= Tropicibacter =

Scientific classification
- Domain: Bacteria
- Kingdom: Pseudomonadati
- Phylum: Pseudomonadota
- Class: Alphaproteobacteria
- Order: Rhodobacterales
- Family: Rhodobacteraceae
- Genus: Tropicibacter; Harwati et al. 2009

Type species
- Tropicibacter naphthalenivorans

Species
- T. naphthalenivorans T. phthalicicus

Genus of bacteria

Tropicibacter is a genus of bacteria from the family of Rhodobacteraceae.
