= Maritimibacter =

Scientific classification
- Domain: Bacteria
- Kingdom: Pseudomonadati
- Phylum: Pseudomonadota
- Class: Alphaproteobacteria
- Order: Rhodobacterales
- Family: Rhodobacteraceae
- Genus: Maritimibacter; Lee et al. 2007

Species
- Maritimibacter alkaliphilus

Genus of bacteria

Maritimibacter is a genus of bacteria in the family Rhodobacteraceae.
