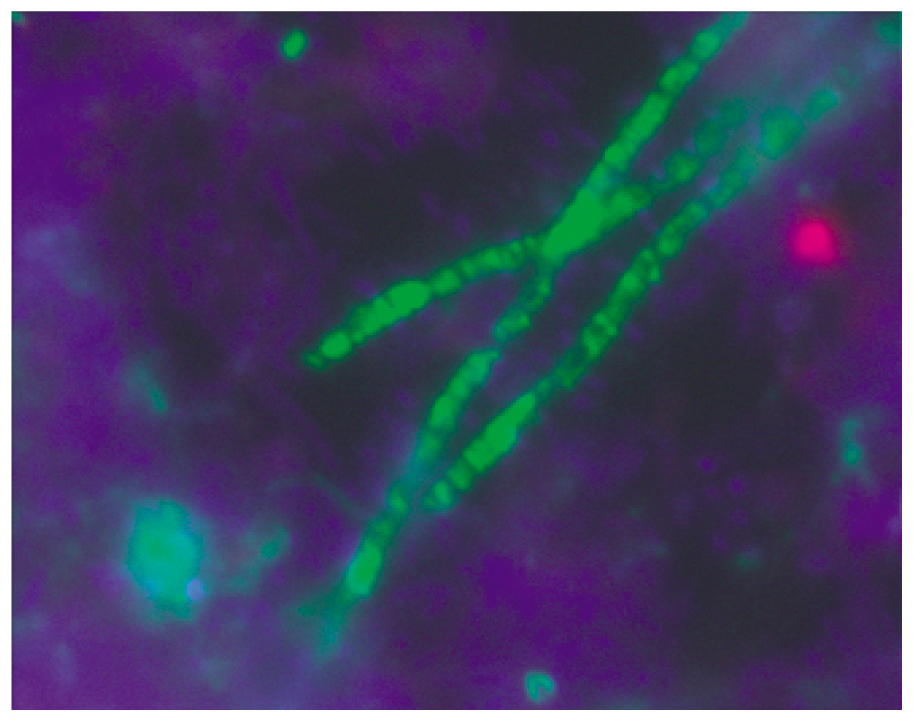
- Acidobacterium cf. capsulatum

Scientific classification
- Domain: Bacteria
- Kingdom: Pseudomonadati
- Phylum: Acidobacteriota
- Class: "Acidobacteriia"; Thrash and Coates 2010

Type genus
- Acidobacterium Kishimoto et al. 1991

Orders
- Acidobacteriales; "Acidiferrales"; Bryobacterales; "Versatilivorales"

Synonyms
- Acidobacteria Cavalier-Smith 2002; "Acidobacteriae" Oren et al. 2015; "Solibacteres" Battistuzzi and Hedges 2009; Terriglobia Thrash & Coates 2022

= Acidobacteriia =

Class of bacteria

The "Acidobacteriia" is a class of Acidobacteriota.

== Phylogeny ==
The currently accepted taxonomy is based on the List of Prokaryotic names with Standing in Nomenclature and National Center for Biotechnology Information (NCBI). Numbered orders do not yet have any cultured representatives.

16S rRNA based phylogeny

- - Order 12
  - - Order 16-2
    - - Acidobacteriales
      - - "Ca. Acidiferrales"
        - - Bryobacterales
          - - Order 9
            - Order 21

16S rRNA based LTP_10_2024

- - Bryobacterales
    Bryobacteraceae
  - Acidobacteriales
    Acidobacteriaceae

120 marker proteins based GTDB 10-RS226

- - - "Versatilivorales"
      "Versatilivoraceae" corrig. Nguyen 2022
  - - - "Acidiferrales"
        "Acidiferraceae" corrig. Epihov et al. 2021
    - - Bryobacterales
        Bryobacteraceae Dedysh et al. 2017
      - Acidobacteriales
        - - "Ca. Angelobacter" Crits-Christoph et al. 2022{Gp1-AA117}
          - - "Korobacteraceae" corrig. Chuvochina et al. 2023
            - "Sulfotelmatobacteraceae" (sic) Pallen, Rodriguez-R & Alikhan 2022 [SbA1]
        - Acidobacteriaceae Thrash & Coates 2012 non Orla-Jesen 1909

== See also ==
- List of bacterial orders
- List of bacteria genera
