= Cohaesibacter =

Scientific classification
- Domain: Bacteria
- Kingdom: Pseudomonadati
- Phylum: Pseudomonadota
- Class: Alphaproteobacteria
- Order: Hyphomicrobiales
- Family: Cohaesibacteraceae; Hwang and Cho 2008
- Genus: Cohaesibacter; Hwang and Cho 2008

Type species
- Cohaesibacter gelatinilyticus

Species
- Cohaesibacter gelatinilyticus Cohaesibacter haloalkalitolerans Cohaesibacter marisflavi

Genus of bacteria

Cohaesibacter is a genus of bacteria from the order Hyphomicrobiales. It is the only genus in the family Cohaesibacteraceae.
