= Thermaerobacter =

Scientific classification
- Domain: Bacteria
- Kingdom: Bacillati
- Phylum: Bacillota
- Class: Thermaerobacteria; Chuvochina et al. 2024
- Order: Thermaerobacterales; Chuvochina et al. 2024
- Family: Thermaerobacteraceae; Chuvochina et al. 2024
- Genus: Thermaerobacter; Takai, Inoue & Horikoshi 1999

Type species
- Thermaerobacter marianensis Takai, Inoue & Horikoshi 1999

Species
- Thermaerobacter composti; Thermaerobacter litoralis; Thermaerobacter marianensis; Thermaerobacter nagasakiensis; Thermaerobacter subterraneus

Genus of bacteria

Thermaerobacter is a genus of bacteria placed within the phylum Bacillota. It was previously placed within the highly polyphyletic class Clostridia, order Clostridiales, according to the NCBI and LPSN.

== Phylogeny ==
The currently accepted taxonomy is based on the List of Prokaryotic names with Standing in Nomenclature (LPSN) and National Center for Biotechnology Information (NCBI).

16S rRNA based LTP_10_2024

- Thermaerobacter
  - - T. marianensis Takai, Inoue & Horikoshi 1999
    - T. nagasakiensis Nunoura et al. 2002
  - - T. subterraneus Spanevello et al. 2002
    - - T. composti Yabe et al. 2010
      - T. litoralis Tanaka et al. 2006

120 marker proteins based GTDB 10-RS226

- Thermaerobacter
  - T. marianensis
  - T. subterraneus
