= Cryptanaerobacter phenolicus =

Scientific classification
- Domain: Bacteria
- Kingdom: Bacillati
- Phylum: Bacillota
- Class: Clostridia
- Order: Desulfotomaculales
- Family: Pelotomaculaceae
- Genus: Cryptanaerobacter
- Species: C. phenolicus

Binomial name
- Cryptanaerobacter phenolicus Juteau et al. 2005

Species of bacterium

Cryptanaerobacter phenolicus is a gram-positive anaerobic bacterial species in the genus Cryptanaerobacter.

The genus Cryptanaerobacter contains a single species, namely C. phenolicus (Type species of the genus).; Neo-Latin noun phenol -olis, phenol; Latin masculine gender suff. -icus, suffix used in adjectives with the sense of belonging to; Neo-Latin masculine gender adjective phenolicus, belonging to phenol.)
