= Subsaxibacter =

Scientific classification
- Domain: Bacteria
- Kingdom: Pseudomonadati
- Phylum: Bacteroidota
- Class: Flavobacteriia
- Order: Flavobacteriales
- Family: Flavobacteriaceae
- Genus: Subsaxibacter; Bowman and Nichols 2005

Species
- S. arcticus S. broadyi S. sediminis

Bacterium

Subsaxibacter is a genus of bacteria from the family of Flavobacteriaceae.
