= Calliostoma marisflavi =

Scientific classification
- Kingdom: Animalia
- Phylum: Mollusca
- Class: Gastropoda
- Subclass: Vetigastropoda
- Order: Trochida
- Superfamily: Trochoidea
- Family: Calliostomatidae
- Subfamily: Calliostomatinae
- Genus: Calliostoma
- Species: C. marisflavi

Binomial name
- Calliostoma marisflavi Huang & Fu, 2015

Species of gastropod

Calliostoma marisflavi is a species of sea snail, a marine gastropod mollusk, in the family Calliostomatidae within the superfamily Trochoidea, the top snails, turban snails and their allies.

== Distribution ==
This species occurs in Yellow Sea.
