= Ulvibacter =

Scientific classification
- Domain: Bacteria
- Kingdom: Pseudomonadati
- Phylum: Bacteroidota
- Class: Flavobacteriia
- Order: Flavobacteriales
- Family: Flavobacteriaceae
- Genus: Ulvibacter; Nedashkovskaya et al. 2004

Species
- "Candidatus U. alkanivorans" U. antarcticus U. litoralis U. marinus

Genus of bacteria

Ulvibacter is a genus of bacteria from the family Flavobacteriaceae. The genus currently contains three validly published species.
