= Fulvibacter =

Scientific classification
- Domain: Bacteria
- Kingdom: Pseudomonadati
- Phylum: Bacteroidota
- Class: Flavobacteriia
- Order: Flavobacteriales
- Family: Flavobacteriaceae
- Genus: Fulvibacter; Khan et al. 2008

Type species
- Fulvibacter tottoriensis

Species
- F. tottoriensis

Genus of bacteria

Fulvibacter is a Gram-negative, rod-shaped and non-motile genus of bacteria from the family of Flavobacteriaceae with one known species (Fulvibacter tottoriensis).
