= Gilvibacter =

Scientific classification
- Domain: Bacteria
- Kingdom: Pseudomonadati
- Phylum: Bacteroidota
- Class: Flavobacteriia
- Order: Flavobacteriales
- Family: Flavobacteriaceae
- Genus: Gilvibacter; Khan et al. 2007

Species
- G. sediminis

Bacterium

Gilvibacter is a Gram-negative, chemoheterotrophic and non-motile genus of bacteria from the family of Flavobacteriaceae with one known species (Gilvibacter sediminis).
