= Rhizobacter =

Scientific classification
- Domain: Bacteria
- Kingdom: Pseudomonadati
- Phylum: Pseudomonadota
- Class: Gammaproteobacteria
- Order: Pseudomonadales
- Family: Pseudomonadaceae
- Genus: Rhizobacter; Goto and Kuwata 1988

Type species
- Rhizobacter dauci

Species
- Rhizobacter bergeniae Wei et al. 2015; Rhizobacter dauci corrig. Goto and Kuwata 1988; Rhizobacter fulvus (Yoon et al. 2007) Stackebrandt et al. 2009; Rhizobacter gummiphilus Imai et al. 2016; Rhizobacter profundi Jin et al. 2016

Genus of bacteria

Rhizobacter is a bacterial genus from the class Gammaaproteobacteria order Pseudomonadales. It is a plant pathogenic bacterium and, like a few other phytopathogenic bacteria, produces tumors in infected plants. It appears to have an extremely wide host range, producing tumors (galls) on the roots, stems and tubers of at least 46 species of plants from 24 families, which includes many economically important species such as tomato (Solanum lycopersicum) and cabbage (Brassica oleracea). The type species, Rhizobacter dauci was first identified causing carrot bacterial gall in Japan and was described in 1988.
