= Rhodoquinone =

Chemical compound

Names
- IUPAC name 5-[(2E,6E,10E,14E,18E,22E,26E,30E,34E)-3,7,11,15,19,23,27,31,35,39-Decamethyltetraconta-2,6,10,14,18,22,26,30,34,38-decaenyl]-2-amino-3-methoxy-6-methylcyclohexa-2,5-diene-1,4-dione

Identifiers
CAS Number	5591-74-2
3D model (JSmol)	Interactive image
ChEBI	CHEBI:46245
ChemSpider	4945485
PubChem CID	6441300
UNII	JVC3PUU81F
- InChI: InChI=1S/C58H89NO3/c1-43(2)23-14-24-44(3)25-15-26-45(4)27-16-28-46(5)29-17-30-47(6)31-18-32-48(7)33-19-34-49(8)35-20-36-50(9)37-21-38-51(10)39-22-40-52(11)41-42-54-53(12)56(60)55(59)58(62-13)57(54)61/h23,25,27,29,31,33,35,37,39,41H,14-22,24,26,28,30,32,34,36,38,40,42,59H2,1-13H3/b44-25+,45-27+,46-29+,47-31+,48-33+,49-35+,50-37+,51-39+,52-41+ Key: WDVDSFZLRFLVJT-AVRCVIBKSA-N
- SMILES: CC1=C(C(=O)C(=C(C1=O)N)OC)C/C=C(\C)/CC/C=C(\C)/CC/C=C(\C)/CC/C=C(\C)/CC/C=C(\C)/CC/C=C(\C)/CC/C=C(\C)/CC/C=C(\C)/CC/C=C(\C)/CCC=C(C)C

Properties
Chemical formula	C_{58}H_{89}NO_{3}
Molar mass	848.354 g·mol^{−1}
- Except where otherwise noted, data are given for materials in their standard state (at 25 °C [77 °F], 100 kPa). Infobox references

Rhodoquinone (RQ) is a modified ubiquinone-like molecule that is an important cofactor used in anaerobic energy metabolism by many organisms. Recently, it has gained attention as a potential anthelmintic drug target due to the fact that parasitic hosts do not synthesize or use this cofactor. Because this cofactor is used in low oxygen environments, many helminth-like organisms have adapted to survive host environments such as areas within the gastrointestinal tract.

== Biosynthesis ==
Currently the biosynthesis of rhodoquinone (RQ) is still being debated, but there are two main biosynthetic pathways that are being researched. The first pathway requires the organism to produce ubiquinone (UQ) before the amino group can be added onto the quinone ring. The second pathway allows RQ to be synthesized without any UQ being present by using tryptophan metabolites instead.

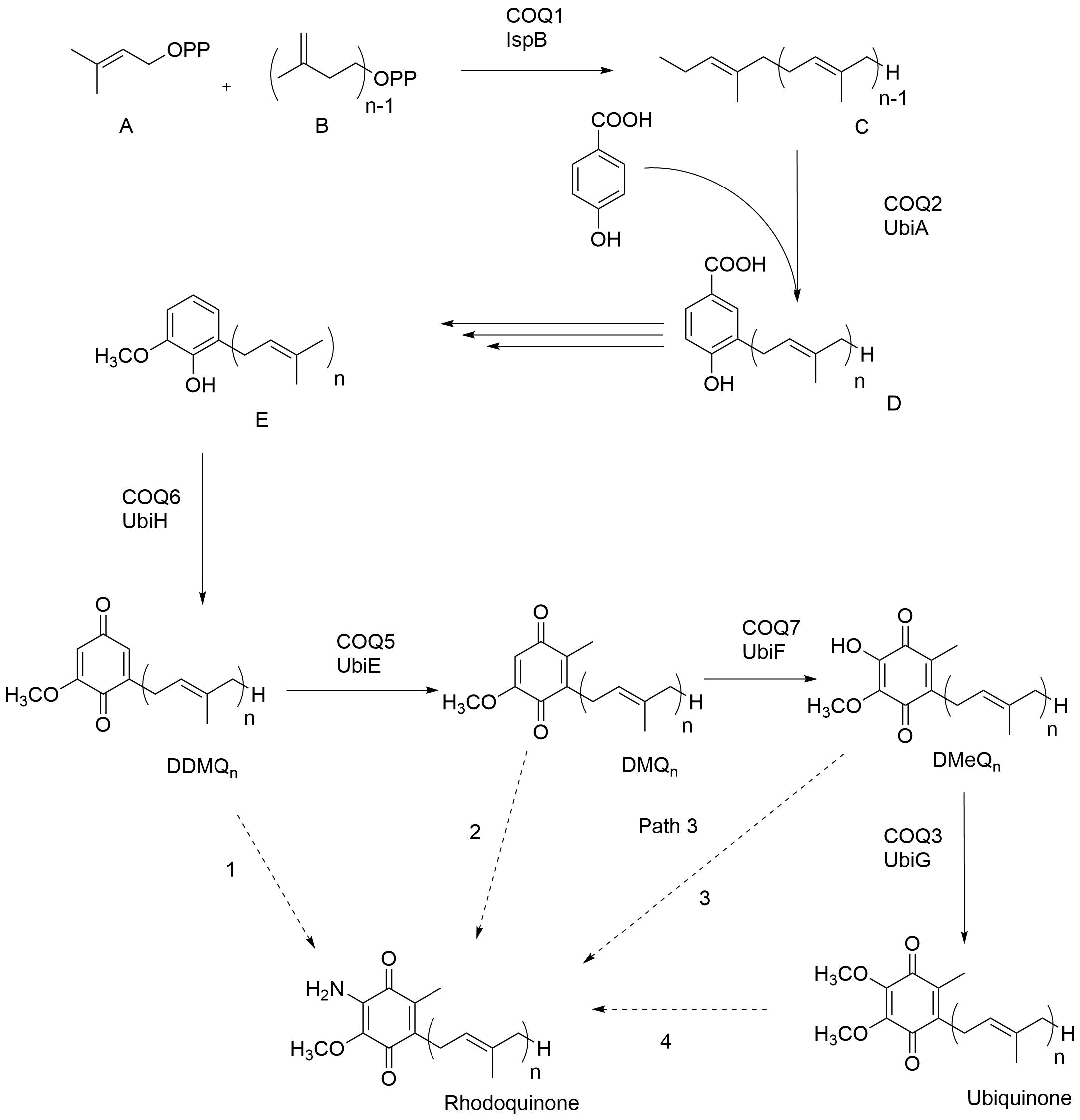
Figure 1. Proposed biosynthesis of rhodoquinone

In the case of the prokaryotic organism R. rubrum, RQ has been shown to be synthesized by addition of an amino group to a pre-existing UQ; thus UQ needs to be present as a precursor before RQ can be made. Figure 1 shows the biosynthesis of UQ in yeast and E. coli where 'n' represents the number of isoprene units between various organisms. Dimethylallyl diphosphate A and isopentyl diphosphate B come together to form polyisoprenyl diphosphate C. With the addition of p-hydroxybenzoic acid, the product that arises is 3-polyprenyl-4-hydroxybenzoic acid D. The next three steps of synthesis varies between different organisms, but molecule E is made across all organisms and through oxidation, demethyldemethoxyubiquinone (DDMQ) is eventually formed. RQ has been theorized to be synthesized from DDMQn, DMQn, DMeQn, or UQn, as shown with the dashed arrows. Recent studies have shown that Path 4 - RQ biosynthesis via UQ, is the favored route. It has been further shown that the gene rquA is required for the biosynthesis of RQ in R. rubrum, and that RquA catalyzes the conversion of UQ to RQ. The RquA protein uses S-adenosyl-L-methionine as the amino donor to convert UQ to RQ in an unusual Mn(II)-catalyzed reaction.

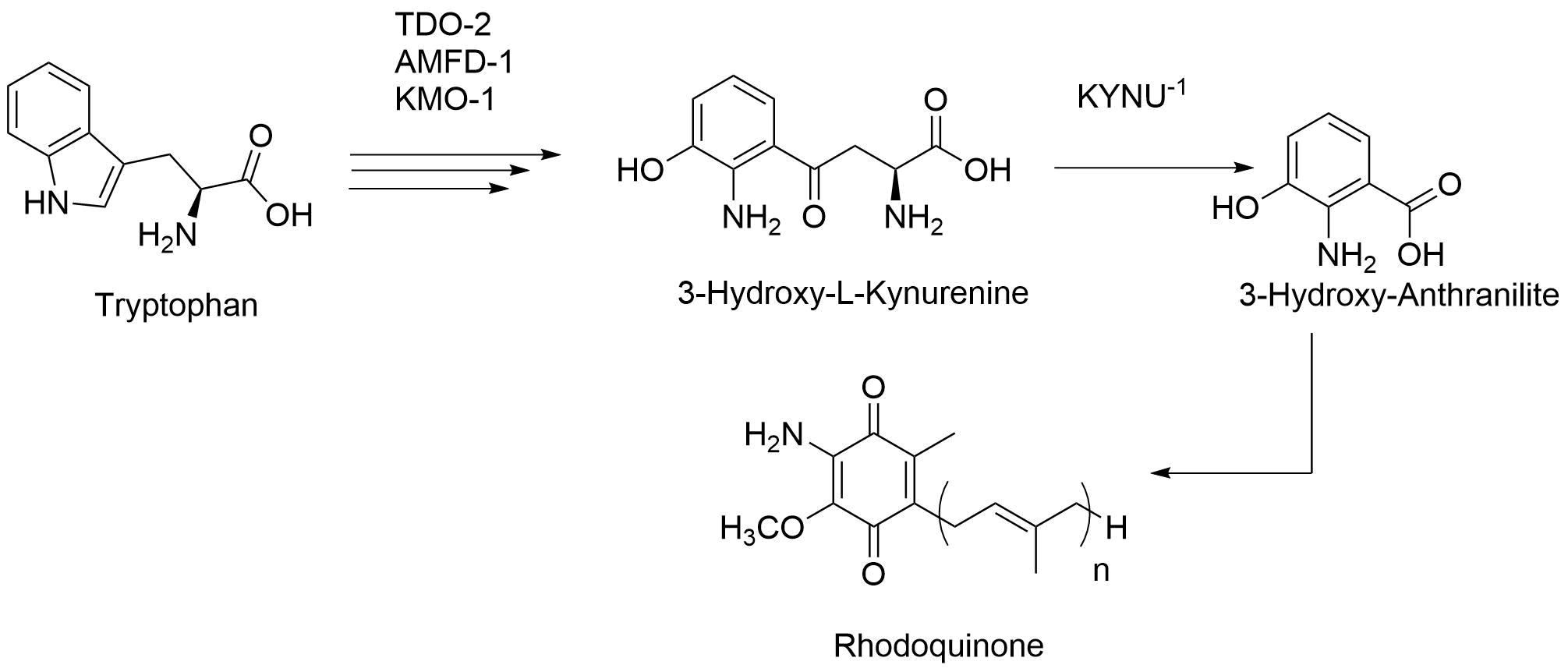
Figure 2. Alternative proposed biosynthesis for rhodoquinone

Research in C. elegans has shown an alternative path for production of RQ. Even after knocking out all UQ production, RQ is still present within those mutant strains. Based on this data, RQ production is not solely based on UQ-like molecules and instead can be made via tryptophan metabolites. Therefore, the amino group that is added in late stages of RQ biosynthesis in rquA-containing species is instead present throughout intermediate stages of RQ biosynthesis in C. elegans. With this proposed biosynthesis, the kynurenine pathway still needs to be upregulated, and activity from certain genes like kynu-1 which encodes for the KYNU-1 enzyme that catalyzes production of 3-hydroxy-L-kynurenine to 3-hydroxyanthranilic acid, needs to be upheld. Recent work has revealed that alternative splicing of the coq-2 polyprenyltransferase gene controls the level of RQ in animals. Animals that produce RQ (e.g. C. elegans and helminth parasites) contain both COQ-2 protein isoforms (COQ-2a and COQ-2e), and COQ-2e catalyzes prenylation of 3-hydroxyanthranilic acid (instead of p-hydroxybenzoic acid) which leads to RQ.

Rhodoquinone can also be chemically synthesized using ubiquinone and aqueous or methanolic ammonia, yielding rhodoquinone of the same isoprenoid chain length and isorhodoquinone, an isomeric by-product.

== Rhodoquinone in Eukaryotes ==
The COQ-2e isoform and RQ have been detected in Mullosca, Platyhelminthes and Nematoda. The presence of RquA and RQ has been confirmed in only a few single celled eukaryotes, namely Pygsuia biforma and Euglena gracilis, although the RquA gene has been identified in a wide array of eukaryotic genome and transcriptomes. Recently rhodoquinone has been detected in mammalian tissues, with the majority being found in the brain and kidneys of mice and humans (up to a 1:3 RQ:UQ ratio in the brain). Rhodoquinone could not be detected in cell lines of tissue origin and has no known biosynthetic pathway in mammals.
