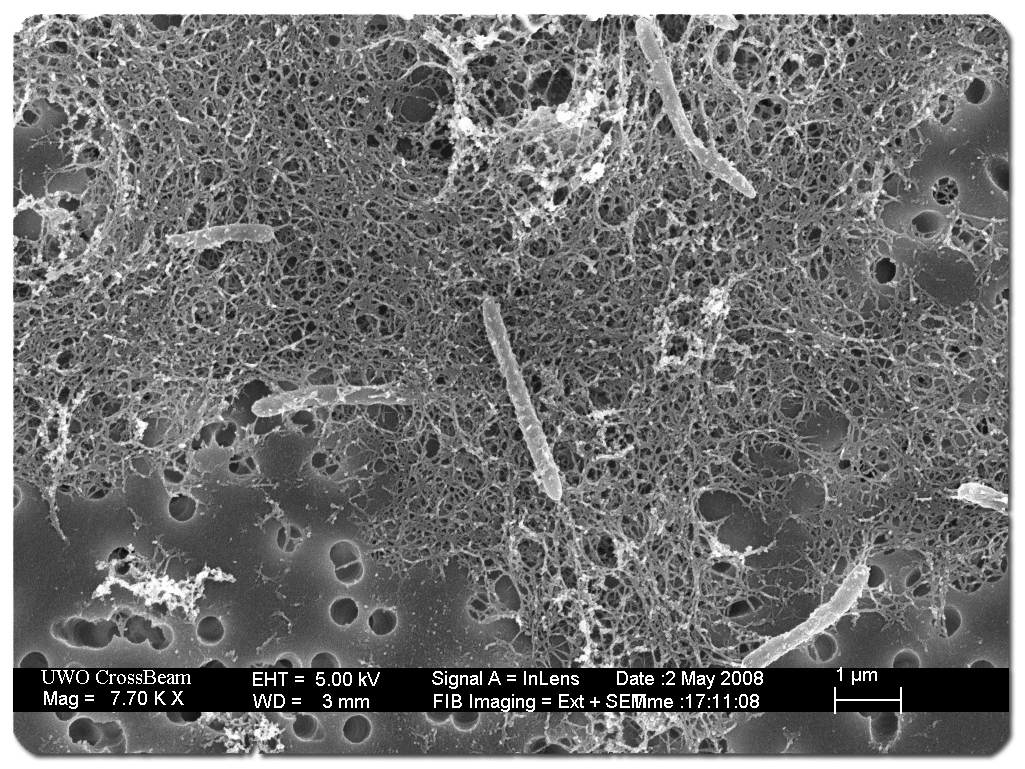
- Desulforudis audaxviator

Scientific classification
- Domain: Bacteria
- Kingdom: Bacillati
- Phylum: Bacillota
- Class: Clostridia
- Order: Eubacteriales
- Family: Peptococcaceae; Rogosa, 1971

Genera
- Desulfonispora; Peptococcus

= Peptococcaceae =

Family of bacteria

The Peptococcaceae are a family of bacteria in the order Eubacteriales.

== Phylogeny ==
The currently accepted taxonomy is based on the List of Prokaryotic names with Standing in Nomenclature (LPSN) and National Center for Biotechnology Information (NCBI).

16S rRNA based LTP_10_2024

- Peptococcales Peptococcaceae
  - Desulfonispora Denger, Stackebrandt & Cook 1999
  - Peptococcus Kluyver & van Niel 1936

120 marker proteins based GTDB 10-RS226

- Peptococcales
  - Desulfonisporaceae
    Desulfonispora
  - Peptococcaceae
    Peptococcus

== See also ==
- List of bacterial orders
- List of bacteria genera
