= Cytophagaceae =

Scientific classification
- Domain: Bacteria
- Kingdom: Pseudomonadati
- Phylum: Bacteroidota
- Class: Cytophagia
- Order: Cytophagales
- Family: Cytophagaceae; Stanier 1940 (Approved Lists 1980)

Genera
- Aquirufa Pitt et al. 2019; Arundinibacter Szuróczki et al. 2019; Chryseotalea Maejima et al. 2020; Cytophaga Winogradsky 1929 (Approved Lists 1980); Edaphorhabdus Chhetri et al. 2019; Litoribacter Tian et al. 2010; "Candidatus Nephrothrix" Møller et al. 2015; Rhodocytophaga Anandham et al. 2010; Sandaracinomonas Chen et al. 2020; "Siccationidurans" Reddy 2013; Sporocytophaga Stanier 1940 (Approved Lists 1980); "Tellurirhabdus" Choi et al. 2019

Family of bacteria

Cytophagaceae is a family of gram-negative bacteria.
