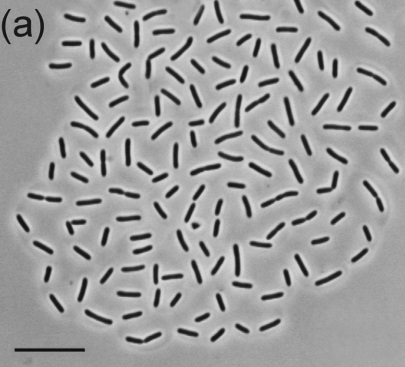
- Granulicella sibirica

Scientific classification
- Domain: Bacteria
- Kingdom: Pseudomonadati
- Phylum: Acidobacteriota
- Class: "Acidobacteriia"
- Order: Acidobacteriales
- Family: Acidobacteriaceae
- Genus: Granulicella; Pankratov & Dedysh 2010

Species
- See text

= Granulicella =

Genus of bacteria

Granulicella is a genus of acidophilic, non-motile, Gram-negative bacteria within the phylum Acidobacteriota, first isolated from acidic sphagnum peat bogs in West Siberia and northern Russia. It belongs to the family Acidobacteriaceae in the class Acidobacteriia and currently includes ten recognized species known for their adaptation to low pH and low-temperature environments. Members of this genus exhibit a range of hydrolytic capabilities, making them ecologically significant in organic matter decomposition and potentially valuable for sustainable agriculture and climate change mitigation efforts.

== Phylogeny ==
The Granulicella genus is within the Acidobacteria phylum which is divided into 26 unique phylogenetic categorizations. These subdivisions are members of seven families currently known and defined as "Acidobacteriaceae, Bryobacteraceae (within class Acidobacteriia), Blastocatellaceae, Pyrinomonadaceae (within class Blastocatellia), Acanthopleuribacteraceae, Holophagaceae (within class Holophagae) and Vicinamibacteraceae (within subdivision 6)." Kuramae and de Assis Costa pointed out that the Acidobacteria phylum (designated after the isolate Acidobacterium capsulatum species), initially designated for bacterium that thrive best under acidic and chemoorganotrophic mineral environments, has no more than 60 species defined currently. The familial grouping of these 60 species is not uniform—39 fall under Acidobacteriia while 13 belong to Blastocatellia. The remaining species are claimed by other families such as Holophagae. The taxonomic ranks designate the genera Acidobacterium and Granulicella as included under the familial grouping of Acidobacteriaceae within class Acidobacteriia. Organisms that fall under the Acidobacteria phylum within the Granulicella genus, such as Granulicella acidiphila, have been isolated from the same location as microbes from the Acidicapsa genus. When researchers Carmen Falagán, Bärbel Foesel, and Barrie Johnson discovered novel species Acidicapsa ferrireducens, Acidicapsa acidiphila, and Granulicella acidiphila from a quarry lake of low pH, they noticed their remarkably similar natures: all were fairly acidophilic, considered obligate heterotrophs and mesophilic, and akin metabolically. Other characteristics that connect Granulicella with different genera include content of genes encoding carbohydrate-active enzyme, known as cazyme, which serve as a marker for the break down of biomass (specifically of lignocellulose variety) which garners interest due to its role in renewable energy and its carbon content. Researchers Marion Coluccia and Ludovic Besaury uncovered genomic data that indicated a similar cazyme percentage within microbes Granulicella mallensis and Edaphobacter aggregans. Carbon and pH content soil environments are contributed towards by Granulicella and Terriglobus genera which exist in substantial quantities within acidic tundra habitats, such as those of northern Finland. Though more recent genetic analysis has revealed that the Granulicella is qualitatively similar to the Acidicapsa, researchers Timofey A. Pankratov and Svetlana N. Dedysh had established that Granulicella is taxonomically most closely related to Terriglobus and Edaphobacter genera at the time of their novel genus proposal.

The currently accepted taxonomy is based on the List of Prokaryotic names with Standing in Nomenclature (LPSN) and National Center for Biotechnology Information (NCBI).

16S rRNA based LTP_10_2024

- - Bryocella elongata
  - - - Granulicella
        - G. mallensis
        - - G. acidiphila
          - - G. cerasi
            - G. paludicola
    - - - Edaphobacter
          - E. acidisoli
          - - E. bradus
            - - E. aggregans
              - - E. flagellatus
                - E. modestus
      - - Edaphobacter dinghuensis
        - - Edaphobacter lichenicola
          - - Granulicella~
              - Granulicella sibirica
              - - Granulicella aggregans
                - - - Granulicella rosea
                    - Granulicella tundricola
                  - - Granulicella pectinivorans
                    - - Granulicella arctica
                      - Granulicella sapmiensis

120 marker proteins based GTDB 10-RS226

- - Granulicella
    - G. cerasi Yamada et al. 2014
    - - - Bryocella elongata Dedysh et al. 2012
        - G. paludicola Pankratov & Dedysh 2010
      - - G. mallensis Mannisto et al. 2012
        - G. sapmiensis Mannisto et al. 2012
  - Edaphobacter
    - - - Granulicella pectinivorans Pankratov & Dedysh 2010
        - Granulicella sibirica Oshkin et al. 2019
      - - Granulicella rosea Pankratov & Dedysh 2010
        - Granulicella tundricola Mannisto et al. 2012
    - - Granulicella aggregans Pankratov & Dedysh 2010
      - - Granulicella arctica Mannisto et al. 2012
        - - - E. lichenicola Belova et al. 2018
            - - Tunturiibacter psychrotolerans corrig. Messyasz et al. 2024
              - - Tunturiibacter empetritectus corrig. Messyasz et al. 2024
                - Tunturiibacter gelidoferens corrig. Messyasz et al. 2024
          - - - E. acidisoli Xia et al. 2017b
              - - E. dinghuensis Wang et al. 2016
                - E. paludis Huber et al. 2024
            - - E. bradus Xia et al. 2018b
              - - E. modestus Koch et al. 2008
                - - E. aggregans Koch et al. 2008
                  - E. flagellatus Xia et al. 2018b

== Discovery ==
Acidobacteria are omnipresent and copious within soil environments but have also been seen inhabiting sediments, peats, water apparatuses, as well as caves that have low pH excavations draining into them. Acidobacteria has been aggregated with a portion of sphagnum peat-obtained 16S rRNA genomic sequences which were later isolated into five cultured strains. Of these five strains, four newly discovered species were produced and were proposed to be classified under the novel genus of Granulicella. The acidic sphagnum peat bog bacterial organisms were initially acquired by researchers Svetlana N. Dedysh, Timofei A. Pankratov, Svetlana E. Belova, Irina S. Kulichevskaya, and Werner Liesack in the year 2006 from a sphagnum peat bog in Plotnikova, (Tomsk area) West Siberia named Bakchar that had a known pH of 3.9 to 4.5. These peat bog samples (retrieved in six different depths in the described wetland environment) were then examined through fluorescence in situ hybridization (FISH), culturing techniques, and 16S rRNA gene molecular sequence-based identification. Two years later, researchers Svetlana N. Dedysh, Timofei A. Pankratov, Irina S. Kulichevskaya, Werner Liesack as well as Yulia M. Serkebaeva isolated strains from the peat bog by cultivating them using media lacking nutrients and FISH. The strains were isolated in 2010 and were identified as TPB6011, TPO1014, TPB6028, OB1010, and LCBR1. The samples that directly resulted in said five strains were acquired from North Russia (bog Obukhovskoe) and West Siberia (Sphagnum peat bog Bakchar). The Granulicella genus that encompassed the following novel species: Granulicella paludicola (strain OB1010 and LCBR1), Granulicella rosea (strain TP01014), Granulicella pectinivorans (strain TPB6011), and Granulicella aggregans (strain TPB6028) was then established. Currently, the genus Granulicella has 10 officially recognized species. In addition to the aforementioned, G. arctica, G. sapmiensis, G. mallensis, and G. tundricola were found in tundra soils in northwestern Finland. Then, the species G. cerasi was isolated from cherry tree bark in Tsukuba, Japan, while G. acidiphila came from a pit lake near an old mine in Spain.

== Morphology ==
The Granulicella genus is characterized by Gram-negative rods that manifest in short chains, pairs, or singles. Certain species such as G. pectinivorans and G. aggregans exhibit themselves in a manner that is more prolonged than typically seen with chains as long as five cells. The classical distinguishing structural feature of Gram-negative cell wall such as the cytoplasmic, peptidoglycan, and outer membranes were made apparent in its electron microscopy cross sections. When grown on solid media, Granulicella form small, irregularly round cloudy or semi-transparent colonies that aggregate as pink-red colonies and produce amorphous substances similar in appearance to extracellular polysaccharides. At first, most colonies were very small (less than 0.5 mm wide), but they grew larger (up to 3–5 mm) after being transferred a few times under more ideal conditions (pH of 3.8–4.5 and temperatures of 15–22 °C).

== Physiology ==
Granulicella is strictly aerobic, dependent on oxygen in order to live. It gains energy through breaking down organic compounds or chemoorganotrophy. It reproduces by splitting into two, a process called binary fission, and does not form spores or move on its own. In general, it prefers to grow using sugars and can break down multiple polysaccharides through hydrolyzation, except for chitin and cellulose. This genus also tests positive for catalase activity, which means that it has antioxidant activity, breaking down toxic hydrogen peroxide, while it is variable with regard to oxidase activity that indicate the presence of cytochrome c oxidase. In comparison to other genera (particularly Terriglobus and Edaphobacter), Granulicella has more hydrolytic capabilities, capable of breaking down more complex carbohydrates. Along with all the previously described main physiological features, there are species specific qualities noted by Timofey A. Pankratov and Svetlana N. Dedysh in their 2010 Granulicella genus proposal. For example, Granulicella paludicola (an organism that tests positive on oxidase and catalase tests) uses carbon sources selectively, has distinct enzyme activities such as valine arylamidase, and is resistant to some antibiotics (ampicillin, gentamicin, neomycin, etc.) while being susceptible to others (lincomycin and novobiocin). In contrast, Granulicella rosea is oxidase negative while having esterase (C8) enzyme activity but lacking valine arylamidase and having a different array of antibiotic response. This array of additional species distinctions occurs across the Granulicella genus.

== Genomics ==
Based on the analysis of the 16S rRNA gene sequences of the first five Granulicella species discovered, they exhibit a 95.3 to 98.9% similarity to each other. Moreover, their guanine and cytosine contents range from 57.3 to 59.3 mol%. It is closest to genera Terriglobus with a 94.6–95.8 % 16S rRNA gene sequence similarity and to Edaphobacter with a 94.2–95.4% similarity. However, these species form a common cluster apart from those from Terriglobus and Edaphobacter when using an algorithm independent of the one used for the phylogenetic tree construction. As confirmed with DNA-DNA hybridization, it demonstrated a low 9 to 20% range of values between these strains and others, implicating that it is a different genus.

== Ecology ==
Granulicella was first found in acidic sphagnum peat bog wetlands in Russia (including Granulicella paludicola) and West Siberia. It is characterized as being mesophilic (prefers moderate temperatures) and acidophilic (grows in acidic environments), uniquely capable of growing in environments below pH 4. Differentiating this genus from others, it is significantly more capable of growing in low temperatures and in the presence of NaCl (sodium chloride).

== Applications ==
It is important to study Granulicella because of its far-reaching implications on food production, sustainability, and climate change. Particularly, its tolerance under extreme conditions in acidic environments, low temperatures, NaCl (sodium chloride) presence, and its ability to produce extracellular polysaccharides (EPS) that improve soil health and thus yield better crop yields and agricultural practices . Moreover, it is effective in breaking down organic matter and carbon sequestration, which makes studying these species auspicious for sustainable practices due to its ability stabilize organic carbon in soils, reduce atmospheric carbon dioxide, and support climate-resilient agriculture. Additionally, the secretion of cazymes within species of the Acidobacteriota phylum play a role in degrading lignocellulosic biomass—an energy resource that can prospectively decrease global reliance on fossil fuels through its synthesis of biological products.

== See also ==
- List of bacterial orders
- List of bacteria genera
