= TBC1D30 =

Protein-coding gene in the species Homo sapiens

Identifiers
- Aliases: TBC1D30, TBC1 domain family member 30
- External IDs: OMIM: 615077; MGI: 1921944; GeneCards: TBC1D30

Gene location (Human)
| Chr. | Chromosome 12 (human) |
| Band | 12q14.3 | Start | 64,759,484 bp |
| Band | 12q14.3 | End | 64,881,033 bp |

Gene location (Mouse)
| Chr. | Chromosome 10 (mouse) |
| Band | 10|10 D2 | Start | 121,099,725 bp |
| Band | 10|10 D2 | End | 121,187,183 bp |
RNA expression pattern
| Bgee | Human / Mouse (ortholog); Top expressed in: endothelial cell; Brodmann area 23; middle temporal gyrus; primary visual cortex; retinal pigment epithelium; body of pancreas; islet of Langerhans; testicle; postcentral gyrus; Brodmann area 46 / Top expressed in: primary visual cortex; superior frontal gyrus; neural layer of retina; primary motor cortex; olfactory epithelium; dentate gyrus of hippocampal formation granule cell; cerebellar cortex; prefrontal cortex; lumbar subsegment of spinal cord; pontine nuclei; More reference expression data |
| BioGPS | n/a |
Gene ontology
| Molecular function | GTPase activator activity |
| Cellular component | ciliary basal body; membrane; endomembrane system; cytosol; plasma membrane; cilium |
| Biological process | negative regulation of cilium assembly; activation of GTPase activity; regulation of vesicle fusion; intracellular protein transport; positive regulation of GTPase activity |
Sources:Amigo / QuickGO
Orthologs
| Databases | NCBI: entry; OMA: entry |
| Species | Human | Mouse |
| Entrez | 23329 | 74694 |
| Ensembl | ENSG00000111490 | ENSMUSG00000052302 |
| UniProt | Q9Y2I9 | Q69ZT9 |
| RefSeq (mRNA) | NM_015279; NM_001330186; NM_001330187; NM_001330188; NM_001364838 | NM_029057; NM_001361015 |
| RefSeq (protein) | NP_001317115; NP_001317116; NP_001317117; NP_056094; NP_001351767 | NP_083333; NP_001347944 |
| Location (UCSC) | Chr 12: 64.76 – 64.88 Mb | Chr 10: 121.1 – 121.19 Mb |
| PubMed search |
- Wikidata
| View/Edit Human | View/Edit Mouse |

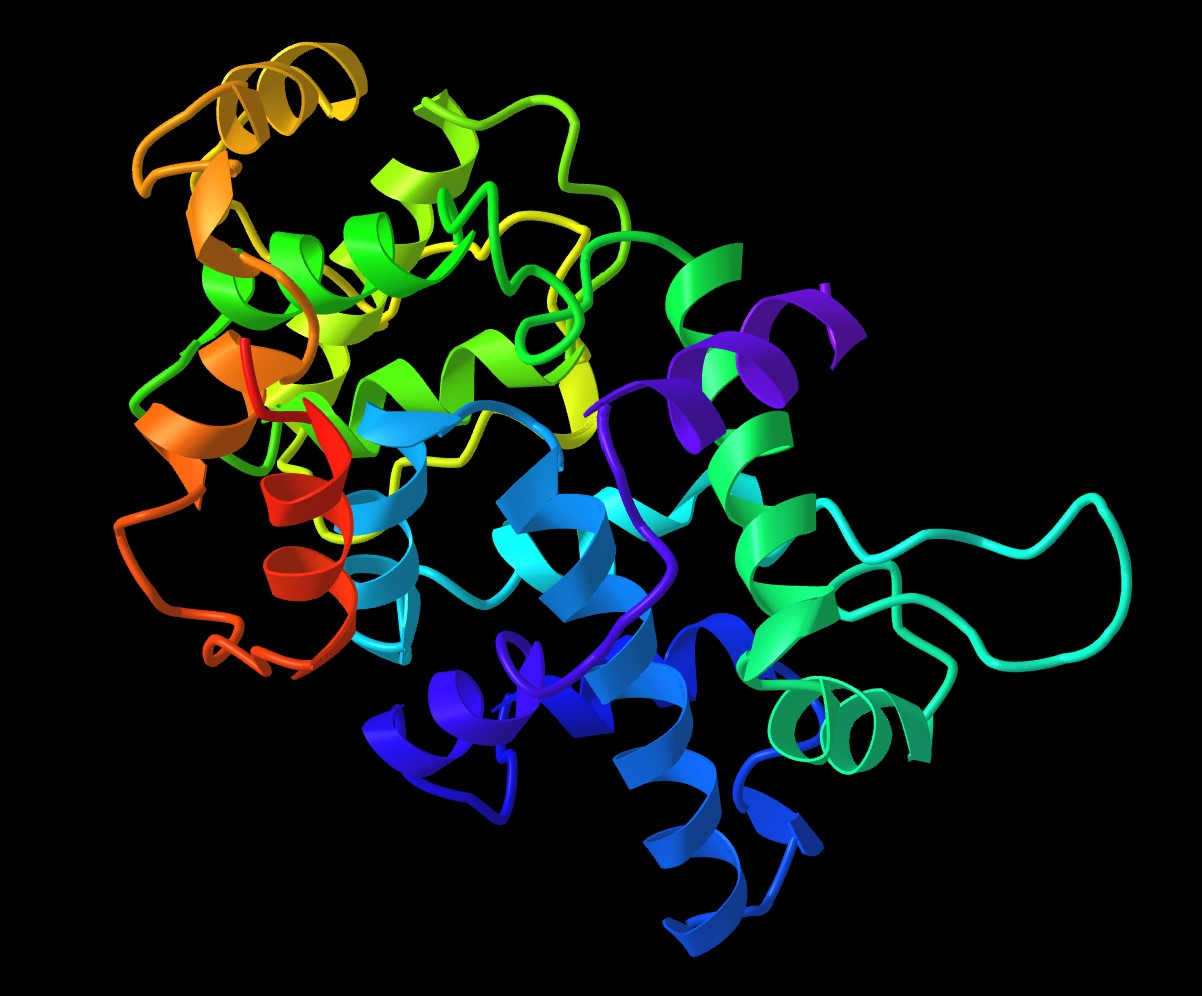
A prediction of the 3D structure of the TBC1D30 protein containing 275 of the 944 amino acids, including the RabGAP-TBC domain, modelled with 100% confidence. The colors show the direction of the protein, with red being the first amino acids, and blue/purple being the last amino acids.

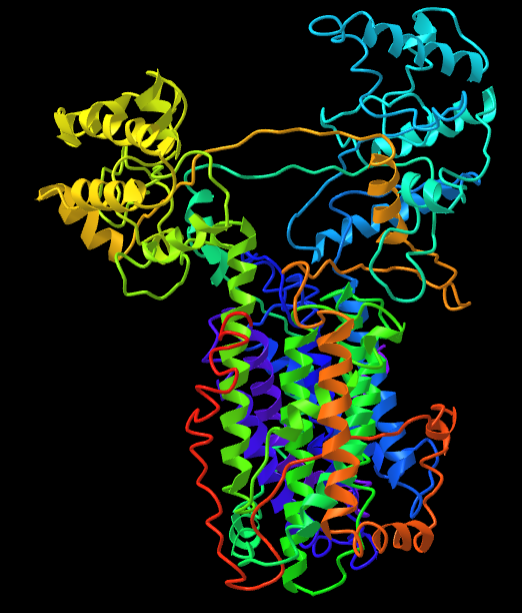
A proposed 3D structure for the TBC1D30 protein. The colors show the direction of the protein according to the colors of the rainbow, with red being the start and blue/purple being the end of the protein, or amino acid sequence.

TBC1D30 is a gene in the human genome that encodes the protein of the same name. This protein has two domains, one of which is involved in the processing of the Rab protein. Much of the function of this gene is not yet known, but it is expressed mostly in the brain and adrenal cortex.

== Gene ==
TBC1D30, also known as KIAA0984, is a protein in the 12th chromosome of the human genome at 12q14.3. The gene for the protein includes two domains: the RabGAP-TBC domain, and the DUF4682 domain. This gene spans 100,076 base pairs in the human genome, but gets condensed down into 7,931 bp for the mRNA transcript, and finally 944 amino acids in its isoform X1 with 12 exons.

=== Transcripts ===
There are 9 isoforms of TBC1D30, 3 of which are independent of the genome build.

Table 1. Isoforms for TBC1D30
| Transcript Name | RNA Accession Number | Protein Accession Number | Size | Domains |
|---|---|---|---|---|
| TBC1 domain family member 30 isoform 1 | NM_015279.2 | NP_001317117.1 | 761 aa | 2 |
| TBC1 domain family member 30 isoform 2 | NM_001330186.2 | NP_001317115.1 | 737 aa | 0 |
| TBC1 domain family member 30 isoform 3 | NM_001330187.2 | NP_001317116.1 | 647 aa | 2 |
| TBC1 domain family member 30 isoform X1 | XM_024448901.1 | XP_024304669.1 | 944 aa | 2 |
| TBC1 domain family member 30 isoform X2 | XM_024448902.1 | XP_024304670.1 | 924 aa | 2 |
| TBC1 domain family member 30 isoform X3 | XM_024448903.1 | XP_024304671.1 | 900 aa | 2 |
| TBC1 domain family member 30 isoform X4 | XM_011538078.2 | XP_011536380.1 | 781 aa | 2 |
| TBC1 domain family member 30 isoform X5 | XM_024448904.1 | XP_024304672.1 | 667 aa | 2 |
| TBC1 domain family member 30 isoform X6 | XM_017019087.2 | XP_016874576.1 | 647 aa | 2 |

The first three in the list are independent of the reference genome. The latter 6, labelled with an X, are based on NC_000012.12 Reference GRCh38.p13 Primary Assembly. The domains for each isoform that contains domains are the same RabGAB-TBC and DUF4682 domains. The size column shows the number of amino acids in each protein isoform.

== Protein ==
TBC1D30 has an isoelectric point of about 8.5. Antibodies revealed TBC1D30 to have a molecular weight of about 90 kDa.

=== Gene level regulation ===
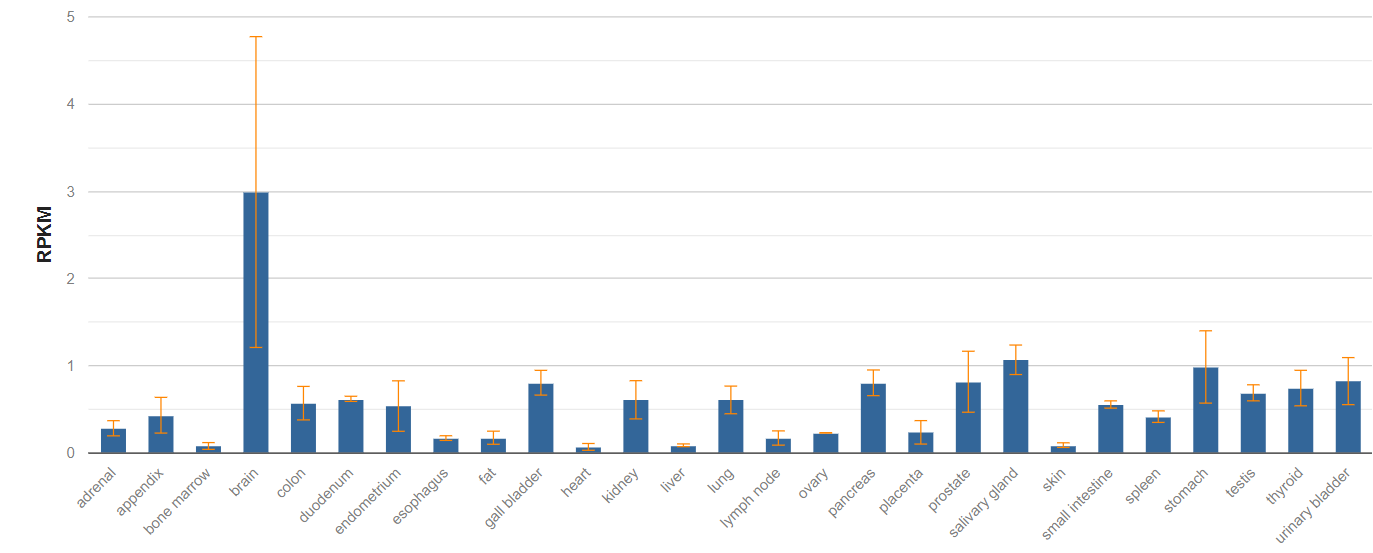
RNA-seq was completed on 95 individuals from 27 different tissues.

The most likely promoter for TBC1D30 is about 1,279 base pairs, with a start at 64,779,516 and an end at 64,780,794.

The TBC1D30 protein has been found in or associated with the cytoplasm and the plasma membrane from antibody studies.

The protein is mostly found to be expressed in tissues of the brain and adrenal glands.

=== Transcript level regulation ===
There is a microRNA binding site within the 3' UTR of the TBC1D30 gene for the hsa-miR-194-5p miRNA. This microRNA is involved in the Wnt/Beta-catenin signaling pathway.

=== Protein level regulation ===
The protein contains some possible myristoylation, amination, and phosphorylation sites. There are also some degradation sites within the RabGAP-TBC domain.

== Homology and evolution ==
TBC1D30 has a large amount of orthologs. Analysis of these homologs allow us to ascertain the most important amino acids, i.e., the ones that are conserved. The most highly conserved amino acids among vertebrates, invertebrates, fungi, plants, bacteria and protists with available sequences were trp236, arg255, trp259, ile297, asp300, arg303, thr304, leu321, leu325, ala327, gly336, tyr337, cys338, gln339, leu349, glu356, pro399, trp432, trp450, asp451, arg463, and leu466. The RabGAP domain within the gene originated approximately 4 billion years ago, as it is present within Terriglobus roseus, which is an acidobacterium that diverged from humans 4.09 billion years ago. The whole gene likely originated approximately 1.3 billion years ago, as there are still amino acids conserved past the RabGAP domain, and into the DUF4682 domain for Lithospermum erythrorhizon and Nicotiana attenuata. These two plants diverged from humans about 1.275 billions years ago.

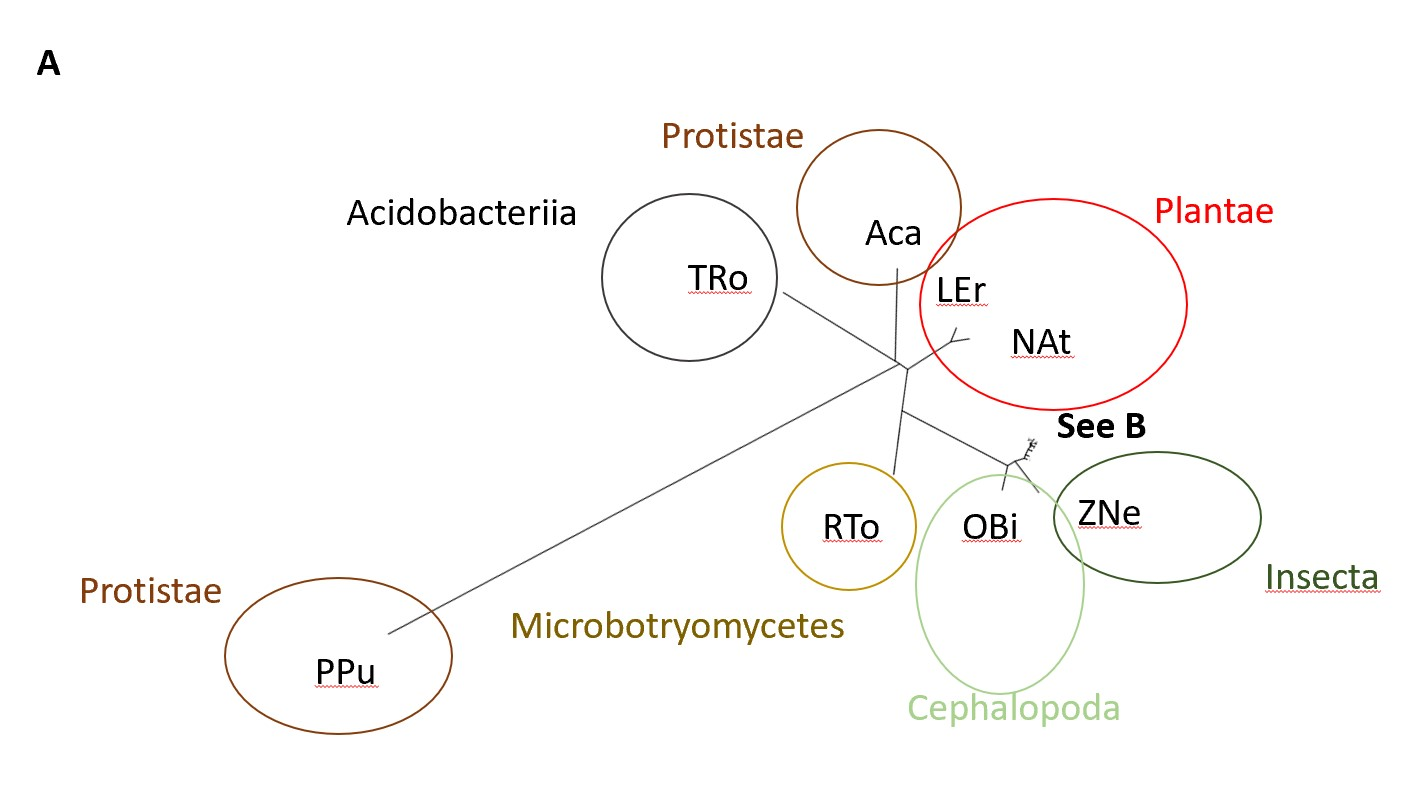
A) Unrooted phylogenetic tree of the most distant orthologs. PPu: Porphyridium purpureum (Red Marine Microalga), TRo: Terriglobus roseus, ACa: Acanthamoeba castellanii str. Neff, LEr: Lithospermum erythrorhizon (Purple Gromwell), Nat: Nicotiana attenuata (Coyote Tobacco), ZNe: Zootermopsis nevadensis (Nevada Termite), Obi: Octopus bimaculoides (California Two-Spot Octopus), RTo: Rhodotorula toruloides (Yeast). See Part B for the closer related orthologs to Homo sapiens.

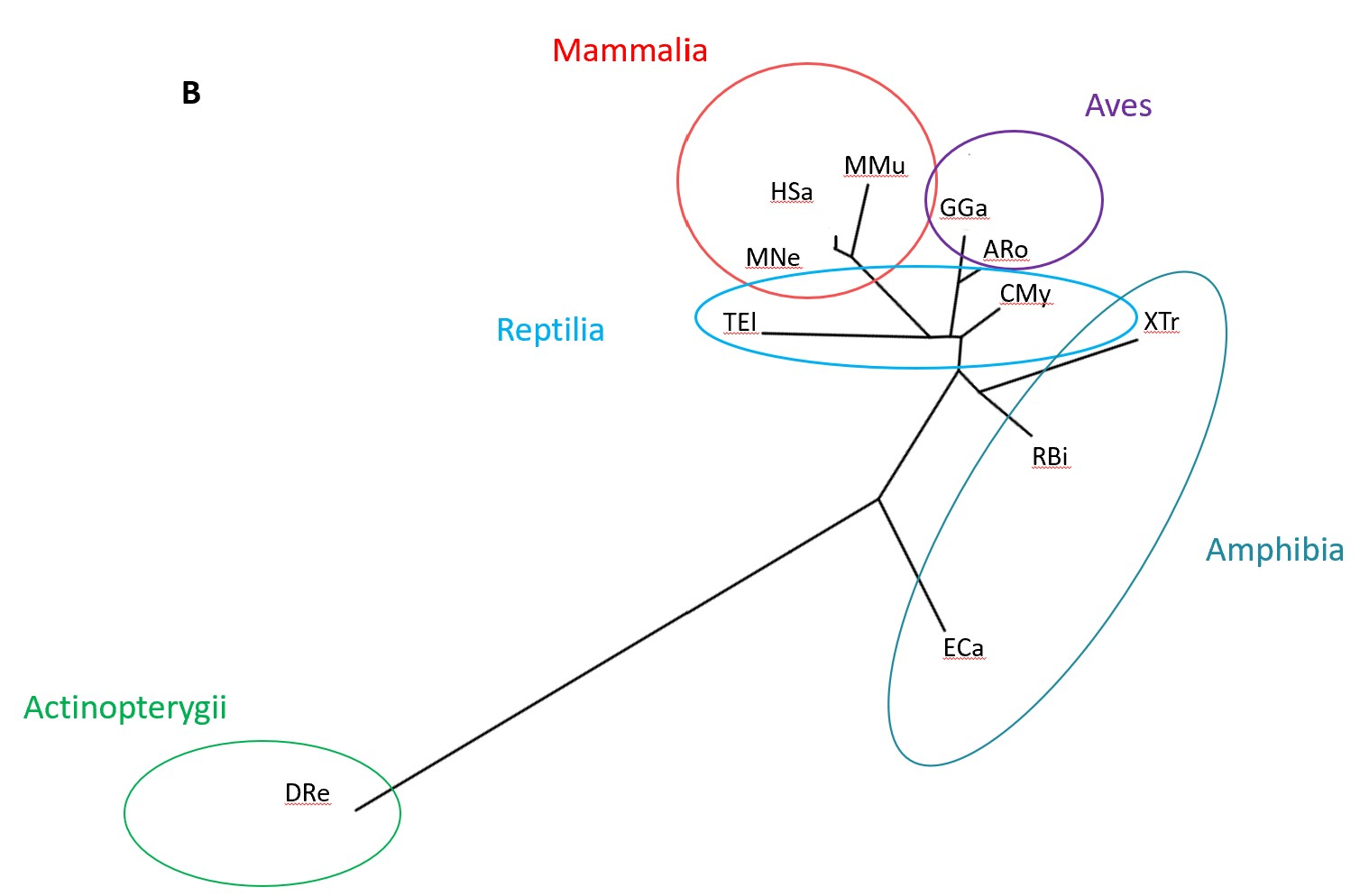
B) Unrooted phylogenetic tree of the closer related orthologs. Dre: Danio rerio (Zebrafish), TEl: Thamnophis elegans (Western Terrestrial Garter Snake), MNe: Macaca nemestrina (Southern Pig-Tailed Macaque), HSa: Homo sapiens, MMu: Mus musculus (House Mouse), GGa: Gallus gallus (Red Junglefowl), ARo: Apteryx rowi (Okarito kiwi), CMy: Chelonia mydas (Green Sea Turtle), XTr: Xenopus tropicalis (Western Clawed Frog), RBi: Rhinatrema bivittatum (Two-Lined Caecilian), ECa: Erpetoichthys calabaricus (Reed Fish).

The gene is evolving at a slower pace than Fibrinogen alpha, which evolves very quickly, but at a faster pace than Cytochrome C, which evolves very slowly.

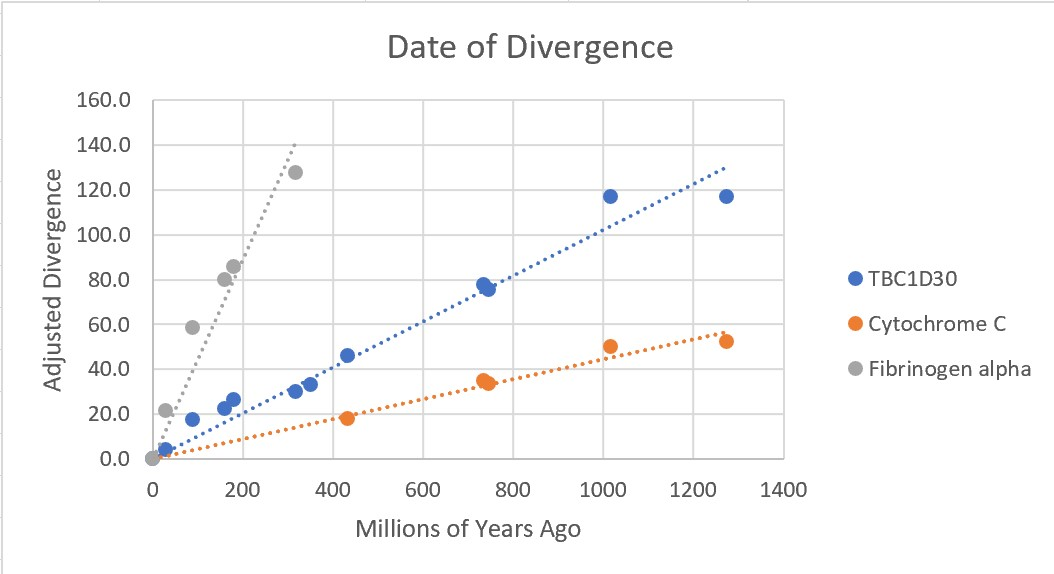
The rate of divergence, and thus evolution, is compared to that of Fibrinogen alpha, and Cytochrome C. The organisms included, in order of most recent to most distant, are Homo sapiens, Macaca fascicularis, Mus musculus, Monodelphis domestica, Ornithorhynchus anatinus, Gallus gallus, Xenopus tropicalis, Danio rerio, Zootermopsis nevadensis, Trichoplax, Saccharomyces cerevisiae, and Arabidopsis thaliana. For the TBC1D30 line. Cytochrome C used Danio rerio, Zootermopsis nevadensis, Trichoplax, Saccharomyces cerevisiae, and Arabidopsis thaliana. Fibrinogen alpha used Homo sapiens, Macaca fascicularis, Mus musculus, Monodelphis domestica, Ornithorhynchus anatinus, and Gallus gallus.

== Interacting proteins ==
TBC1D30 likely interacts with STX3, ZRANB1 and ESR1. These interactions were found through affinity capture and Western blot, affinity capture and mass spectrometry, and two-hybrid screening respectively.

== Clinical significance ==
A Single Nucleotide Polymorphism (SNP), rs11615287, at the start of the RabGAP-TBC domain is likely to be damaging to the protein.

Studies have investigated how TBC1D30 affects insulin processing.
