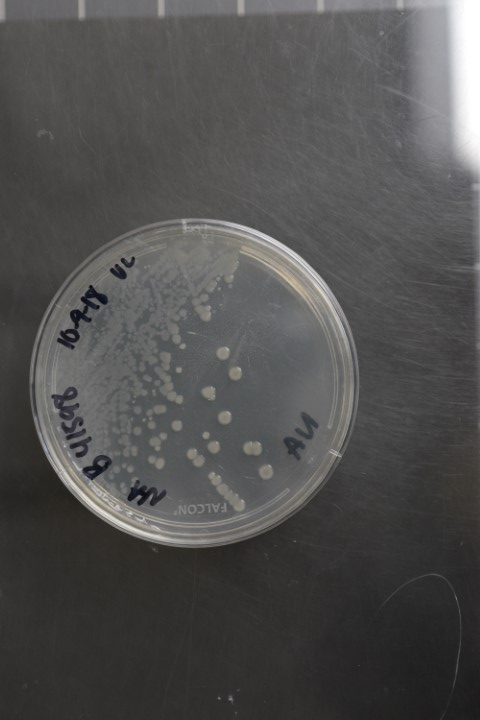

Scientific classification
- Domain: Bacteria
- Kingdom: Pseudomonadati
- Phylum: Acidobacteriota
- Class: "Acidobacteriia"
- Order: Acidobacteriales
- Family: Acidobacteriaceae
- Genus: Terriglobus
- Species: T. roseus

Binomial name
- Terriglobus roseus Eichorst et al. 2007

= Terriglobus roseus =

Species of bacteria

Terriglobus roseus is a bacterium belonging to subdivision 1 of the Acidobacteriota phylum, and is closely related to the genera Granulicella and Edaphobacter. T. roseus was the first species recognized in the genus Terriglobus in 2007. This bacterial species is extremely abundant and diverse in agricultural soils. T. roseus is an aerobic Gram-negative rod lacking motility. This bacteria can produce extracellular polymeric substances (EPS) to form a biofilm, or extracellular matrix, for means of protection, communication amongst neighboring cells, etc. Its type strain is KBS 63.

As implied by its name, on solid media, the bacterial colonies produce a pink pigmentation, indicating the presence of carotenoids. T. roseus grows best at room temperature (23 °C) in a liquid media called R2B, containing peptone, casamino acids, yeast extract, glucose, soluble starch, sodium pyruvate and inorganic salts. Although T. roseus is found in soil and sediment environments, it is highly difficult to culture Acidobacteriota in lab settings. Currently, there is no sufficient growth media that allows for T. roseus to grow in soil. This species optimal pH for growth is pH6, however this species can survive in acidic conditions as low as pH 5.

== Ecology ==
T. roseus, common among all Acidobacteriota, is ubiquitous in soil environments with low nutrient availability, and are relatively wide-spread throughout the soil. Its high abundance in agricultural soils suggests that T. roseus plays a critical role in nutrient cycling. The ability for T. roseus to produce EPS serves many possible benefits to this bacteria and its surrounding environment. Production of biofilms can aid to protect T. roseus and other organisms inhabiting the extracellular matrix, collect water and nutrients for easier accessibility, and could potentially play a role in forming soil aggregates, which would allow for more flow of water and air through the biofilm community.

== Metabolism ==
T. roseus is an aerobic bacterium that is catalase positive and oxidase negative. Although these bacteria are aerobic, T. roseus is capable of surviving at atmospheric concentrations as low as 2% oxygen. These bacteria are chemo-organotrophs, meaning they create energy by oxidizing organic matter, making them versatile in terms of generating energy. T. roseus was found to oxidize glucose, fructose, galactose, mannose, xylose, sucrose, maltose, arabinose, cellobiose, and many more organic compounds. However, T. roseus is unable to utilize mannitol, carboxymethyl cellulose, sodium acetate, sodium pyruvate or monomers of lignin compounds.

In lab culture, T. roseus has demonstrated an increase of growth correlating with several factors, including elevated carbon dioxide levels, decreased availability of nutrients and carbon sources, and additional polymeric substrates to induce growth and enzyme activity, like xylan and chitosan. T. roseus has a slow growth rate, suggesting these bacteria are oligotrophic microorganisms.

== Genomic features ==
The genome of T. roseus is nearly 5.25 million base pairs long with a 60% GC content. Its genome has an interestingly high percentage of repeat sequences at 18% of all DNA. T. roseus has two copies of its 16S ribosomal RNA, which is suggestive evidence that T. roseus is an oligotroph, in addition to its slow growth rate and low nutrient sources. Previous research has shown a correlation between the number of copies of the 16S rRNA and the relative metabolism of the organism. The low number of copies of 16S rRNA in T. roseus supports the slow growth rate of the bacteria.

Although there has been an increase in research being performed on Acidobacteriota, more research is still needed to better understand how these bacteria, T. roseus in particular, contribute to the environment around them.
