= Acidicapsa ligni =

Scientific classification
- Domain: Bacteria
- Kingdom: Pseudomonadati
- Phylum: Acidobacteriota
- Class: "Acidobacteriia"
- Order: Acidobacteriales
- Family: Acidobacteriaceae
- Genus: Acidicapsa
- Species: A. ligni

Binomial name
- Acidicapsa ligni Kulichevskaya et al. 2012

Type strain
- LMG 26244, NCCB 100371, VKM B-2677, WH120

Species of bacterium

Acidicapsa ligni is a Gram-negative, short rods and non-motile bacterium from the genus of Acidicapsa which has been isolated from decaying wood from a broadleaf forest in Netherlands.

A. ligni is an anicidophilic bacterium, thriving in the acidic environmental conditions created by the fungal decay of wood. With a pH growth range of 3.5-6.4 and an optimum around pH 4.0-4.5.it is well-adapted to the low pH levels found in rotting wood ecosystems. This bacterium is an aerobic chemoheterotroph, obtaining its energy and carbon from the breakdown of organic compounds.
