= Acidicapsa borealis =

Scientific classification
- Domain: Bacteria
- Kingdom: Pseudomonadati
- Phylum: Acidobacteriota
- Class: "Acidobacteriia"
- Order: Acidobacteriales
- Family: Acidobacteriaceae
- Genus: Acidicapsa
- Species: A. borealis

Binomial name
- Acidicapsa borealis Kulichevskaya et al. 2012

Type strain
- DSM 23886, KA1, LMG 25897, VKM B-2678

Species of bacterium

Acidicapsa borealis is a Gram-negative, short rods and non-motile bacterium from the genus of Acidicapsa which has been isolated from sphagnum peat from the Tver Region in Russia.
