= Acidipila rosea =

Scientific classification
- Domain: Bacteria
- Kingdom: Pseudomonadati
- Phylum: Acidobacteriota
- Class: "Acidobacteriia"
- Order: Acidobacteriales
- Family: Acidobacteriaceae
- Genus: Acidipila
- Species: A. rosea

Binomial name
- Acidipila rosea Okamura et al. 2015

Type strain
- AP8, KCTC 23427, NBRC 107607

Species of bacterium

Acidipila rosea is a Gram-negative, chemoorganotrophic, acidophilic and non-motile bacterium from the genus of Acidipila which has been isolated from an acid mine drainage.
