= Acidicapsa acidisoli =

Scientific classification
- Domain: Bacteria
- Kingdom: Pseudomonadati
- Phylum: Acidobacteriota
- Class: "Acidobacteriia"
- Order: Acidobacteriales
- Family: Acidobacteriaceae
- Genus: Acidicapsa
- Species: A. acidisoli

Binomial name
- Acidicapsa acidisoli Matsuo et al. 2017

Type strain
- DSM 100508, NBRC 111227, SK-11

Species of bacterium

Acidicapsa acidisoli is a gram-negative, aerobic and non-motile bacterium from the genus of Acidicapsa which has been isolated from acidic soil from a deciduous forest from the Mount Shirakami in Japan.
