= Acidicapsa dinghuensis =

Scientific classification
- Domain: Bacteria
- Kingdom: Pseudomonadati
- Phylum: Acidobacteriota
- Class: "Acidobacteriia"
- Order: Acidobacteriales
- Family: Acidobacteriaceae
- Genus: Acidicapsa
- Species: A. dinghuensis

Binomial name
- Acidicapsa dinghuensis Ou et al. 2018

Species of bacterium

Acidicapsa dinghuensis is a Gram-negative, aerobic and non-motile bacterium from the genus of Acidicapsa which has been isolated from forest soil from the Dinghushan Biosphere Reserve in China.
