= Acidipila dinghuensis =

Scientific classification
- Domain: Bacteria
- Kingdom: Pseudomonadati
- Phylum: Acidobacteriota
- Class: "Acidobacteriia"
- Order: Acidobacteriales
- Family: Acidobacteriaceae
- Genus: Acidipila
- Species: A. dinghuensis

Binomial name
- Acidipila dinghuensis Jiang et al. 2016

Type strain
- DHOF10, CGMCC 1.13007, KCTC 42631

Synonyms
- Acidipila chinensis

Species of bacterium

Acidipila dinghuensis is a chemoorganotrophic, aerobic and non-motile bacterium from the genus of Acidipila which has been isolated from the forest of Dinghushan Biosphere Reserve in the Guangdong Province in China.
