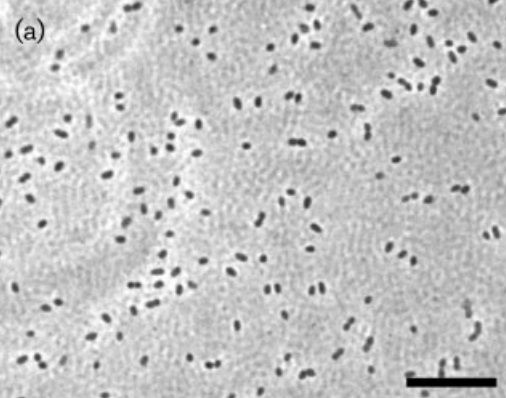
- Edaphobacter modestus

Scientific classification
- Domain: Bacteria
- Kingdom: Pseudomonadati
- Phylum: Acidobacteriota
- Class: "Acidobacteriia"
- Order: Acidobacteriales
- Family: Acidobacteriaceae
- Genus: Edaphobacter; Koch et al. 2008

Type species
- Edaphobacter modestus Koch et al. 2008

Species
- E. acidisoli; E. aggregans; E. bradus; E. dinghuensis; E. flagellatus; E. lichenicola; E. modestus; E. paludis

= Edaphobacter =

Genus of bacterium

Edaphobacter is a genus of Gram-negative, rod shaped bacteria. It contains seven species:

== Phylogeny ==
The currently accepted taxonomy is based on the List of Prokaryotic names with Standing in Nomenclature (LPSN) and National Center for Biotechnology Information (NCBI).

16S rRNA based LTP_10_2024

- - Bryocella elongata
  - - - Granulicella
        - G. mallensis
        - - G. acidiphila
          - - G. cerasi
            - G. paludicola
    - - - Edaphobacter
          - E. acidisoli
          - - E. bradus
            - - E. aggregans
              - - E. flagellatus
                - E. modestus
      - - Edaphobacter dinghuensis
        - - Edaphobacter lichenicola
          - - Granulicella~
              - Granulicella sibirica
              - - Granulicella aggregans
                - - - Granulicella rosea
                    - Granulicella tundricola
                  - - Granulicella pectinivorans
                    - - Granulicella arctica
                      - Granulicella sapmiensis

120 marker proteins based GTDB 10-RS226

- - Granulicella
    - G. cerasi Yamada et al. 2014
    - - - Bryocella elongata Dedysh et al. 2012
        - G. paludicola Pankratov & Dedysh 2010
      - - G. mallensis Mannisto et al. 2012
        - G. sapmiensis Mannisto et al. 2012
  - Edaphobacter
    - - - Granulicella pectinivorans Pankratov & Dedysh 2010
        - Granulicella sibirica Oshkin et al. 2019
      - - Granulicella rosea Pankratov & Dedysh 2010
        - Granulicella tundricola Mannisto et al. 2012
    - - Granulicella aggregans Pankratov & Dedysh 2010
      - - Granulicella arctica Mannisto et al. 2012
        - - - E. lichenicola Belova et al. 2018
            - - Tunturiibacter psychrotolerans corrig. Messyasz et al. 2024
              - - Tunturiibacter empetritectus corrig. Messyasz et al. 2024
                - Tunturiibacter gelidoferens corrig. Messyasz et al. 2024
          - - - E. acidisoli Xia et al. 2017b
              - - E. dinghuensis Wang et al. 2016
                - E. paludis Huber et al. 2024
            - - E. bradus Xia et al. 2018b
              - - E. modestus Koch et al. 2008
                - - E. aggregans Koch et al. 2008
                  - E. flagellatus Xia et al. 2018b

== See also ==
- List of bacterial orders
- List of bacteria genera
