= Edaphobacter aggregans =

Scientific classification
- Domain: Bacteria
- Kingdom: Pseudomonadati
- Phylum: Acidobacteriota
- Class: "Acidobacteriia"
- Order: Acidobacteriales
- Family: Acidobacteriaceae
- Genus: Edaphobacter
- Species: E. aggregans

Binomial name
- Edaphobacter aggregans Koch et al. 2008

Species of bacterium

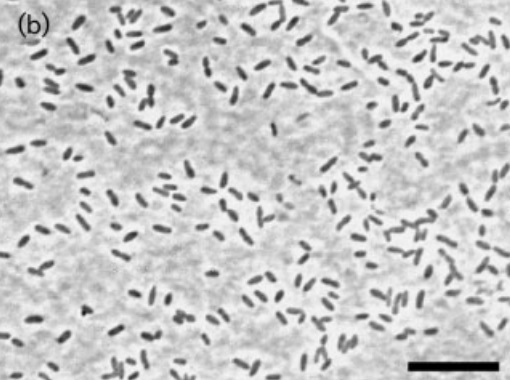
image of Edaphobacter aggregans

Edaphobacter aggregans is a Gram-negative, rod shaped bacterium from the genus Edaphobacter.
