= Telmatobacter =

Scientific classification
- Domain: Bacteria
- Kingdom: Pseudomonadati
- Phylum: Acidobacteriota
- Class: "Acidobacteriia"
- Order: Acidobacteriales
- Family: Acidobacteriaceae
- Genus: Telmatobacter; Pankratov & Dedysh, 2012

Type species
- Telmatobacter bradus Pankratov & Dedysh 2012

Species
- T. bradus

Genus of bacteria

Telmatobacter is a genus of bacteria in the family Acidobacteriaceae.

== History ==
Telmatobacter was first described in 2012. The name derives from the Greek noun telma–atos, meaning swamp or bog, and the noun bacter meaning short rod.

== Description ==
Telmatobacter is a genus of Gram-negative bacteria. They appear as motile, single rods. Telmatobacter reproduce by normal cell division and do not form spores. They are facultative anaerobes as well as chemo-organotrophs. They prefer to grow with sugars and pectin as growth substrates, although they are capable of fermenting sugars and several polysaccharides, including crystalline cellulose. They prefer acidic conditions and moderate temperatures, and they grow better on liquid medium than solid agar medium. Unlike some other bacteria, Telmatobacter do not produce hydrogen sulfide gas from thiosulfate, nor indole from tryptophan. Salt inhibits growth at concentrations above 0.1% (w/v). The DNA G+C content is 57.6%. Telmatobacter are found in acidic wetlands, specifically Sphagnum peat bogs. The only and type species is Telmatobacter bradus.

== See also ==
- List of bacterial orders
- List of bacteria genera
