= Koribacter versatilis =

Scientific classification (Candidatus)
- Domain: Bacteria
- Kingdom: Pseudomonadati
- Phylum: Acidobacteriota
- Class: "Acidobacteriia"
- Order: Acidobacteriales
- Family: Acidobacteriaceae
- Genus: Koribacter
- Species: K. versatilis

Binomial name
- Koribacter versatilis Ward et al. 2009

Species of bacterium

Koribacter versatilis is a member of the Acidobacteriota phylum which itself is a newly devised phylum of bacteria, and is only distantly related to other organisms in the domain bacteria. Its closest phylogenetic relative is "Candidatus Solibacter usitatus", according to Michael Nerdahl. It contains 5,650,368 nucleotides, 4,777 proteins, and 55 RNA genes, and has a circular chromosome according to information found from GenBank. According to the Joint Genome Institute, “The bacterium is a gram-negative, highly capsulated, aerobic heterotroph that grows with a range of sugars, sugar polymers, and some organic acids.”

It was first found in soil in a pasture from Australia in 2003, by a group of scientists led by S. J. Joseph. Although Koribacter has a very slow growth rate, sometimes taking up to a week to have a visible colony, it accounts for up to 14% of soil bacteria communities. The amount of Koribacter in soil is so abundant because iron is critical for its survival so with the large amount of iron in the soil it can thrive there.

Koribacter plays a large role in regulating Carbon monoxide output on Earth. From previous studies about bacteria it has been found that CO-oxidizing bacteria remove 20% of the total CO emitted to the Earth’s atmosphere. And because of that finding, “it is then plausible that acidobacteria, including Koribacter, make a quantitatively significant contribution to two major parts of the carbon cycle: degradation of complex polymers and CO oxidation”, according to Michael Nerdahl.
