= Bryocella elongata =

Scientific classification
- Domain: Bacteria
- Kingdom: Pseudomonadati
- Phylum: Acidobacteriota
- Class: "Acidobacteriia"
- Order: Acidobacteriales
- Family: Acidobacteriaceae
- Genus: Bryocella
- Species: B. elongata

Binomial name
- Bryocella elongata Dedysh et al. 2012

Species of bacterium

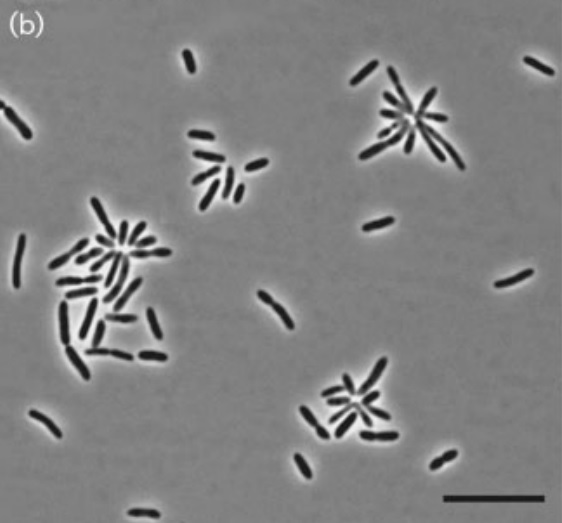
Bryocella elongata

Bryocella elongata is a bacterium, a type species of genus Bryocella. Cells are Gram-negative, non-motile pink-pigmented rods that multiply by normal cell division and form rosettes. The type strain is SN10(T). B. elongata was first isolated in 2011 from a methanotrophic enrichment culture.

== Phylogeny ==
According to analysis of 16S rRNA sequence, Bryocella elongata is a member of subdivision 1 of the phylum Acidobacteriota. Bryocella elongata SN10(T) forms a separate lineage within subdivision 1 of the Acidobacteriota and displays 94.0–95.4% 16S ribosomal RNA gene sequence similarity to members of the genera Edaphobacter and Granulicella, 93.0–93.7% similarity to members of the Terriglobus and 92.2–92.3% similarity to the type strains of Telmatobacter bradus and Acidobacterium capsulatum.

== Biology and biochemistry ==
Bryocella elongata is an aerobic chemo-organotroph. The growth substrates are sugars and heteropolysaccharides of plant and microbial origin (pectin, lichenan, fucoidan, gellan gum). Type strain Bryocella elongata SN10(T) was isolated from a methanotrophic enrichment culture obtained from an acidic Sphagnum peat. Bryocella elongata is not capable of growth on C(1) compounds, but it can develop in co-culture with exopolysaccharide-producing methanotrophs by utilization of their capsular material. Bryocella elongata is an acidophilic, mesophilic bacterium capable of growth at pH 3.2–6.6 (optimum at pH 4.7–5.2) and at 6–32 °C (optimum at 20–24 °C).
