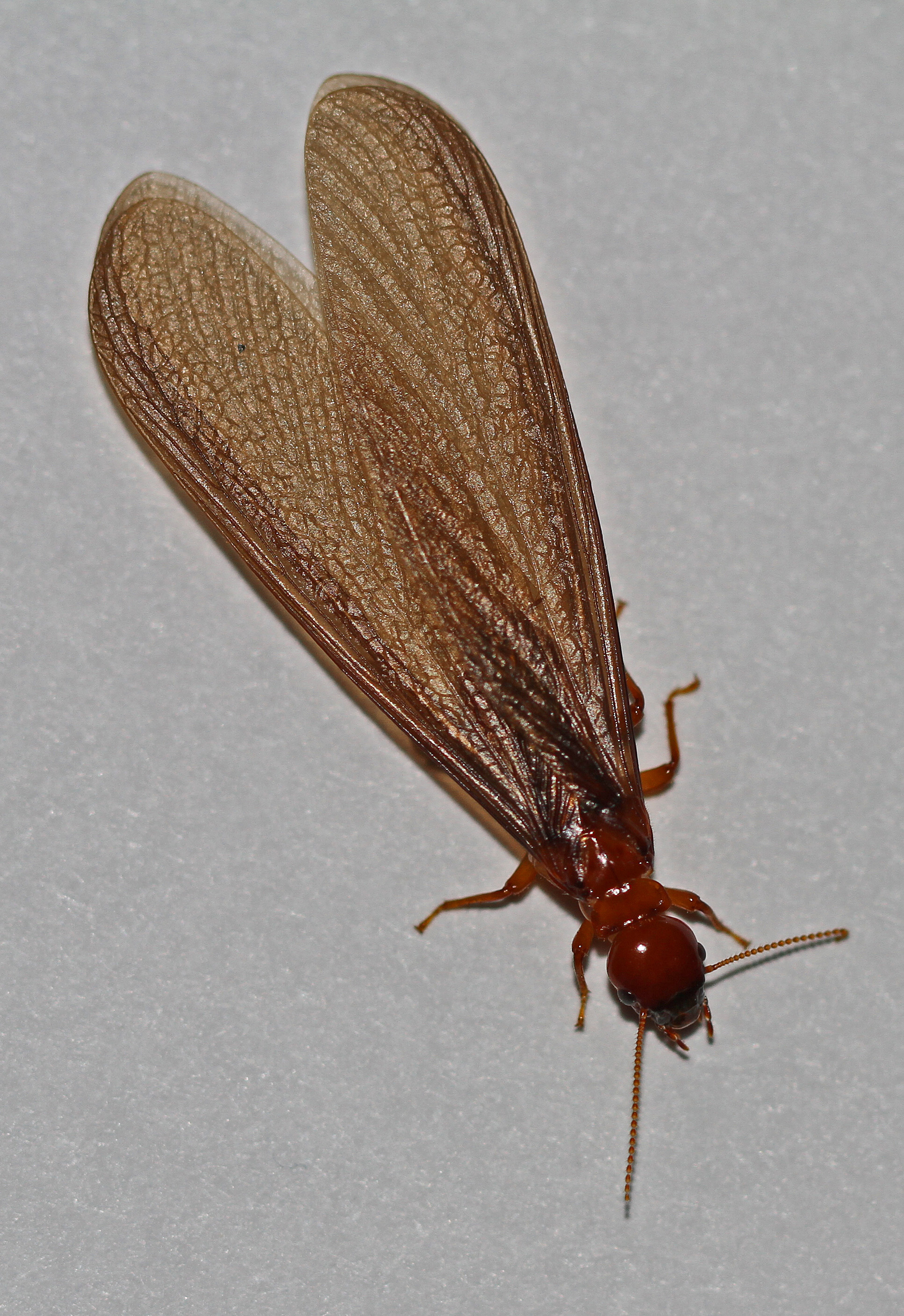
- Pacific Coast dampwood termite, Zootermopsis angusticollis, British Columbia

Scientific classification
- Kingdom: Animalia
- Phylum: Arthropoda
- Clade: Pancrustacea
- Class: Insecta
- Order: Blattodea
- Infraorder: Isoptera
- Family: Archotermopsidae
- Genus: Zootermopsis
- Species: Z. angusticollis

Binomial name
- Zootermopsis angusticollis Hagen, 1858

= Zootermopsis angusticollis =

Species of termite

Zootermopsis angusticollis is a species of termite (Order: Blattodea (formerly 'Isoptera)') in the family Archotermopsidae, a group known as the Pacific dampwood termites, or the rottenwood termites. As their name suggests, the dampwood termites can only survive by living off of wood that contains high amounts of moisture. They are found along the wet environments of the Pacific coast of North America. Most are found in the states of California, Oregon, Washington, Idaho, Western Nevada and in southern British Columbia. Termites are well known to be destroyers of wood, and although the dampwood termites can cause some damage, they are not as notoriously known to cause as much damage to buildings as the drywood termites. They occasionally have been carried to other parts of the country through wood shipments, but have not been able to become established in these areas due to undesirable environmental conditions.

== Identification ==
Zootermopsis angusticollis is a hemimetabolous, diploid species. Upon hatching from their egg, they are quite similar to adults except for their lack of genitalia. Their series of morphological instars allows them to increase in size until they reach their adult stage.

Like all other termites, the dampwood termites live in eusocial colonies that contain workers, soldiers, nymphs (semi-mature young), and both male and female reproductive individuals. When a colony is found, it is typically the nymphs that are observed. The winged individuals are light brown with dark brown leathery wings, whereas the nymphs are cream colored with a dark abdomen. The dampwood termites are some of the largest termites in North America.

An important sign for identifying dampwood termite infestations is their unique fecal pellets. They are approximately 1 mm in length and slightly hexagonal.

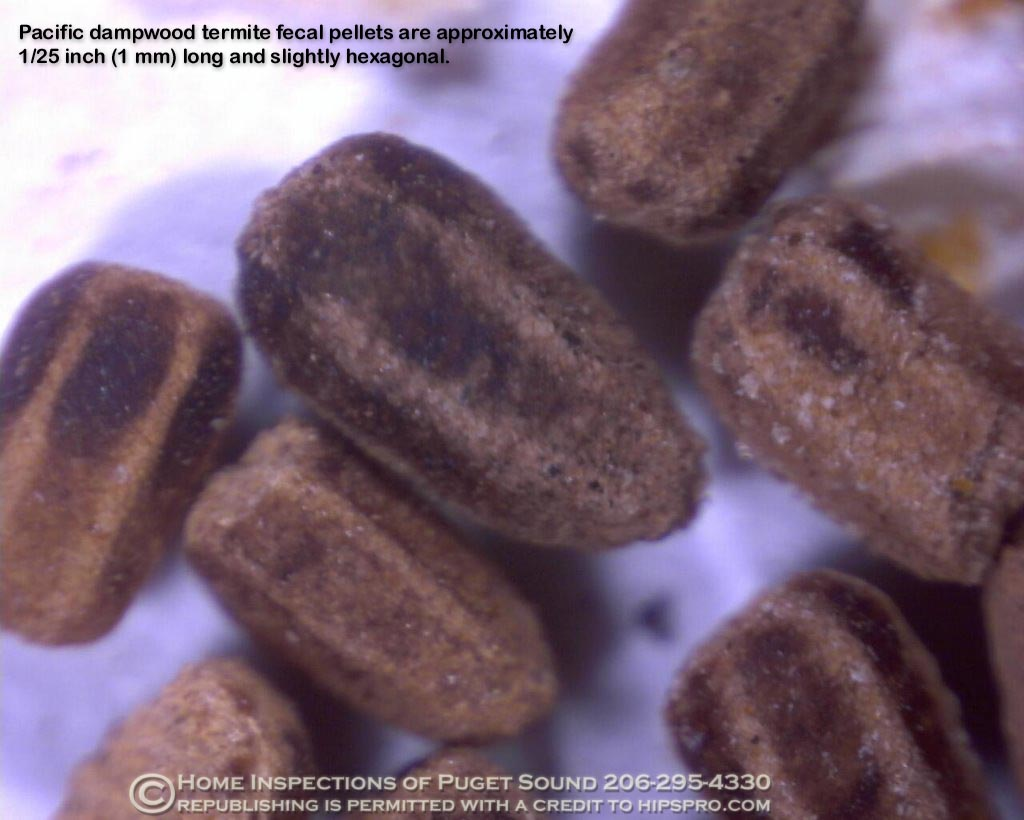
Fecal pellets

== Habitat ==
Unlike the more common drywood termites, the dampwood termites are very tolerant of wet conditions and build their colonies in damp wood such as rotting stumps and logs or other types of wood debris from coniferous trees. Individuals living within the colony will live the entirety of their life within the same piece of wood. They will never leave to forage, as the wood is also their food source. However, winged or alate females will leave on a mating flight in order to fulfill their primary role of the queen. Winged individuals are known to be great fliers and can reach distances of up to 350 meters. When the colony becomes too large for its habitat, it will swarm, however, this puts them at risk for exposure to pathogens and possible increased mortality. Swarms only contain about 50-60 individuals.

== Behavior ==
Members of the colony go through a series of polymorphic instars throughout their lifetime. Cannibalism is found within the termite species in order to rid the colony of dead or injured individuals that may disrupt movement. Individuals warn colony members by creating sounds through convulsive movements that move their body up and down to strike the floor and ceiling of the nest.

== Mating systems ==
Zootermopsis angusticollis are hemimetabolous, diploid insects. Once a male and female have selected one another during their mating flights, they proceed to occupy a hole which they will then seal. Mating takes place within two weeks. After a mated queen lays her eggs, about 15–20 days later, a colony is established. Approximately 12 eggs are laid at once. The queen, a mated female, is monogamous, and will lay her eggs in spurts followed by periods of inactivity. Egg production in termite queens is positively correlated with the size of the queen who then becomes wingless after her Nuptial flight. Termite queens are able to live for decades with the longest recorded length of 28.5 years. In relation to size, mature queens are on average larger than male kings, making them easier to identify within a colony. Within the colony, other female workers do not reproduce or mate as their ovaries become inactive in the presence of pheromones produced by the queen.

Unlike the eusocial order Hymenoptera, termite colonies inbreed which has been found to increase immunity to pathogens that may be exposed to the colony through introduction of outside members. Outbreeding studies performed with Z. angusticollis and colonies that are genetically dissimilar have resulted in higher mortality rates among the colony. Therefore, Z. angusticollis inbreeding and monogamous behaviors help them avoid outbreeding depression.

== Model species for hindgut ecology ==
Zootermopsis angusticolis are known to contain many different species of symbiont microbials within their hindgut that help to digest the wood they primarily consume. It can be argued that this species may be one of the best studied of the lower termites in terms of hindgut symbionts. The symbionts and the termite are thought to have co-evolved with one another. This specific species of termite has been studied for almost 100 years. Protists found within the termites hindgut include many species from the genus Trichonympha such as : Hexmastix temopsidis, Tricercomitus termopsidis, Trichomitopsis termopsidis, Trichonypha campanula, Trichonympha collaris, Trichonympha sphaerica and Streblomastis strix.
