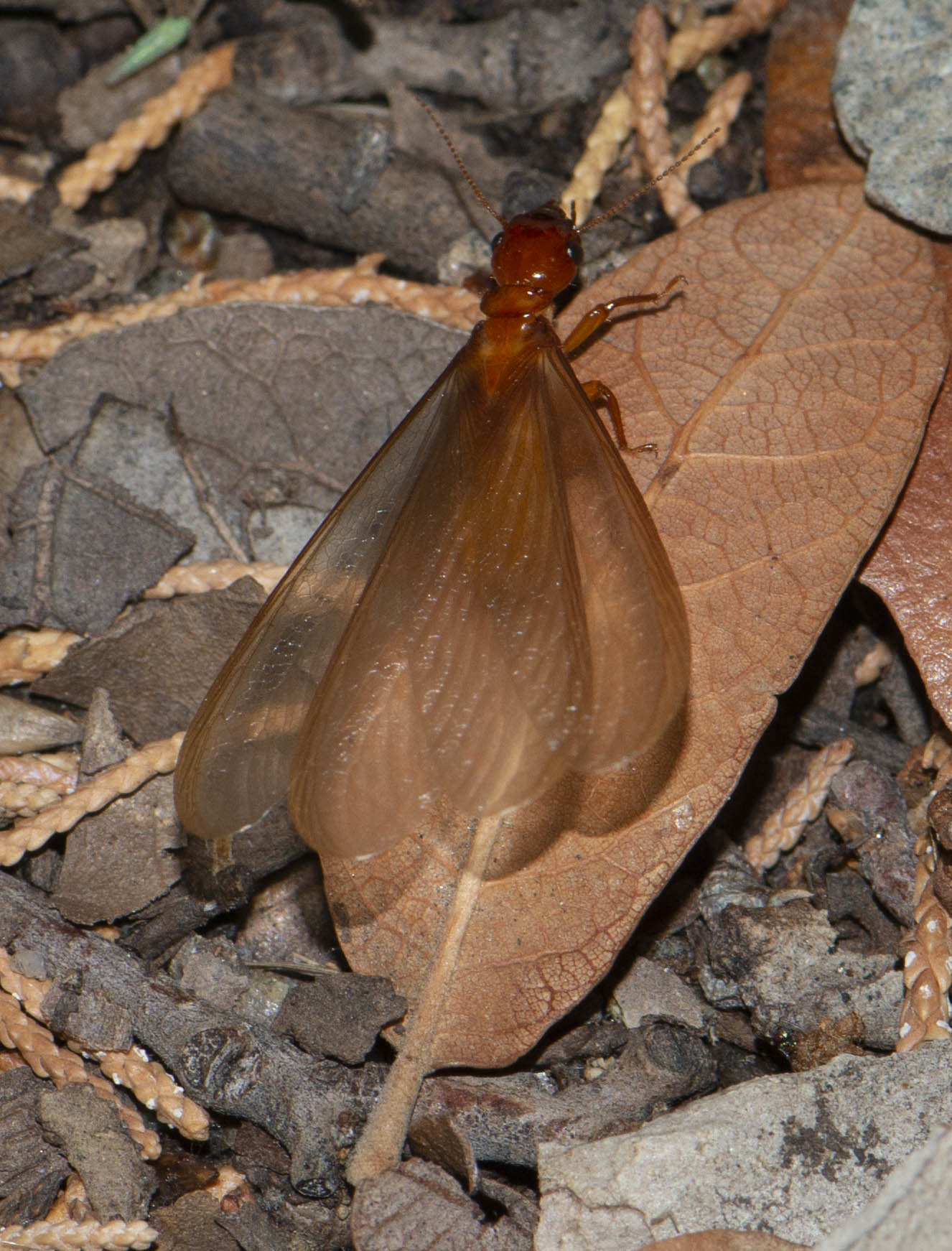

Scientific classification
- Kingdom: Animalia
- Phylum: Arthropoda
- Class: Insecta
- Order: Blattodea
- Infraorder: Isoptera
- Family: Archotermopsidae
- Genus: Zootermopsis
- Species: Z. laticeps

Binomial name
- Zootermopsis laticeps (Banks, 1906)

= Zootermopsis laticeps =

Species of termite

Zootermopsis laticeps, known generally as Arizona dampwood termite, is a species of termite in the family Archotermopsidae. Other common names include the wide-headed rottenwood termite and southwestern rottenwood termite. It is found in arid parts of south-western North America.

Species of Zootermopsis are difficult to tell apart; one means of doing so is by analysis of the cuticle hydrocarbons, but that method has its limitations, and it transpires that near-infrared spectroscopy can separate species and subspecies with an accuracy of over 99%.

== Distribution and habitat ==
Zootermopsis laticeps occurs in North America, its range extending from Arizona and New Mexico to northern Mexico. The termites live in rotting wood, in standing trees in riparian locations; the moisture present in the standing trees may be critical to their survival, as they are not found in fallen logs or tree stumps. Host trees include Populus, Salix and Platanus.

== Life cycle ==
A colony is usually founded by a winged male and female termite after a nuptial flight. Having discarded their wings, the reproductives choose a suitable tree with an area of dead wood and create a chamber under the bark, often entering through a beetle hole. The first egg develops into a small soldier termite, recognisable by its dark head and slashing mandibles; soldiers protect the colony from other termites and from marauding ants. The next eggs develop into workers, which expand the colony by chewing into the wood that surrounds them. When the dead wood is exhausted, the colony will die out.

As they continue to grow and moult, some of the workers may develop into full-sized soldiers, while others may begin to grow wingbuds, finally differentiating into primary reproductives; these become more numerous when the colony's resources are nearly depleted. Another group of workers may develop into golden-coloured wingless, secondary reproductives; this normally happens after the death of the primary reproductives, perhaps through strife with neighbouring colonies which often results in the two colonies merging. Merged colonies may contain numerous secondary reproductives.

== Ecology ==
The diet consists primarily of rotten wood, with symbiotic bacteria and protozoa present in the gut helping them to digest the cellulose. They will also consume injured members of their colony, and opportunistically, termites from other colonies.
