= Acidicapsa ferrireducens =

Scientific classification
- Domain: Bacteria
- Kingdom: Pseudomonadati
- Phylum: Acidobacteriota
- Class: "Acidobacteriia"
- Order: Acidobacteriales
- Family: Acidobacteriaceae
- Genus: Acidicapsa
- Species: A. ferrireducens

Binomial name
- Acidicapsa ferrireducens Falagán et al. 2017

Species of bacterium

Acidicapsa ferrireducens is a species of bacterium originally isolated from metal-rich acidic waters.
