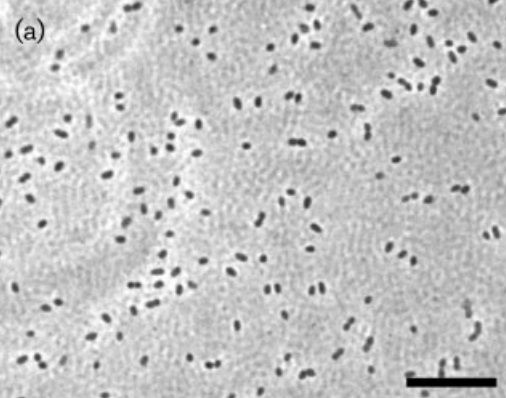

Scientific classification
- Domain: Bacteria
- Kingdom: Pseudomonadati
- Phylum: Acidobacteriota
- Class: "Acidobacteriia"
- Order: Acidobacteriales
- Family: Acidobacteriaceae
- Genus: Edaphobacter
- Species: E. modestus

Binomial name
- Edaphobacter modestus Koch et al. 2008

= Edaphobacter modestus =

Species of bacterium

Edaphobacter modestus is a species of bacteria. It is the type species of the genus Edaphobacter and was originally isolated from an alpine soil sample rich in calcium carbonate.
