= Acidicapsa acidiphila =

Scientific classification
- Domain: Bacteria
- Kingdom: Pseudomonadati
- Phylum: Acidobacteriota
- Class: "Acidobacteriia"
- Order: Acidobacteriales
- Family: Acidobacteriaceae
- Genus: Acidicapsa
- Species: A. acidiphila

Binomial name
- Acidicapsa acidiphila Falagán et al. 2017

Type strain
- MCF14, DSM 29819, NCCB 100576, MCF10

Species of bacterium

Acidicapsa acidiphila is a mesophilic and moderately acidophilic bacterium from the genus of Acidicapsa which has been isolated from acidic water in Cueva de la Mora (cave of the mulberry) in Spain.
