= Bryocella =

Scientific classification
- Domain: Bacteria
- Kingdom: Pseudomonadati
- Phylum: Acidobacteriota
- Class: "Acidobacteriia"
- Order: Acidobacteriales
- Family: Acidobacteriaceae
- Genus: Bryocella; Dedysh et al. 2012

Type species
- Bryocella elongata Dedysh et al. 2012

Species
- B. elongata

Genus of bacteria

Bryocella (Bry.o.cell’a. Gr. neut. n.; "bryon" - peat L. fem. n.; "cella" - cell N.L. fem. n.; "Bryocella" - peat-associated cell) is a genus of Gram-negative, non-spore forming, aerobic, rod-shaped bacteria from the family Acidobacteriaceae within subdivision 1 of the phylum Acidobacteriota. The type species of the genus is Bryocella elongata.

== See also ==
- List of bacterial orders
- List of bacteria genera
