= Acidipila =

Scientific classification
- Domain: Bacteria
- Kingdom: Pseudomonadati
- Phylum: Acidobacteriota
- Class: "Acidobacteriia"
- Order: Acidobacteriales
- Family: Acidobacteriaceae
- Genus: Acidipila; Okamura et al. 2015

Type species
- Acidipila rosea Okamura et al. 2015

Species
- A. dinghuensis; A. rosea

Genus of bacteria

Acidipila is a bacterial genus from the family of Acidobacteriaceae. All reported examples have been isolated from acidic substrates and are capable of growth on sugars

== See also ==
- List of bacterial orders
- List of bacteria genera
