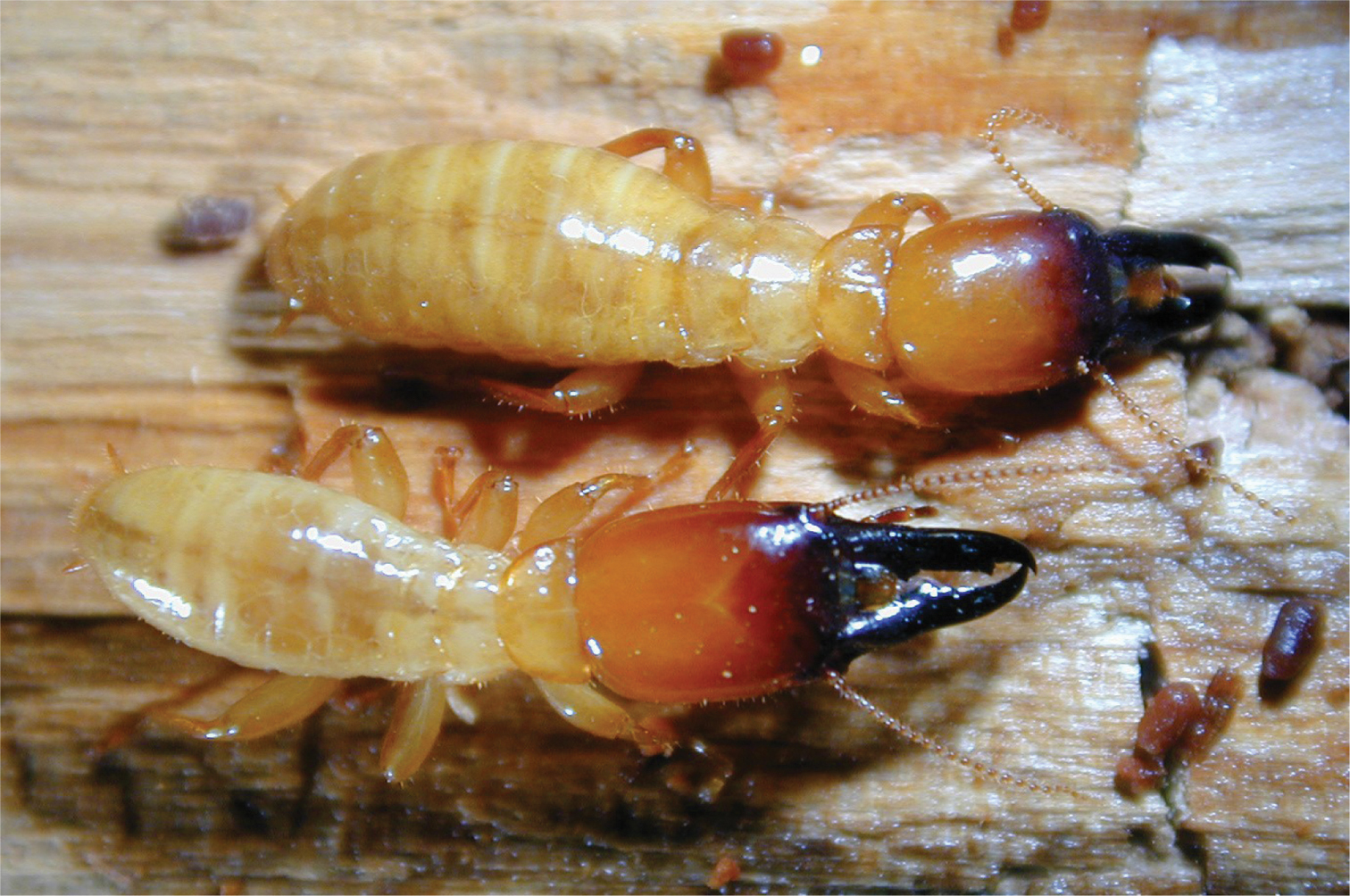
- Male reproductive soldier (top) and male soldier (bottom) of Z. n. nevadensis

Scientific classification
- Kingdom: Animalia
- Phylum: Arthropoda
- Clade: Pancrustacea
- Class: Insecta
- Order: Blattodea
- Infraorder: Isoptera
- Family: Archotermopsidae
- Genus: Zootermopsis
- Species: Z. nevadensis

Binomial name
- Zootermopsis nevadensis Hagen, 1858

= Zootermopsis nevadensis =

Species of termite

Zootermopsis nevadensis, the Nevada termite or Nevada dampwood termite, is a eusocial species of termite (Isoptera) in the family Archotermopsidae, a group known as the dampwood termites. It is a hemimetabolous organism.

== Subspecies ==
Zootermopsis nevadensis is subdivided into two subspecies, Z. n. nevadensis and Z. n. nuttingi. It is the genome of Zootermopsis nevadensis nuttingi that has been sequenced.

== Range ==
The Nevada termite lives in central and central-east California, and in central-west Nevada.

=== Habitat ===
The Nevada termite lives in deserts, grasslands, prairies, and rural areas.

== Predators ==
The Nevada termite is preyed on by passerine birds, shrews, spiders, lizards, salamanders, frogs, and toads.

== Genome ==
The main objective of sequencing Zootermopsis nevadensis genome was to find molecular traces of eusociality. The authors compared the whole sequenced and assembled genome and 25 transcriptomes from different development states and castes with the already sequenced genomes of eusocial Hymenoptera and ants.

This termite only has two opsin genes copies, the smallest number of opsin genes known among the insects, as a result of living in the dark for tens of millions of years.

=== Male fertility ===
Among gene families with a significant expansion, four of them exhibit overexpression on fertile males and they are linked to male spermatogenesis or cellular division: Kelch-like proteins 10 (KLHL10) and Seven-in-abstenia (SINA). The codified proteins are associated with E3-ubiquitine-ligase complex implicated in espermatide proteins degradation. There are other gene families which are not expanded but shows a differential expression pattern among developmental stages and castes. Collectively, the data suggest an expanded role around spermatogenesis regulation and termite evolution.

Male termites complete gamete maturation after their moult. Male Z. nevadensis mate repeatedly during the mature stage and need to increase sperm production. Moreover, males activate and deactivate their testes cyclically.

=== Chemoperception ===
Zootermopsis nevadensis shows expansion on genes implied in chemical communication, a crucial component in insects societies. It has approximately 280 functional chemoreceptor genes. This number is over the average of insects, but intermediate among ants or bees. Although the total number of genes is comparable, its distribution within different gene families diverge from what has been observed in Hymenoptera.

- The olfactive receptors (ORs) confers most of the specificity and sensitivity of insect olfaction. These genes are pretty expanded on ants (344-400 genes) and bees (163 genes) but in Z. nevadensis there are only 63 genes.
- The gustative receptor (GRs) are similarly expanded in Z. nevadensis (87 genes) and other eusocial insects (10-97 genes).
- The ionotropic receptors (IRs) are implied in gustation and olfaction in Drosophila melanogaster and they are expanded in Z. nevadensis too with 137 genes.

The great difference between ORs and IRs gives an opportunity to study the organization of the olfactive lobe. The antennal lobe is formed by glomeruli. The glomeruli are tightly packed and they are composed by terminal axons projected from receptor neurons to the antennae. The sensor neurons which express the same chemoreceptors extend their axons to the same glomeruli. Z. nevadensis only has 72 glomeruli, the majority of them are joined to the 63 ORs. As a result, only a few number of IRs and GRs are implied in olfaction, the rest may be implied in gustation. The termite Z. nevadensis has a limited ability to discriminate odours. The majority of the termites live their lives within a single log. A colony rarely meet other termites outside the log. In the other hand eusocial insects like bees has a developed sense of smell. This feature provide bees a sophisticated weapon to identify their colony partners.

=== Immunity ===
Homogeneous populations living in high density are perfect targets for infections. This termite concretely lives in a pathogen-rich environment. The genome was analyzed in order to establish the relationship between eusociality and disease resistance. There were found all the vias related to immunity in Drosophila and other insects, including pattern recognition receptors, signaling pathways and regulatory genes.

- 6 Gram-negative binding proteins (GNBPs), more than in other insects. One of them is specific of insect and the rest are specific of termites. This feature means that this kind of genes were expanded early within the evolution of this species.
- 5 signaling pathway genes related to immune system are overexpressed in reproductive females.
- 3 antimicrobian peptides (AMPs) (attacin, dipericine and a termicine orthologue). It was unexpected because the ant response against living in a pathogen rich environment is the expansion of AMPs.

Pathogens play an important role in eusocial insects, but the mechanisms improved to combat them differs in a taxon-specific manner.

=== Reproductive division of labor ===
The differentiation in castes and the reproductive division of labor is a marker of insect eusociality. Within Hymenoptera it has been proposed some regulators including vitelogenines (Vgs), juvenile hormone (JH), biogenic amines and other regulator like juvenile hormone binding proteins and some signaling pathways like insulin/insulin growth factor and yellow/major royal jelly protein like genes. The main genes involved in the reproductive division of labor are:

- Vitellogenines (Vgs) are precursors of the egg yolk protein vitellin. These proteins have been found outside egg production and they were implied in the regulation of caste differentiation in Apis mellifera. There were identified four Vgs. Two of them seem to be recent tandem duplications pretty conserved. One of these duplications is closely related to Neofem3 a specific gene implied in reproduction in other termite species. Three of the Four Vgs are significantly expressed in reproductive queens. One of the Vgs genes is moderately expressed in nymphs and non-reproductive workers. Vgs seem to have acquired a role in the regulation of caste behaviour. Overexpression of Vgs plays an important role as antioxidant and this feature could participate in reproductive females' longevity.
- Juvenile hormones (JHs) are involved in insect development, reproduction, longevity and both solitary and social behaviour. In termites it is well known that JHs module caste differentiation and adult gonadal activity. JHs have different functions among development stages and a lot of different functions within a development stage. In Z. nevadensis there was found all the enzymes of the JHIII biosynthetic pathway and major regulators such as JH-binding proteins impact caste differentiation.

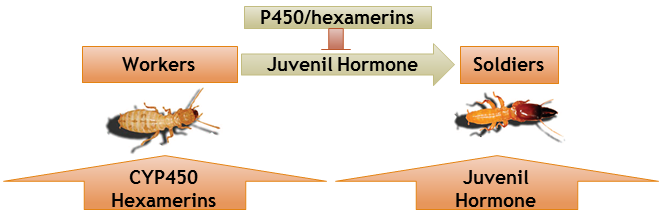
Caste differentiation scheme

The reproductive division of labor is associated with an increased longevity of reproductives and histone-modifying enzymes take part in lifespan regulation. There was found two histone-deacetylases overexpressed in reproductive females, sirtuin 6 and sirtuin 7.

In eusocial insects and the reproductive division of labor is regulated by cuticular hydrocarbons. The reproductive status in Z. nevadensis is directed by the abundance of four long chain polyunsaturated alkenes. From 16 elongases and 10 desaturases found in Z. nevadensis one of each group is highly expressed in reproductive forms. The reproductive co-expression of these genes makes them hydrocarbon signaling regulators candidates in Z. nevadensis.

Previous studies indicated that cytochromes P450 (CYP450) and hexamerins are implicated in caste differentiation.

- Cytochromes P450 are haeme-thiolate enzymes. In insects they contribute in endogenous and xenobiotics compound degradation. CYP4 and CYP5 families are implied in JH synthesis and degradation. CYP450 is involved with the JH-dependent differentiation from worker to soldier termites. There were found 55 CYP450 genes. This number is lower than in solitary Diptera, but intermediate compared with eusocial Hymenoptera.
- Hexamerins are usually storage proteins in solitary insects. There were found 5 hexamerin genes in Z. nevadensis. Two of them are implicated in JH availability. Hexamerins reduce the JH availability in workers and nymphal stages. The overexpression during this plastic stages inhibits the differentiation to soldiers.
