= Acidobacterium capsulatum =

Scientific classification
- Domain: Bacteria
- Kingdom: Pseudomonadati
- Phylum: Acidobacteriota
- Class: "Acidobacteriia"
- Order: Acidobacteriales
- Family: Acidobacteriaceae
- Genus: Acidobacterium
- Species: A. capsulatum

Binomial name
- Acidobacterium capsulatum Kishimoto et al. 1991

Species of bacterium

Acidobacterium capsulatum is a bacterium. It is an acidophilic chemoorganotrophic bacterium containing menaquinone. It is gram-negative, facultative anaerobic, mesophilic, non-spore-forming, capsulated, saccharolytic and rod-shaped. It is also motile by peritrichous flagella. Its type strain is JCM 7670.

They can grow between pH 3.0 and 6.0, but not at pH 6.5. They give positive results in esculin hydrolysis, β-galactosidase and catalase tests and are negative in oxidase and urease tests. They can use glucose, starch, cellobiose, maltose as a sole carbon source, but cannot use elemental sulfur and ferrous iron as an energy source. Another characteristic of this organism is the presence of high amounts of exopolysaccharides coating the cells from soil isolates. Presence of exopolysaccharides helps in increased adhesion and allow the bacterium to acquire nutrients more readily from the environment.

== Ecology ==
A. capsulatum are widely distributed in both aquatic and terrestrial environments, though they were first isolated from acidic drainage. Studies based on rRNA genes revealed that they are present in the soils, sediments, wetlands and wastewater systems. Due to their ubiquity and abundance in various ecosystems, they play an important role in biogeochemical processes. A. capsulatum have also been reported to dominate soils rich in organic matter and are involved in microbial degradation of lignocellulosic plant biomass.

They are frequent and sometimes dominant in iron-rich environments such as abandoned mines, and can play a significant role in iron-cycling.

== Genome Features ==
A. capsulatum has a relatively small genome size of 4,127,496 base pairs and plasmids were not identified. Integrated prophages were found in the genome of A. capsulatum. and full complements of flagellar and chemotaxis genes were also identified. Single protein phylogenies from all the proteins encoded by the genome support the acidobacterial-proteobacterial relationship; moreover A. capsulatum proteins are most closely related to proteobacterial equivalents than to those from any other phylum. The genome encodes the ability to degrade a variety of sugars, amino acids, alcohols and metabolic intermediates and also can use complex substrates such as xylan, hemicelluloses, pectin, starch and chitin.

A. capsulatum contains a large number of glycoside hydrolase-encoding genes and genes that encode plant cell wall-degrading enzymes, with a particularly large cluster that encodes pectin degradation. These suggest an important role for carbohydrates in nutritional pathways, as well as in desiccation resistance. The polymer degrading properties reveal acidobacteria as decomposers in the soil that potentially participate in the cycling of plant, fungal and insect derived organic matters. Studies also suggested further flexibility and novelty in their ability to metabolize carbon.

Genomic evidences suggested the role of A.capsulatum in nitrogen cycling in soils and sediments by the reduction of nitrate, nitrite and possibly nitric oxide. Assimilatory nitrate reductase gene sequences are most similar to those described for the cyanobacteria.

== Metabolism ==
A. capsulatum are facultative anaerobes, though they were previously described to be aerobic when they were first discovered. Later studies reported its ability to grow slowly under micro-oxic and anoxic conditions. Under reduced oxygen tension, optimum growth was observed on pectin, raffinose, rhamnose, sucrose, xylose, maltose, melibiose and galactose.whereas carboxylic acids and most alcohols were not utilised. Anaerobic growth occurred by means of fermenting sugars and polysaccharides. The product of cellulose degradation under anoxic conditions are acetate and hydrogen. Bacterial cellulose biofilm is hypothesised to be able to promote and facilitate adherence to ferric iron substrate, which can be useful to nutrient starved environments. A facultatively anaerobic lifestyle allows this bacterium to thrive at the oxic or anoxic interface of freshwater wetlands.

There is growing evidence that A. capsulatum plays an important role in iron redox reactions. The ability to scavenge iron is critical for survival in soils. A. capsulatum contains gene that enable to take up iron from the environment, which encode a high-affinity ferrous iron transporter.

Polyketide synthase (PKS) and nonribosomal peptide synthase (NRPS) enzymes are known for their roles in the synthesis of siderophores, as well as other natural products such as antibiotics, antifungals, antivirals, antitumor agents and anti nematodal agents. The A. capsulatum genome contains three clustered genes that encode NRPs, several genes that encode PKSs, and one hybrid NRPS-PKS gene.

A.capsulatum contains gene that encode putative addiction modules, consisting of toxin and anti-toxin pairs. The addiction modules operates rapidly to inhibit the synthesis of DNA and protein in response to stress or starvation.

== Plant-microbe interaction ==
A. capsulatum are dominant in the rhizosphere soil and abundant during plant development, and it is possibly due to changes in plant exudation. Root length, lateral root formation and root hair number were increased in plants exposed to A. capsulatum. Moreover, the root biomass increased significantly for plantlets inoculated with the bacterium. The improved root architecture, more lateral branches and higher number of root hairs assist in more efficient water and nutrient uptake in plants. increased shoot biomass was also observed. In addition, bacterial adhesion, biofilm formation and growth along the root surfaces were observed in the bacterium.

A. capsulatum is involved in soil matrix formation, water and nutrition trapping, and bacterial adhesion that lead to soil aggregate formation. The bacterium produce exopolysaccharides for adhesion to the root surfaces. A. capsulatum can has a positive effect on plant growth indirectly by acting as a biocontrol agent or directly by modulating plant hormone levels and by facilitating resource acquisition, mostly nitrogen, phosphorus and iron. A recent study tested the production of the auxin indole 3 acetic acid by the bacterium and they verified that a possible auxin production is involved in plant growth promotion.
