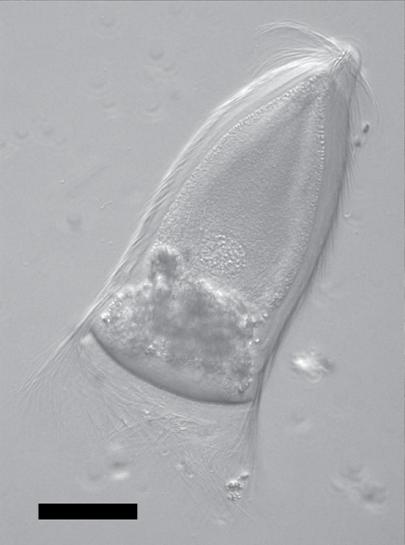
- Trichonympha campanula

Scientific classification
- Domain: Eukaryota
- Phylum: Metamonada
- Order: Trichonymphida
- Family: Trichonymphidae
- Genus: Trichonympha; Leidy, 1877

Type species
- Trichonympha agilis Leidy, 1877

Synonyms
- Leidyopsis Kofoid & Swezy, 1919

= Trichonympha =

Genus of flagellated protists

Trichonympha is a genus of single-celled, anaerobic parabasalids of the order Hypermastigia that is found exclusively in the hindgut of lower termites and wood roaches. Trichonympha's bell shape and thousands of flagella make it an easily recognizable cell. The symbiosis between lower termites/wood roaches and Trichonympha is highly beneficial to both parties: Trichonympha helps its host digest cellulose and in return receives a constant supply of food and shelter. Trichonympha also has a variety of bacterial symbionts that are involved in sugar metabolism and nitrogen fixation.

== Etymology ==
The word Trichonympha is a compound of the New Latin word 'tricho' and the word 'nympha'. 'Tricho' in its simplest form refers to hair, and in this case makes reference to the many flagella of Trichonympha. The ending 'nympha' was chosen by Joseph Leidy in 1877 when he first observed Trichonympha because their flagella reminded him of nymphs from a "spectacular drama" he had recently enjoyed

== History ==
Trichonympha was first described in 1877 by Joseph Leidy. He described the species Trichonympha agilis in the termite genus Reticulitermes, though at the time he was unaware that multiple species of Trichonympha exist. While fascinated by the unique morphology of Trichonympha, Leidy was unable to place Trichonympha in a group due to the now-outdated technology of the time. He determined that Trichonympha was either a ciliate, a gregarine or a turbellarian, all of which turned out to be incorrect.

Since Leidy discovered Trichonympha in 1877, the genus has been studied extensively. In the 1930s to 1960s Lemuel Cleveland dedicated a large part of his career to studying the inhabitants of wood roach and lower termite hindguts, including Trichonympha. A large part of what we know about Trichonympha today stems from the research done by Cleveland. He focused mainly on what happens to hindgut symbionts when their host molts, which directly impacts the lifecycle of Trichonympha. The sexual cycle of Trichonympha was first described by Cleveland.

In 2008 the SSU rRNA of many termite hindgut symbionts was sequenced, including that of Trichonympha, allowing the phylogenetic relationship between many genera to be determined.

Today, the hindgut symbionts of termites and wood roaches are still being studied in various labs. There is still much to be discovered about the interactions between endosymbionts and their hosts, and how these interactions shape the social behaviour of termites and wood roaches.

== Habitat and ecology ==
Trichonympha lives in a very specific habitat: the hindgut of lower termites and wood roaches. In this relationship, Trichonympha is referred to as an endosymbiont. However, Trichonympha is also a host to bacterial symbionts. Both as an endosymbiont and as a host, Trichonympha plays an important biological role in its habitat.

=== As an endosymbiont ===
Trichonympha is found as an endosymbiont in four families of lower termites (Archotermopsidae, Rhinotermitidae, Kalotermitidae, and Hodotermitidae) and in the wood roach, Cryptocercus. It is thought that the common ancestor of lower termites and wood roaches, Isoptera, acquired Trichonympha.

Trichonympha is a vital part of the hindgut microbiota of these organisms. Lower termites and wood roaches have a diet composed almost exclusively of wood and wood-related items, such as leaf litter, and therefore, need to digest large quantities of cellulose, lignocellulose and hemicellulose. However, they do not have the enzymes necessary to do this. Trichonympha and other endosymbionts in the hindgut of these organisms help with the digestion of wood related particles. These flagellate protists, including Trichonympha, convert cellulose into sugar using glycoside hydrolases. The sugar is then converted into acetate, hydrogen and carbon dioxide via oxidation. Acetate is the main energy source for lower termites and wood roaches, so without the activity of Trichonympha, its host would not be able to survive. Higher termites likely do not have flagellates, such as Trichonympha, in their hindgut because they have diversified their diet to include food sources other than wood.

The large quantities of hydrogen produced while sugar is converted into the energy for the host's use causes the hindgut of lower termites and wood roaches to be highly anoxic. This creates a very hospitable environment for Trichonympha as it is anaerobic. In fact, the relationship between Trichonympha and its host is not only highly beneficial for the host, but for Trichonympha as well. In exchange for helping the host digest its food, Trichonympha receives an anaerobic environment to live in, a constant source of food and continuous shelter and protection.

The gut of a termite or wood roach is an active place with many moving parts. This is why Trichonympha has a large complement of flagella; the beating of the flagella helps Trichonympha hold its place in the gut. However, the hindgut of the host is not always hospitable. Both lower termites and wood roaches molt regularly. During the molting process, lower termites and wood roaches replace their chitinous exoskeleton as well as the cuticle that lines their gut. This means that with each molt Trichonympha is expelled from the gut. The Trichonympha in lower termites do not survive this process, but the ones in wood roaches are able to survive by encysting. The hosts thus have to replenish their gut microbiota after every molt. This is accomplished by proctodeal trophallaxis, where nestmates eat each other's hindgut fluid to acquire endosymbionts. They do not eat hindgut fluid that was excreted during the molting process of another lower termite/wood roach, as the endosymbionts in this fluid are already dead. Instead the hindgut fluid of a nestmate that has not recently molted is consumed. This process ensures a reliable transfer of Trichonympha across generations.

Termites and wood roaches play a vital role in the Earth's ecosystems. They are sometimes even known as "ecosystem engineers". Their consumption and degradation of wood and wood related foods has a major impact on the carbon cycle. Unfortunately, the wood eating of termites and wood roaches also has a negative impact. Termites are known to be ubiquitous pests that can destroy vast amounts of agriculture and forestry. As this would not be possible without Trichonympha, Trichonympha therefore also has a profound impact on the carbon cycle and contributes to the abundance of termite pests around the world.

=== As a host ===
While Trichonympha has been found to be capable of metabolizing cellulose without any bacterial symbionts, it still needs a wide variety of bacterial ectosymbionts and endosymbionts to survive. It has been found that Trichonympha and various endosymbiotic bacteria may be evolving together (cospeciating), suggesting that the symbiosis is a vital part of both the bacterial and Trichonympha cell's success. The exact composition and function of Trichonympha's symbionts is still being investigated.

==== Endosymbionts ====
Common bacterial endosymbionts of Trichonympha belong in the class Endomicrobia. They are generally found in the cytoplasm of Trichonympha and are thought to be involved in a nitrogen fixing process. This is vital to the success of Trichonympha, as the diet of lower termites and wood roaches lack readily usable nitrogen. Studies have shown that each Trichonympha cell only contains one phylotype of Endomicrobia. This suggests cospeciation between Trichonympha and Endomicrobia by vertical inheritance. New daughter cells most likely inherit their parent cells' Endomicrobia during cell division. This causes a lineage of Endomicrobia to be established and maintained in Trichonympha. It has also been found that the Endomicrobia found in Trichonympha are monophyletic, suggesting that Endomicrobia only entered into symbiosis with Trichonympha once. Since Endomicrobia are not present in all species of Trichonympha, there are two hypotheses for when this symbiosis arose. One hypothesis suggests that Endomicrobia were present in the common ancestor of all Trichonympha and then lost in some lineages. The other, simpler, explanation suggests that Endomicrobia were not present in the common ancestor of Trichonympha, and entered into symbiosis after separate Trichonympha lineages were already established.

Other bacterial endosymbionts of Trichonympha are still being discovered and investigated. An example of such an endosymbiont is Candidatus Desulfovibrio trichonymphae, which was discovered to be an endosymbiont of Trichonympha agilis in 2009. Desulfovibrio had previously been localized to the hindgut of lower termites, but it was not known that it is an endosymbiont of Trichonympha. Desulfovibrio are coccoid and rod-shaped cells, that are found in the cortical layer of Trichonympha. Their function in Trichonympha may be to take sugars from Trichonympha's cytoplasm and convert them into acetate, hydrogen and ethanol. They are also thought to be involved in a sulfate reducing process.

==== Ectosymbionts ====
Trichonympha has a variety of ectosymbionts. Some of the most common bacterial ectosymbionts are spirochetes, of the order Bacteroidales. They are found on a variety of flagellate termite and wood roach endosymbionts, including Trichonympha, but also as free-living bacteria in the hindgut of lower termites. They are thought to be involved in a variety of processes including nitrogen fixation, acetogenesis and the degradation of lignin.

As previously mentioned, Endomicrobia are important endosymbionts of Trichonympha. However, it has recently been determined that they may also play a role as ectosymbionts. Endomicrobia attach to the cell membrane and flagella of Trichonympha via protrusions. They are not present on every Trichonympha individual, suggesting that this symbiosis is facultative, not obligatory.

== Description ==
=== Morphology ===
The morphology of Trichonympha has been studied since the 19th century. Trichonympha is a bell-shaped cell varying in width from 21 μm to 30 μm and in length from 90 to 110 μm.

The anterior tip of the cell is referred to as the rostrum and is composed of the outer and inner operculum. In some species the outer operculum has been observed to have elongated protrusions, referred to as frills. The outer operculum is filled with fluid to give it a cushioning effect, as the function of the outer and inner operculum is to protect the centrioles that lie directly beneath them. The centrioles are located in the rostral tube, which is an internal component of the cell, that leads to the rostrum. The rostral tube is made up of lamellae in a circular arrangement. Each cell has two centrioles, one long and one short, located beneath the inner cap, in the anterior end of the rostral tube. These centrioles have a fixed position in the cell and play an important role in asexual reproduction.

The entire cell is covered in thousands of flagella which arise from basal bodies. There are several patterns of how the flagella attach to the cell at the posterior end of the rostrum. In some species the flagella attach exclusively to the rostrum while in others the flagella attach to the rostrum, as well as adhering to each other. Another pattern of flagella adherence involves flagella emerging from flagellar folds, which are grooves that run parallel to the cell, and then attaching to each other.

Another key component of a Trichonympha cell is the basal body and parabasal fibres. Trichonympha has long basal bodies which give rise to the flagella. These basal bodies lie along the rostral tube and are made up of microtubules. The basal bodies are connected to a large Golgi complex via parabasal fibres. This large Golgi complex is often referred to as the parabasal body and originates anterior to the single nucleus, which it extends around.

Trichonympha do not have traditional mitochondria. Instead, they have highly reduced versions of mitochondria, called hydrogenosomes. A hydrogenosome is a membrane bound, redox active organelle. They produce hydrogen gas from the oxidation of pyruvate, and function in anaerobic environments.

=== Life cycle ===
Trichonympha live exclusively in lower termite or wood roach guts throughout all stages of their life cycle. Trichonympha cells have a zygotic meiosis life cycle, where the life stage that undergoes meiosis is the zygote. Therefore, the entire adult stage of Trichonympha is haploid. The life cycle stage of Trichonympha is largely coordinated with its host. The majority of the time, Trichonympha reproduces asexually. However, molting of the host has a significant impact on Trichonympha. In lower termites, Trichonympha dies when molting occurs, while in wood roaches Trichonympha encysts and then reproduces sexually. A common misconception about the molting process is that the Trichonympha cells die when they are shed with the hindgut of the lower termite or wood roach. This is incorrect, as the Trichonympha cells are generally dead or encysted up to six days before molting occurs. There are two hypotheses for why this may occur:

1. The gut environment becomes hostile as the lower termite or wood roach prepares to molt. The hostile factors include lack of food, the formation of oxygen bubbles and increased viscosity of the hindgut fluid.
2. Death/encystment is caused by changes in hormonal levels of the lower termite or wood roach.

==== Asexual reproduction ====
The majority of Trichonympha's reproduction is asexual via binary fission. First, the cell separates into two halves, starting at the rostrum. This causes an aflagellate region to be present on both daughter cells. The newly formed daughter cells then mass-produce cytoplasm to increase their size. Lastly, centrioles cause new flagella to be formed, as well as a new parabasal body.

==== Sexual reproduction ====
Sexual reproduction in Trichonympha occurs in three distinct phases: gametogenesis, fertilization and meiosis.

Gametogenesis occurs when gametes are produced by the division of a haploid cell that has encysted in response to the wood roach host molting. The nucleus and the cytoplasm of the haploid cell divide to produce two unequal gametes. The unequal division is caused by the production of unequal daughter chromosomes, each of which goes to a specific pole. One of the gametes, referred to by Cleveland as the "egg", develops a ring of fertilization granules at its posterior. These granules attract the other gamete. Inside the ring is a fertilization cone, which provides an entry point for the other gamete, referred to by Cleveland as the "sperm".

During fertilization the "sperm" enters the "egg" and their cytoplasms fuse to form a zygote The "sperm" loses all of its extranuclear organelles, such as its flagella, parabasal body and centrioles.

After fertilization the zygote undergoes meiosis. Meiosis I occurs a few hours after fertilization. During meiosis I the zygote's chromosomes duplicate and the zygote divides. During meiosis I, the centromeres are not duplicated. After meiosis I, meiosis II occurs, during which the centromeres, but not the chromosomes, are duplicated, and the cell divides again. The overall result of meiosis is four haploid cells.

== Fossil record ==
There is not a lot of fossil history pertaining to Trichonympha, but some fossils of termite gut symbionts have been found. The fossils of a kalotermitid termite provide evidence that the symbiosis between lower termites and Trichonympha already existed in the Mesozoic Era.

== List of species ==
- Trichonympha acuta
- Trichonympha agilis
- Trichonympha algoa
- Trichonympha campanula
- Trichonympha chula
- Trichonympha collaris
- Trichonympha deweyi sp.
- Trichonympha grandis
- Trichonympha hueyi sp.
- Trichonympha lata
- Trichonympha lighti
- Trichonympha louiei sp.
- Trichonympha magna
- Trichonympha okolona
- Trichonympha parva
- Trichonympha postcylindrica
- Trichonympha quasili
- Trichonympha saepiculae
- Trichonympha sphaerica
- Trichonympha tabogae
- Trichonympha webbyae sp.
