= Acidicapsa =

Scientific classification
- Domain: Bacteria
- Kingdom: Pseudomonadati
- Phylum: Acidobacteriota
- Class: "Acidobacteriia"
- Order: Acidobacteriales
- Family: Acidobacteriaceae
- Genus: Acidicapsa; Kulichevskaya et al. 2012

Type species
- Acidicapsa borealis Kulichevskaya et al. 2012

Species
- A. acidiphila; A. acidisoli; A. borealis; A. dinghuensis; A. ferrireducens; A. ligni

Genus of bacteria

Acidicapsa is a bacterial genus from the family of Acidobacteriaceae.

== Phylogeny ==
The currently accepted taxonomy is based on the List of Prokaryotic names with Standing in Nomenclature (LPSN) and National Center for Biotechnology Information (NCBI).

16S rRNA based LTP_10_2024

- Acidicapsa
  - A. acidisoli Matsuo et al. 2017
  - - A. dinghuensis Ou-yang, Xia & Qiu 2018
    - - - A. borealis Kulichevskaya et al. 2012
        - A. ligni Kulichevskaya et al. 2012
      - - A. acidiphila Falagán, Foesel & Johnson 2017
        - A. ferrireducens Falagán, Foesel & Johnson 2017

120 marker proteins based GTDB 10-RS226

- Acidicapsa
  - A. dinghuensis
  - - A. acidisoli
    - A. ligni

== See also ==
- List of bacterial orders
- List of bacteria genera
