= Termopsidae =

Scientific classification
- Kingdom: Animalia
- Phylum: Arthropoda
- Clade: Pancrustacea
- Class: Insecta
- Order: Blattodea
- Infraorder: Isoptera
- Parvorder: Euisoptera
- Family: †Termopsidae; Grassé, 1949

Genera
- see text

Extinct family of termites

Termopsidae is an extinct family of termites in the order Blattodea. The five extant genera formerly included in Termopsidae (Archotermopsis, Hodotermopsis, Porotermes, Stolotermes, and Zootermopsis) now belong in their own distinct families, leaving only extinct taxa in Termopsidae.

Several prehistoric genera are placed herein, known only from fossils. Since only a small part of the diversity of dampwood termites survives, it is rather difficult to assign these to subfamilies. Several seem to represent very ancient members of the family; they may be quite basal Termopsidae, so it is indeed unwarranted to place them into a subfamily at all.

== Genera ==
- Asiatermes Ren, 1995
  - Asiatermes reticulatus Ren, 1995 (Cretaceous, Aptian; Lushangfen Formation, China)
- Cretatermes Emerson, 1967
  - Cretatermes carpenteri Emerson, 1967 (Cretaceous, Cenomanian; Redmond Formation, Canada)
- Huaxiatermes Ren, 1995
  - Huaxiatermes huangi Ren, 1995 (Cretaceous, Aptian; Lushangfen Formation, China)
- Lutetiatermes Schlüter, 1989
  - Lutetiatermes priscus Schlüter, 1989 (Cretaceous, Cenomanian; Bezonnais amber, France)
- Mesotermopsis Engel & Ren, 2003
  - Mesotermopsis incompleta (Ren, 1995) (Cretaceous, Aptian; Lushangfen Formation, China)
  - Mesotermopsis lata (Ren, 1995) (Cretaceous, Aptian; Lushangfen Formation, China)
- Paleotermopsis
  - Paleotermopsis oligocenicus Nel & Paicheler, 1993 (Oligocene, Chattian; Niveau du gypse d'Aix Formation, France)
- Parotermes Scudder, 1883
  - Parotermes insignis Scudder, 1883 (Eocene, Priabonian; Florissant Formation, USA)
- Termopsis Heer, 1849
  - Termopsis bremii Heer, 1849 (Eocene, Priabonian; Baltic Amber, Europe)
  - Termopsis gracilipennis Theobald, 1937 (Oligocene, Rupelian; Salt Formation, Germany)
  - Termopsis mallaszi Pongrácz, 1928 (Miocene, Sarmatian; Tompa, Romania)
  - Termopsis transsylvanica Pongrácz, 1928 (Miocene, Sarmatian; Tompa, Romania)
  - Termopsis ukapirmasi Engel et al., 2007 (Eocene, Priabonian; Baltic Amber, Europe)
- Valditermes Jarzembowski, 1981 – provisionally placed here
  - Valditermes brenanae Jarzembowski, 1981 (Cretaceous, Hauterivian; Weald Clay, England)

== Nomenclature ==
The group was originally described as a subfamily, Termopsinae, by Nils Holmgren in 1911, and was raised to the taxonomic rank of family by Pierre-Paul Grassé in 1949.
