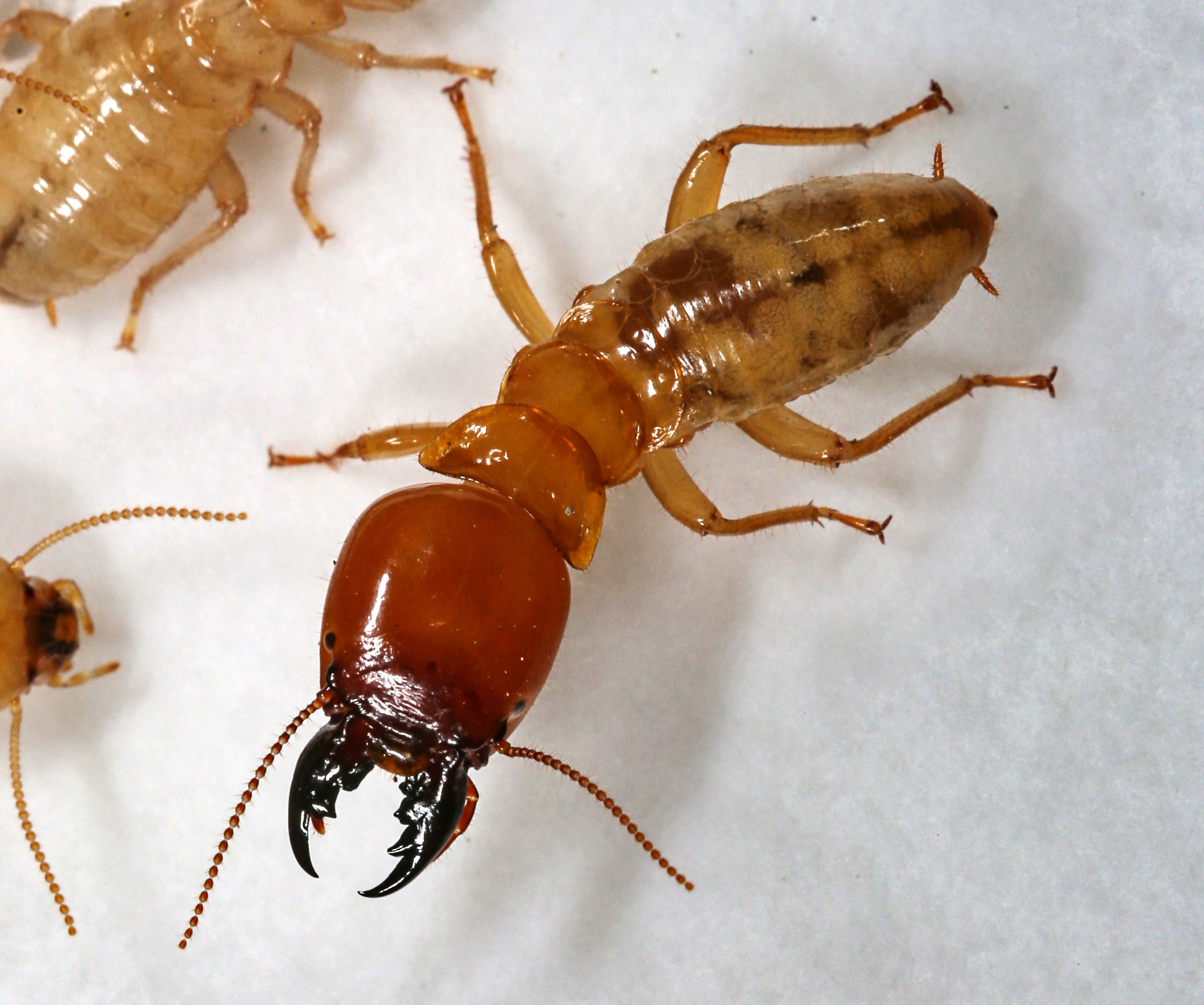
- Soldier of H. sjostedti

Scientific classification
- Kingdom: Animalia
- Phylum: Arthropoda
- Clade: Pancrustacea
- Class: Insecta
- Order: Blattodea
- Infraorder: Isoptera
- Family: Hodotermopsidae; Engel, 2021
- Genus: Hodotermopsis; Holmgren, 1911

= Hodotermopsis =

Genus of termites

Hodotermopsis is a genus of termites. It is the only genus in the family Hodotermopsidae, which was elevated from the subfamily Hodotermopsinae in 2022. It contains two extant species, H. sjostedti, H. japonica, and the fossil species H. iwatensis (Fujiyama, 1983). Hodotermopsidae together with Stolotermitidae, Hodotermitidae, and Archotermopsidae, form the monophyletic clade Teletisoptera under Euisoptera which is confirmed to be a sister group to Mastotermitidae.
