= Vicinamibacteraceae =

Scientific classification
- Domain: Bacteria
- Kingdom: Pseudomonadati
- Phylum: Acidobacteriota
- Class: Vicinamibacteria; Dedysh and Yilmaz 2018
- Order: Vicinamibacterales; Dedysh and Yilmaz 2018
- Family: Vicinamibacteraceae; Huber and Overmann 2018

Genera
- Luteitalea; Vicinamibacter

Family of bacteria

Vicinamibacteraceae is a family of bacteria in the phylum Acidobacteriota.

== Phylogeny ==
The currently accepted taxonomy is based on the List of Prokaryotic names with Standing in Nomenclature and National Center for Biotechnology Information (NCBI).

16S rRNA based phylogeny

- - Vicinamibacteriales Vicinamibacteriaceae
    - - Vicinamibacter Huber et al. 2016
      - Luteitalea Vieira et al. 2017
  - Order 8
    - Family 13
    - Family 16

16S rRNA based LTP_10_2024

- - Vicinamibacteriales Vicinamibacteriaceae
    - - Vicinamibacter
      - Luteitalea

120 marker proteins based GTDB 10-RS226

- - "Marinacidobacterales" "Marinacidobacteraceae"
    "Ca. Marinacidobacterium" Nguyen 2022
  - Vicinamibacteriales Vicinamibacteriaceae
    Luteitalea
