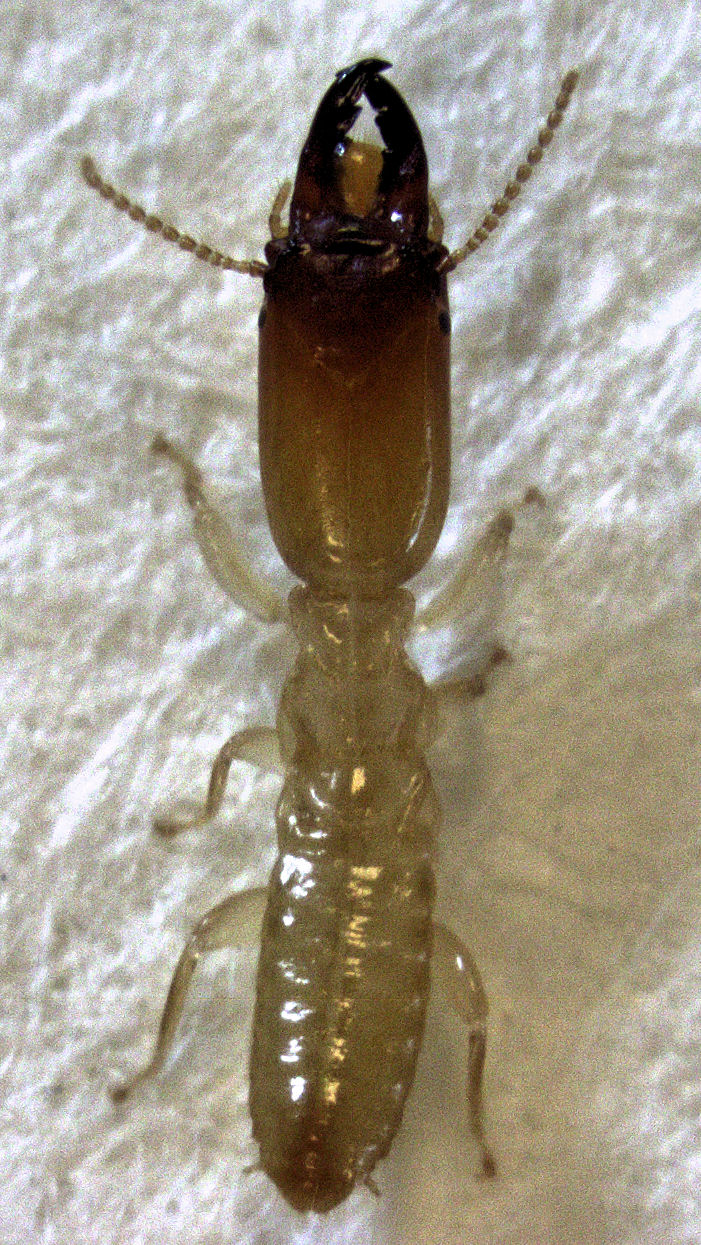
- Stolotermes ruficeps soldier

Scientific classification
- Domain: Eukaryota
- Kingdom: Animalia
- Phylum: Arthropoda
- Class: Insecta
- Order: Blattodea
- Infraorder: Isoptera
- Parvorder: Euisoptera
- Family: Stolotermitidae; Holmgren, 1910

= Stolotermitidae =

Family of termites

Stolotermitidae is a family of termites in the order Blattodea, with two extant genera formerly placed in the family Termopsidae. There are about 14 described species in Stolotermitidae.

== Genera ==
GBIF and the Termite Catalogue list the following:

- Porotermes Hagen, 1858
- Stolotermes Hagen, 1858
- † Chilgatermes Engel, Pan & Jacobs, 2013
