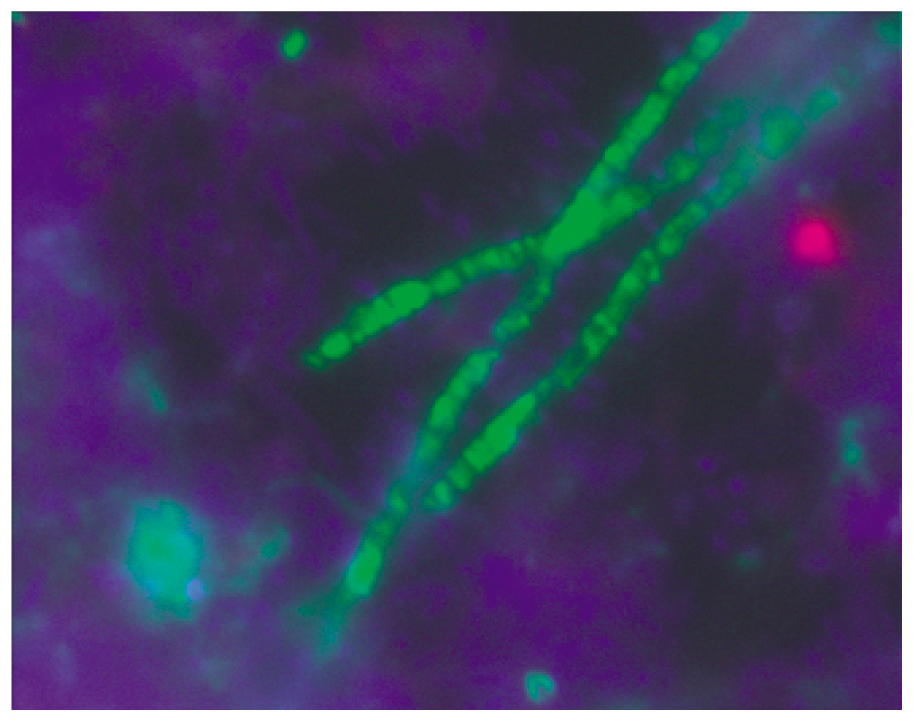
- Acidobacterium cf. capsulatum

Scientific classification
- Domain: Bacteria
- Kingdom: Pseudomonadati
- Phylum: Acidobacteriota
- Class: "Acidobacteriia"
- Order: Acidobacteriales
- Family: Acidobacteriaceae
- Genus: Acidobacterium; Kishimoto et al. 1991

Type species
- Acidobacterium capsulatum Kishimoto et al. 1991

Species
- A. capsulatum

= Acidobacterium =

Genus of bacteria

Acidobacterium is a bacterial genus from the family of Acidobacteriaceae.
