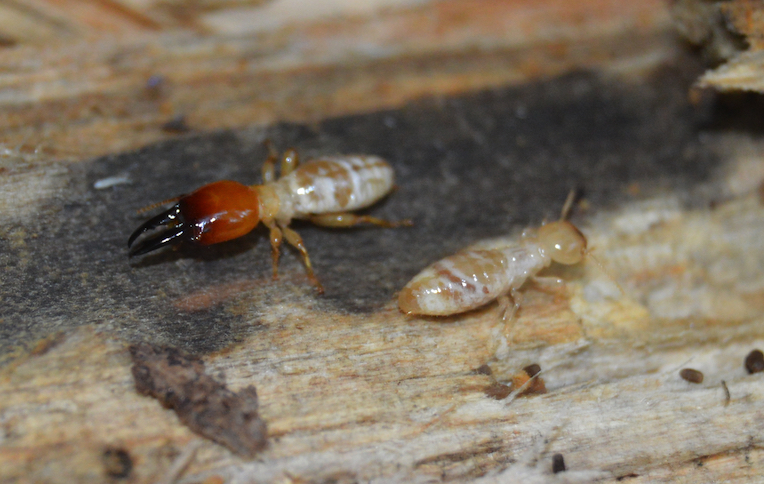

Scientific classification
- Kingdom: Animalia
- Phylum: Arthropoda
- Class: Insecta
- Order: Blattodea
- Infraorder: Isoptera
- Family: Archotermopsidae
- Genus: Zootermopsis; Emerson, 1933

Species
- Zootermopsis angusticollis; †Zootermopsis coloradensis; Zootermopsis laticeps; Zootermopsis nevadensis

= Zootermopsis =

Genus of termites

Zootermopsis is a genus of termites in the family Archotermopsidae. They are mostly found in western North America, ranging from Canada to Mexico, with the exception of Z. nevadensis, which has become established in Japan. They live in rotting wood, commonly inhabiting fallen or dead trees in North America's temperate rain forests, where they break down the wood's cellulose with the help of symbiotic protozoa and bacteria in their stomachs. The life and reproductive cycles of these termites are relatively normal compared to other members of its family. Species can be identified using the shape and position of the subsidiary tooth in all non-soldier castes, allowing a more certain identification than the previous method, which was based on the more ambiguous morphology of soldiers.

== Species ==
The genus has four species, one of which is extinct. Z. nevadensis is further subdivided into two subspecies, Z. n. nevadensis and Z. n. nuttingi.

These species are:

- Zootermopsis angusticollis
- †Zootermopsis coloradensis
- Zootermopsis laticeps
- Zootermopsis nevadensis
