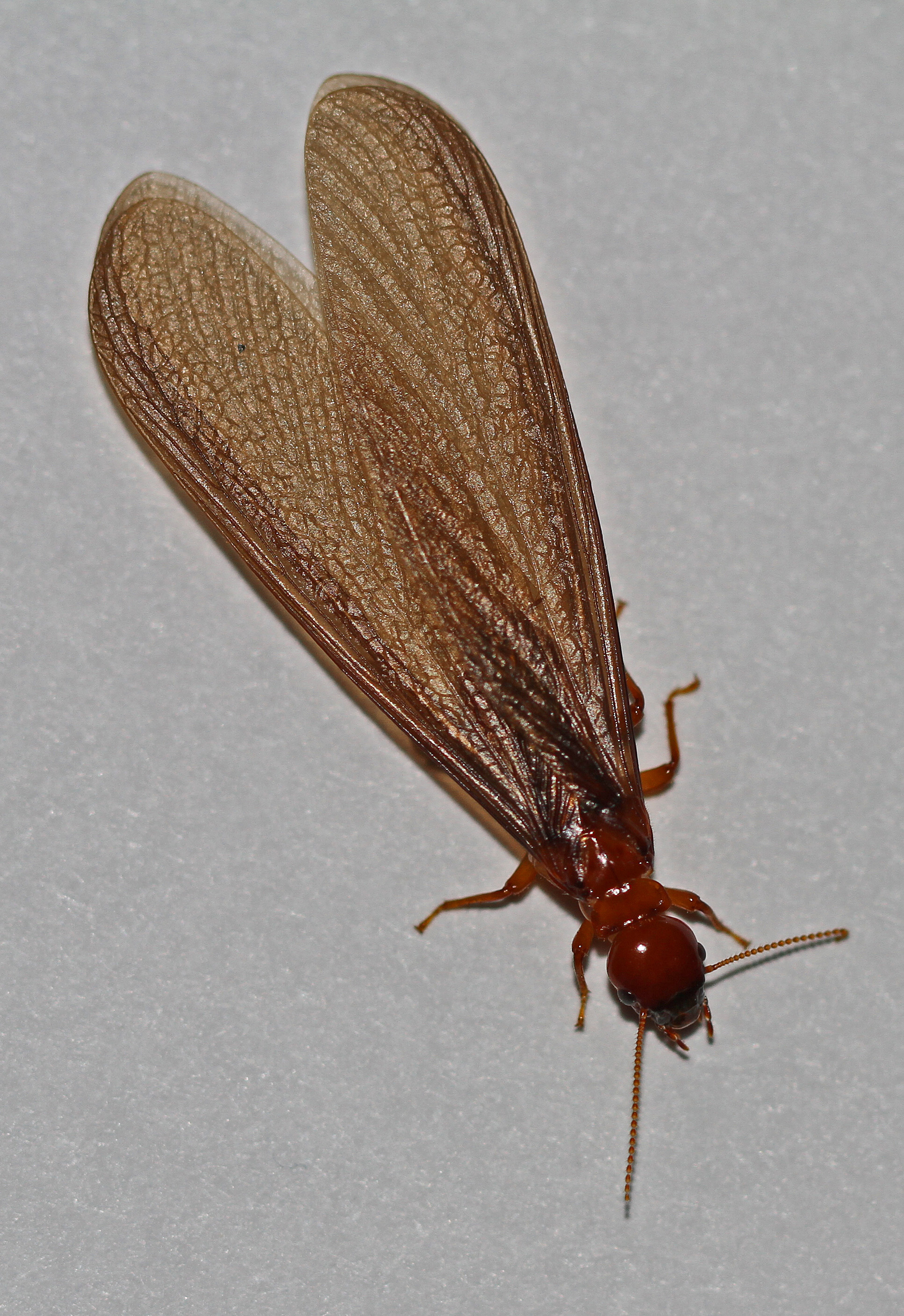
- Pacific Coast Dampwood Termite, Zootermopsis angusticollis, British Columbia

Scientific classification
- Kingdom: Animalia
- Phylum: Arthropoda
- Clade: Pancrustacea
- Class: Insecta
- Order: Blattodea
- Infraorder: Isoptera
- Clade: Teletisoptera
- Family: Archotermopsidae; Engel et al., 2009

Genera
- Archotermopsis; Gyatermes; Parotermes; Zootermopsis

= Archotermopsidae =

Family of termites

Archotermopsidae is a family of termites in the order Blattodea, known as dampwood termites, formerly included within the family Termopsidae. They constitute a small and rather primitive family with two extant genera and 5 living species. They may rarely infest structures but do not usually do so, nor do they cause extensive damage to buildings or other man-made structures unless said structure has been sufficiently damaged such as by water. As their name implies, they eat wood that is not dried out, perhaps even rotting, and are consequently of little use to humans.

== Taxonomy ==
In 2009, the five extant genera from the family Termopsidae (Archotermopsis, Hodotermopsis, Porotermes, Stolotermes, and Zootermopsis) were moved to a newly created family, Archotermopsidae (Zootermopsis had previously been treated as part of the family Hodotermitidae), so that the family Termopsidae now includes only fossil taxa: Asiatermes, Huaxiatermes, and Mesotermopsis (Early Cretaceous of China); Cretatermes carpenteri (Upper Cretaceous of Labrador); Lutetiatermes prisca (Upper Cretaceous amber of France); Paleotermopsis oligocenicus (Upper Oligocene of France); Parotermes insignis (Oligocene of Colorado); and Valditermes (incertae sedis). The genera Porotermes and Stolotermes were later placed into a separate family, Stolotermitidae.

As of April 6, 2022, the genus Hodotermopsis has been moved to the newly elevated family Hodotermopsidae, leaving Archotermopsidae with Archotermopsis and Zootermopsis as its only extant genera.
