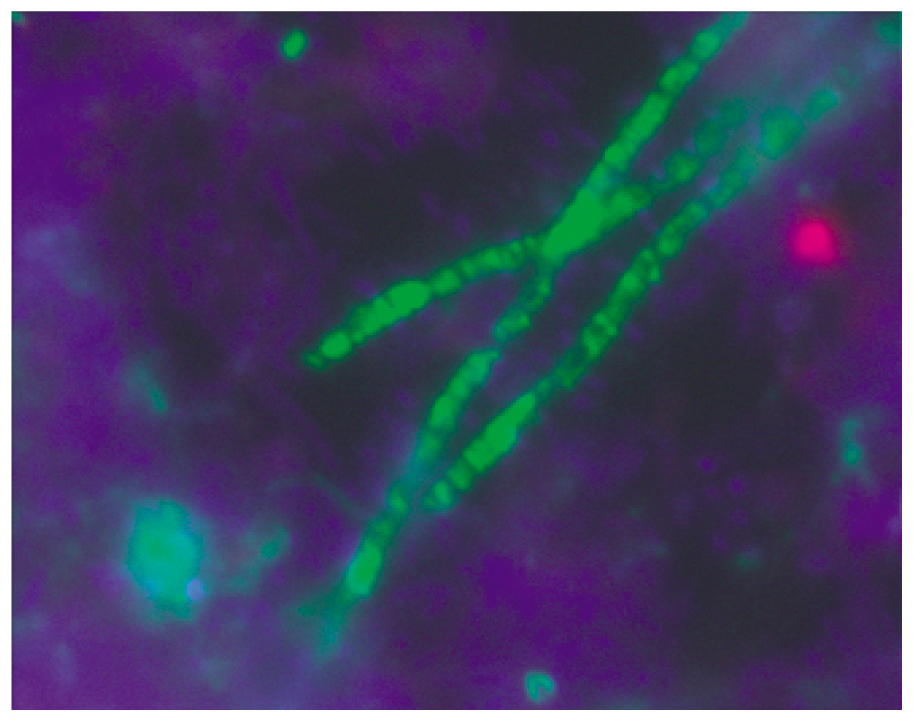
- Acidobacterium cf. capsulatum

Scientific classification
- Domain: Bacteria
- Kingdom: Pseudomonadati
- Phylum: Acidobacteriota
- Class: "Acidobacteriia"
- Order: Acidobacteriales; Cavalier-Smith 2002
- Family: Acidobacteriaceae; Thrash and Coates 2012

Type genus
- Acidobacterium Kishimoto et al. 1991

Genera
- See text

= Acidobacteriaceae =

Family of bacteria

The Acidobacteriaceae are a family of Acidobacteriota.

== Phylogeny ==
The currently accepted taxonomy is based on the List of Prokaryotic names with Standing in Nomenclature and National Center for Biotechnology Information (NCBI).

16S rRNA based LTP_10_2024

- - Occallatibacter Foesel et al. 2016 [incl. Terracidiphilus Garcia-Fraile et al. 2016]
  - - - Telmatobacter Pankratov et al. 2012
      - Acidicapsa Kulichevskaya et al. 2012
    - - - - Alloacidobacterium Zhang et al. 2022
          - Paracidobacterium Zhang et al. 2022
        - - Acidipila Okamura et al. 2015
          - - Silvibacterium Llado et al. 2016
            - - Acidisarcina Belova et al. 2022
              - Acidobacterium Kishimoto et al. 1991
                [incl. Pseudacidobacterium Zhang et al. 2022]
      - - Terriglobus Eichorst et al. 2007
        - - Bryocella Dedysh et al. 2012
          - - Granulicella Pankratov & Dedysh 2010
            - - Edaphobacter Koch et al. 2008
              - - Edaphobacter dinghuensis Wang et al. 2016
                - - Tunturiibacter corrig. Messyasz et al. 2024
                  - Granulicella species-group 2

120 marker proteins based GTDB 10-RS226

- - - Terriglobus
    - - Granulicella [incl. Bryocella]
      - Edaphobacter [incl. Tunturiibacter]
  - - - Acidisarcina
      - - Acidipila
        - - - Alloacidobacterium
            - Pseudacidobacterium
          - - Acidobacterium
            - - Paracidobacterium
              - Silvibacterium
    - - Acidicapsa
      - Terracidiphilus [incl. Occallatibacter;
        "Ca. Sulfuritelmatomonas" corrig. Hausmann et al. 2018]

== See also ==
- List of bacterial orders
- List of bacteria genera
