= E. flavum =

E. flavum may refer to:

- Eriogonum flavum, the alpine golden buckwheat, a plant species native to northwestern North America
- Etheostoma flavum, the saffron darter, a fish species found in Tennessee
- Edaphobaculum flavum a bacterial species from the genus of Edaphobaculum

== See also ==
- Flavum
