= Parasegetibacter luojiensis =

Scientific classification
- Domain: Bacteria
- Kingdom: Pseudomonadati
- Phylum: Bacteroidota
- Class: Chitinophagia
- Order: Chitinophagales
- Family: Chitinophagaceae
- Genus: Parasediminibacterium
- Species: P. luojiensis

Binomial name
- Parasediminibacterium luojiensis Zhang et al. 2009

Type strain
- CCTCC AB 208240, KCTC 22561, RHYL-37

Synonyms
- Parasegitibacter luojiensis

Bacterium

Parasegetibacter luojiensis is a Gram-negative, strictly aerobic, non-spore-forming, heterotrophic and motile bacterium from the genus of Parasegetibacter which has been isolated from forest soil from the tree Populus euphratica from Xinjiang in China.
