= Pseudoflavitalea soli =

Scientific classification
- Domain: Bacteria
- Kingdom: Pseudomonadati
- Phylum: Bacteroidota
- Class: Chitinophagia
- Order: Chitinophagales
- Family: Chitinophagaceae
- Genus: Flavitalea
- Species: F. soli

Binomial name
- Flavitalea soli Kim et al. 2016

Type strain
- KIS20-3, JCM 19937, KACC 17319

Synonyms
- Pseudoflavitalea soli (Kim et al. 2016) Kim et al. 2016

Bacterium

Flavitalea soli or Pseudoflavitalea soli is a Gram-negative, rod-shaped and mesophilic bacterium which was initially isolated from soil from the Baengnyeong Island in Korea. The species was initially classified as Flavitalea soli when it was first described in 2016, was reclassified later that year into the novel genus Pseudoflavitalea.
