= Parasegetibacter terrae =

Scientific classification
- Domain: Bacteria
- Kingdom: Pseudomonadati
- Phylum: Bacteroidota
- Class: Chitinophagia
- Order: Chitinophagales
- Family: Chitinophagaceae
- Genus: Parasediminibacterium
- Species: P. terrae

Binomial name
- Parasediminibacterium terrae Kim et al. 2015

Type strain
- JCM 19942, KACC 17341, SGM2-10

Bacterium

Parasegetibacter terrae is a Gram-negative, variably shaped and aerobic bacterium from the genus of Parasegetibacter which has been isolated from paddy soil from Suwon in Korea.
