= T. koreensis =

T. koreensis may refer to:

- Taibaiella koreensis, a Gram-negative bacterium.
- Tanakia koreensis, a species of cyprinid.
- Terrabacter koreensis, a Gram-positive bacterium.
- Tetragenococcus koreensis, a Gram-positive bacterium.
