= Chitinophaga pendula =

Scientific classification
- Domain: Bacteria
- Kingdom: Pseudomonadati
- Phylum: Bacteroidota
- Class: Chitinophagia
- Order: Chitinophagales
- Family: Chitinophagaceae
- Genus: Chitinophaga
- Species: C. pendula

Binomial name
- Chitinophaga pendula Onouye et al. 2023

Species of bacteria

Chitinophaga pendula is a bacteria from the family Chitinophagaceae. It was first isolated and found in the soil in Japan. This bacteria is known for its ability to degrade chitin, which is a composite polysaccharide found in the cell walls of fungi and the exoskeletons of the majority of arthropods. Chitinophaga pendula has been studied for its potential applications/uses in bioremediation and the production of chitinase enzymes which can prove extremely useful as a pesticide along with a couple other uses. This bacteria was discovered in August 2023.
