= T. terrae =

T. terrae may refer to:

- Terrabacter terrae, a Gram-positive bacterium
- Terrimonas terrae, a Gram-negative bacterium
