= T. soli =

T. soli may refer to:

- Taibaiella soli, a Gram-negative bacterium.
- Terrimonas soli, a Gram-negative bacterium.
- Tsukamurella soli, a Gram-positive bacterium.
- Tumebacillus soli, a Gram-positive bacterium.
