= Filimonas endophytica =

Scientific classification
- Domain: Bacteria
- Kingdom: Pseudomonadati
- Phylum: Bacteroidota
- Class: Chitinophagia
- Order: Chitinophagales
- Family: Chitinophagaceae
- Genus: Filimonas
- Species: F. endophytica

Binomial name
- Filimonas endophytica Han et al. 2015

Type strain
- JCM 19844, KCTC 42060, strain SR 2-06

Bacterium

Filimonas endophytica is a Gram-negative bacterium from the genus of Filimonas which has been isolated from the roots of the plant Cosmos bipinnatus.
