= Chitinophaga aurantiaca =

Scientific classification
- Domain: Bacteria
- Kingdom: Pseudomonadati
- Phylum: Bacteroidota
- Class: Chitinophagia
- Order: Chitinophagales
- Family: Chitinophagaceae
- Genus: Chitinophaga
- Species: C. aurantiaca

Binomial name
- Chitinophaga aurantiaca Kim et al. 2019

Type strain
- THG-SD5.5

Species of bacteria

Chitinophaga aurantiaca is a Gram-negative, rod-shaped, facultatively anaerobic and non-motile bacterium from the genus Chitinophaga.
