= Niastella koreensis =

Scientific classification
- Domain: Bacteria
- Kingdom: Pseudomonadati
- Phylum: Bacteroidota
- Class: Chitinophagia
- Order: Chitinophagales
- Family: Chitinophagaceae
- Genus: Niastella
- Species: N. koreensis

Binomial name
- Niastella koreensis Weon et al. 2006

Type strain
- DSM 17620, GR20-10, KACC 11465

Species of bacterium

Niastella koreensis is a species of gram-negative bacterium from the genus of Niastella which has been isolated from soil from a ginseng field in Yeongju in Korea.
