= Terrimonas lutea =

Scientific classification
- Domain: Bacteria
- Kingdom: Pseudomonadati
- Phylum: Bacteroidota
- Class: Chitinophagia
- Order: Chitinophagales
- Family: Chitinophagaceae
- Genus: Terrimonas
- Species: T. lutea

Binomial name
- Terrimonas lutea Xie and Yokota 2006

Type strain
- CCTCC AB205006, IAM 15284, JCM 21735, strain DY

Synonyms
- Imcbia portoki

Bacterium

Terrimonas lutea is a bacterium from the genus of Terrimonas which has been isolated from soil from a garden in Japan.
