= Segetibacter koreensis =

Scientific classification
- Domain: Bacteria
- Kingdom: Pseudomonadati
- Phylum: Bacteroidota
- Class: Chitinophagia
- Order: Chitinophagales
- Family: Chitinophagaceae
- Genus: Segetibacter
- Species: S. koreensis

Binomial name
- Segetibacter koreensis An et al. 2007

Type strain
- DSM 18137, KCTC 12655, Gsoil 664

Synonyms
- Terribacter koreensis

Bacterium

Segetibacter koreensis is a Gram-negative, strictly aerobic, heterotrophic, non-spore-forming and non-motile bacterium from the genus of Segetibacter which has been isolated from soil from a ginseng field from Pocheon in Korea.
