= Niastella gongjuensis =

Scientific classification
- Domain: Bacteria
- Kingdom: Pseudomonadati
- Phylum: Bacteroidota
- Class: Chitinophagia
- Order: Chitinophagales
- Family: Chitinophagaceae
- Genus: Niastella
- Species: N. gongjuensis

Binomial name
- Niastella gongjuensis Kim et al. 2015

Type strain
- JCM 19941, KACC 17399, 5GH22-11

Species of bacterium

Niastella gongjuensis is a Gram-negative and aerobic bacterium from the genus of Niastella which has been isolated from soil from a greenhouse from Gongju in Korea.
