= Niastella yeongjuensis =

Scientific classification
- Domain: Bacteria
- Kingdom: Pseudomonadati
- Phylum: Bacteroidota
- Class: Chitinophagia
- Order: Chitinophagales
- Family: Chitinophagaceae
- Genus: Niastella
- Species: N. yeongjuensis

Binomial name
- Niastella yeongjuensis Weon et al. 2006

Type strain
- DSM 17621, GR20-13, KACC 11466

Synonyms
- Niastella jeongjuensis

Species of bacterium

Niastella yeongjuensis is a gram-negative bacterium from the genus of Niastella which has been isolated from soil from a ginseng field in Yeongju in Korea.
