= Flaviaesturariibacter terrae =

Scientific classification
- Domain: Bacteria
- Kingdom: Pseudomonadati
- Phylum: Bacteroidota
- Class: Chitinophagia
- Order: Chitinophagales
- Family: Chitinophagaceae
- Genus: Flaviaesturariibacter
- Species: F. terrae

Binomial name
- Flaviaesturariibacter terrae Okiria et al. 2017

Type strain
- JCM 31723, KCTC 52511, strain HY03

Synonyms
- Flavaestuariibacter terrae

Bacterium

Flaviaesturariibacter terrae is a Gram-negative, rod-shaped, aerobic and non-motile bacterium from the genus of Flaviaesturariibacter which has been isolated from mountain soil.
