= Arachidicoccus soli =

Scientific classification
- Domain: Bacteria
- Kingdom: Pseudomonadati
- Phylum: Bacteroidota
- Class: Chitinophagia
- Order: Chitinophagales
- Family: Chitinophagaceae
- Genus: Arachidicoccus
- Species: A. soli

Binomial name
- Arachidicoccus soli Lee et al. 2020

Type strain
- KIS59-12

Bacterium

Arachidicoccus soli is a Gram-negative, aerobic, rod-shaped and non-motile bacterium from the genus Arachidicoccus which has been isolated from soil from the Hodo island in Korea.
