= Terrimonas aquatica =

Scientific classification
- Domain: Bacteria
- Kingdom: Pseudomonadati
- Phylum: Bacteroidota
- Class: Chitinophagia
- Order: Chitinophagales
- Family: Chitinophagaceae
- Genus: Terrimonas
- Species: T. aquatica

Binomial name
- Terrimonas aquatica Sheu et al. 2010

Type strain
- BCRC 17941, LMG 24825, strain RIB1-6

Bacterium

Terrimonas aquatica is a Gram-negative, rod-shaped, aerobic and non-motile bacterium from the genus of Terrimonas which has been isolated from a freshwater spring from Taiwan.
