= Arachidicoccus ginsenosidivorans =

Scientific classification
- Domain: Bacteria
- Kingdom: Pseudomonadati
- Phylum: Bacteroidota
- Class: Chitinophagia
- Order: Chitinophagales
- Family: Chitinophagaceae
- Genus: Arachidicoccus
- Species: A. ginsenosidivorans

Binomial name
- Arachidicoccus ginsenosidivorans Siddiqi et al. 2017

Type strain
- JCM 30984, KCTC 22820, Gsoil 809

Bacterium

Arachidicoccus ginsenosidivorans is a Gram-negative, aerobic and non-motile bacterium from the genus Arachidicoccus which has been isolated from soil from a ginseng field from Pocheon in Korea.
