= Taibaiella smilacinae =

Scientific classification
- Domain: Bacteria
- Kingdom: Pseudomonadati
- Phylum: Bacteroidota
- Class: Chitinophagia
- Order: Chitinophagales
- Family: Chitinophagaceae
- Genus: Taibaiella
- Species: T. smilacinae

Binomial name
- Taibaiella smilacinae Zhang et al. 2013

Type strain
- CCTCC AB 2013017, KCTC 32316, PTJT-5

Bacterium

Taibaiella smilacinae is a Gram-negative, rod-shaped, strictly aerobic and non-motile bacterium from the genus of Taibaiella which has been isolated from the stem of the plant Smilacina japonica from Shaanxi in China.
