= Taibaiella helva =

Scientific classification
- Domain: Bacteria
- Kingdom: Pseudomonadati
- Phylum: Bacteroidota
- Class: Chitinophagia
- Order: Chitinophagales
- Family: Chitinophagaceae
- Genus: Taibaiella
- Species: T. helva

Binomial name
- Taibaiella helva Chen et al. 2019

Bacterium

Taibaiella helva is a Gram-negative, strictly aerobic, oval-shaped, non-spore-forming and motile bacterium from the genus of Taibaiella which has been isolated from farmland soil from Qianshan in China.
