= Terrimonas pekingensis =

Scientific classification
- Domain: Bacteria
- Kingdom: Pseudomonadati
- Phylum: Bacteroidota
- Class: Chitinophagia
- Order: Chitinophagales
- Family: Chitinophagaceae
- Genus: Terrimonas
- Species: T. pekingensis

Binomial name
- Terrimonas pekingensis Jin et al. 2013

Type strain
- CICC 10452, NCCB 100397, strain QH

Synonyms
- Terrimonas pekingense

Bacterium

Terrimonas pekingensis is a Gram-negative, strictly aerobic, non-spore-forming and non-motile bacterium from the genus of Terrimonas which has been isolated from bulking sludge from a wastewater treatment plant from Beijing in China.
