= Flaviaesturariibacter amylovorans =

Scientific classification
- Domain: Bacteria
- Kingdom: Pseudomonadati
- Phylum: Bacteroidota
- Class: Chitinophagia
- Order: Chitinophagales
- Family: Chitinophagaceae
- Genus: Flaviaesturariibacter
- Species: F. amylovorans

Binomial name
- Flaviaesturariibacter amylovorans Kang et al. 2015

Type strain
- JCM 17919, KACC 16454, GCR0105

Synonyms
- Flavaestuariibacter amylovorans

Bacterium

Flaviaesturariibacter amylovorans is a Gram-negative, rod-shaped and non-motile bacterium from the genus of Flaviaesturariibacter which has been isolated from estuarine water from Jeollabuk-do in Korea.
