= Taibaiella coffeisoli =

Scientific classification
- Domain: Bacteria
- Kingdom: Pseudomonadati
- Phylum: Bacteroidota
- Class: Chitinophagia
- Order: Chitinophagales
- Family: Chitinophagaceae
- Genus: Taibaiella
- Species: T. coffeisoli

Binomial name
- Taibaiella coffeisoli Szabo et al. 2016

Type strain
- CCM 8601, NCAIM B 02601, strain TZCO2

Synonyms
- Taibaiella coffeasoli

Bacterium

Taibaiella coffeisoli is a Gram-negative, rod-shaped, obligately aerobic, non-spore-forming and non-motile bacterium from the genus of Taibaiella which has been isolated from soil from a coffee plantation from Arusha in East Africa.
