= Terrabacter ginsenosidimutans =

Scientific classification
- Domain: Bacteria
- Kingdom: Bacillati
- Phylum: Actinomycetota
- Class: Actinomycetes
- Order: Micrococcales
- Family: Intrasporangiaceae
- Genus: Terrabacter
- Species: T. ginsenosidimutans

Binomial name
- Terrabacter ginsenosidimutans An et al. 2010

Species of bacteria

Terrabacter ginsenosidimutans is a species of Gram-positive, nonmotile, non-endospore-forming bacteria. Cells are short rods. It was initially isolated from ginseng soil from a farm near Pocheon, South Korea. The species was first described in 2010, and its name refers the bacteria's ability to transform ginsenosides into rare gypenosides.

The optimum growth temperature for T. ginsenosidimutans is 30 °C and can grow in the 10-40 °C range. The optimum pH is 7.0 and can grow in pH 5.0-10.0.
