= Flavihumibacter sediminis =

Scientific classification
- Domain: Bacteria
- Kingdom: Pseudomonadati
- Phylum: Bacteroidota
- Class: Chitinophagia
- Order: Chitinophagales
- Family: Chitinophagaceae
- Genus: Flavihumibacter
- Species: F. sediminis

Binomial name
- Flavihumibacter sediminis Lee and Cha 2016

Type strain
- AM3, JCM 31431, KACC 18874, strain CJ663

Bacterium

Flavihumibacter sediminis is a Gram-negative, rod-shaped, aerobic and non-motil bacterium from the genus of Flavihumibacter which has been isolated from tidal flat sediments from Ganghwa-do in Korea.
