= Hydrotalea sandarakina =

Scientific classification
- Domain: Bacteria
- Kingdom: Pseudomonadati
- Phylum: Bacteroidota
- Class: Chitinophagia
- Order: Chitinophagales
- Family: Chitinophagaceae
- Genus: Hydrotalea
- Species: H. sandarakina

Binomial name
- Hydrotalea sandarakina Albuquerque et al. 2012

Type strain
- DSM 23241, LMG 25526, strain AF-51

Bacterium

Hydrotalea sandarakina is a bacterium from the genus of Hydrotalea which has been isolated from water from a hot spring from Azores Islands in Portugal.
