= Niabella pedocola =

Scientific classification
- Domain: Bacteria
- Kingdom: Pseudomonadati
- Phylum: Bacteroidota
- Class: Chitinophagia
- Order: Chitinophagales
- Family: Chitinophagaceae
- Genus: Niabella
- Species: N. pedocola

Binomial name
- Niabella pedocola Dahal and Kim 2016

Type strain
- JCM 31011, KACC 18454, KEMB 9005-329, strain R384

Synonyms
- Niabella hwaseongensis

Bacterium

Niabella pedocola is a Gram-negative, aerobic, rod-shaped, non-spore-forming and non-motile bacterium from the genus of Niabella which has been isolated from isolated from soil.
