= Niabella aurantiaca =

Scientific classification
- Domain: Bacteria
- Kingdom: Pseudomonadati
- Phylum: Bacteroidota
- Class: Chitinophagia
- Order: Chitinophagales
- Family: Chitinophagaceae
- Genus: Niabella
- Species: N. aurantiaca

Binomial name
- Niabella aurantiaca Kim et al. 2007

Type strain
- DSM 17617, KACC 11698, R2A15-11

Bacterium

Niabella aurantiaca is a Gram-negative, strictly aerobic and non-spore-forming bacterium from the genus of Niabella which has been isolated from greenhouse soil from Yeoju inn Korea.
