= Flavitalea gansuensis =

Scientific classification
- Domain: Bacteria
- Kingdom: Pseudomonadati
- Phylum: Bacteroidota
- Class: Chitinophagia
- Order: Chitinophagales
- Family: Chitinophagaceae
- Genus: Flavitalea
- Species: F. gansuensis

Binomial name
- Flavitalea gansuensis Zhang et al. 2013

Type strain
- ACCC 05418, KCTC 23071, strain JCN-23

Bacterium

Flavitalea gansuensis is a Gram-negative and rod-shaped bacterium from the genus of Flavitalea which has been isolated from the soil of an arid area in the Gansu Province in China.
