= Flavihumibacter petaseus =

Scientific classification
- Domain: Bacteria
- Kingdom: Pseudomonadati
- Phylum: Bacteroidota
- Class: Chitinophagia
- Order: Chitinophagales
- Family: Chitinophagaceae
- Genus: Flavihumibacter
- Species: F. petaseus

Binomial name
- Flavihumibacter petaseus Zhang et al. 2010

Type strain
- CGMCC 1.7723, NBRC 106054, strain T41

Bacterium

Flavihumibacter petaseus is a Gram-negative and short rod-shaped bacterium from the genus of Flavihumibacter which has been isolated from greenhouse soil from Korea.
