= Sediminibacterium ginsengisoli =

Scientific classification
- Domain: Bacteria
- Kingdom: Pseudomonadati
- Phylum: Bacteroidota
- Class: Chitinophagia
- Order: Chitinophagales
- Family: Chitinophagaceae
- Genus: Sediminibacterium
- Species: S. ginsengisoli

Binomial name
- Sediminibacterium ginsengisoli Kim et al. 2013

Type strain
- DSM 22335, JCM 15794, KCTC 12833, strain DCY13

Synonyms
- Solibium soli, Solibius ginsengiterrae

Bacterium

Sediminibacterium ginsengisoli is a Gram-negative, non-spore-forming, facultatively anaerobic and motile bacterium from the genus of Sediminibacterium which has been isolated from soil from a ginseng field from Pocheon in Korea.
