= Lacibacter cauensis =

Scientific classification
- Domain: Bacteria
- Kingdom: Pseudomonadati
- Phylum: Bacteroidota
- Class: Chitinophagia
- Order: Chitinophagales
- Family: Chitinophagaceae
- Genus: Lacibacter
- Species: L. cauensis

Binomial name
- Lacibacter cauensis Qu et al. 2009

Type strain
- CGMCC 1.7271, NBRC 104930, strain NJ-8

Bacterium

Lacibacter cauensis is a Gram-negative and aerobic bacterium from the genus of Lacibacter which has been isolated from sediments from the Taihu Lake in China.
