= Flavisolibacter ginsenosidimutans =

Scientific classification
- Domain: Bacteria
- Kingdom: Pseudomonadati
- Phylum: Bacteroidota
- Class: Chitinophagia
- Order: Chitinophagales
- Family: Chitinophagaceae
- Genus: Flavisolibacter
- Species: F. ginsenosidimutans

Binomial name
- Flavisolibacter ginsenosidimutans Zhao et al. 2015

Type strain
- JCM 18196, KACC 14277, KCTC 22818, Gsoil 636

Bacterium

Flavisolibacter ginsenosidimutans is a Gram-negative, rod-shaped, aerobic and non-motile bacterium from the genus of Flavisolibacter which has been isolated from soil from a ginseng field from Pocheon in Korea.
