= Pseudoflavitalea rhizosphaerae =

Scientific classification
- Domain: Bacteria
- Kingdom: Pseudomonadati
- Phylum: Bacteroidota
- Class: Chitinophagia
- Order: Chitinophagales
- Family: Chitinophagaceae
- Genus: Pseudoflavitalea
- Species: P. rhizosphaerae

Binomial name
- Pseudoflavitalea rhizosphaerae Kim et al. 2016

Type strain
- KACC 18655, NBRC 111880, T16R-265

Bacterium

Pseudoflavitalea rhizosphaerae is a Gram-negative and aerobic bacterium from the genus of Pseudoflavitalea which has been isolated from the rhizosphere of a tomato plant from Buyeo-gun in Korea.
