= Flavihumibacter solisilvae =

Scientific classification
- Domain: Bacteria
- Kingdom: Pseudomonadati
- Phylum: Bacteroidota
- Class: Chitinophagia
- Order: Chitinophagales
- Family: Chitinophagaceae
- Genus: Flavihumibacter
- Species: F. solisilvae

Binomial name
- Flavihumibacter solisilvae Lee et al. 2014

Type strain
- JCM 19891, KACC 17917, strain 3_3

Bacterium

Flavihumibacter solisilvae is a Gram-negative, strictly aerobic and non-motile bacterium from the genus of Flavihumibacter which has been isolated from soil from the Bac Kan Province in Vietnam.
