= Chitinophaga alhagiae =

Scientific classification
- Domain: Bacteria
- Kingdom: Pseudomonadati
- Phylum: Bacteroidota
- Class: Chitinophagia
- Order: Chitinophagales
- Family: Chitinophagaceae
- Genus: Chitinophaga
- Species: C. alhagiae

Binomial name
- Chitinophaga alhagiae Zou et al. 2019

Type strain
- T22

Species of bacteria

Chitinophaga alhagiae is a Gram-negative and rod-shaped bacterium from the genus Chitinophaga which has been isolated from rhizospheric soil from the plant Alhagi sparsifolia from Xinjiang in China.
