= Flavisolibacter rigui =

Scientific classification
- Domain: Bacteria
- Kingdom: Pseudomonadati
- Phylum: Bacteroidota
- Class: Chitinophagia
- Order: Chitinophagales
- Family: Chitinophagaceae
- Genus: Flavisolibacter
- Species: F. rigui

Binomial name
- Flavisolibacter rigui Baik et al. 2014

Type strain
- JCM 17515, KCTC 23328, strain 02SUJ3

Bacterium

Flavisolibacter rigui is a Gram-negative, aerobic, rod-shaped and non-motile bacterium from the genus of Flavisolibacter which has been isolated from freshwater from the Juam Reservoir in Korea.
