= Ferruginibacter alkalilentus =

Scientific classification
- Domain: Bacteria
- Kingdom: Pseudomonadati
- Phylum: Bacteroidota
- Class: Chitinophagia
- Order: Chitinophagales
- Family: Chitinophagaceae
- Genus: Ferruginibacter
- Species: F. alkalilentus

Binomial name
- Ferruginibacter alkalilentus Lim et al. 2009

Type strain
- KCTC 22306, LMG 24312, HU1-GD23

Bacterium

Ferruginibacter alkalilentus is a Gram-negative and rod-shaped bacterium from the genus of Ferruginibacter which has been isolated from freshwater sediments.
