= Terrimonas crocea =

Scientific classification
- Domain: Bacteria
- Kingdom: Pseudomonadati
- Phylum: Bacteroidota
- Class: Chitinophagia
- Order: Chitinophagales
- Family: Chitinophagaceae
- Genus: Terrimonas
- Species: T. crocea

Binomial name
- Terrimonas crocea Kim et al. 2017

Type strain
- CCTCC AB 2016103, KCTC 52448, M1-33108

Bacterium

Terrimonas crocea is a Gram-negative, rod-shaped, aerobic, non-spore-forming and non-motile bacterium from the genus of Terrimonas which has been isolated from the glacier Midtre Lovénbreen from Norway.
