= Filimonas aurantiibacter =

Scientific classification
- Domain: Bacteria
- Kingdom: Pseudomonadati
- Phylum: Bacteroidota
- Class: Chitinophagia
- Order: Chitinophagales
- Family: Chitinophagaceae
- Genus: Filimonas
- Species: F. aurantiibacter

Binomial name
- Filimonas aurantiibacter Albert et al. 2016

Type strain
- LMG 29039, NRRL B-65305, strain 1458

Synonyms
- Filimonas limnobacter

Bacterium

Filimonas aurantiibacter is a Gram-negative bacterium from the genus of Filimonas which has been isolated from water from the Lake Michigan.
