= Sediminibacterium goheungense =

Scientific classification
- Domain: Bacteria
- Kingdom: Pseudomonadati
- Phylum: Bacteroidota
- Class: Chitinophagia
- Order: Chitinophagales
- Family: Chitinophagaceae
- Genus: Sediminibacterium
- Species: S. goheungense

Binomial name
- Sediminibacterium goheungense Kang et al. 2014

Type strain
- CECT 8100, KCTC 23945, HME7863

Bacterium

Sediminibacterium goheungense is a Gram-negative, rod-shaped, strictly aerobic and motile bacterium from the genus of Sediminibacterium which has been isolated from water from a freshwater reservoir from Goheung in Korea.
