= Flaviaesturariibacter flavus =

Scientific classification
- Domain: Bacteria
- Kingdom: Pseudomonadati
- Phylum: Bacteroidota
- Class: Chitinophagia
- Order: Chitinophagales
- Family: Chitinophagaceae
- Genus: Flaviaesturariibacter
- Species: F. flavus

Binomial name
- Flaviaesturariibacter flavus Jang et al. 2020

Type strain
- 17J68-12

Bacterium

Flaviaesturariibacter flavus is a Gram-negative and non-motile bacterium from the genus of Flaviaesturariibacter which has been isolated from soil from the Jeju Island in Korea.
