= Niabella soli =

Scientific classification
- Domain: Bacteria
- Kingdom: Pseudomonadati
- Phylum: Bacteroidota
- Class: Chitinophagia
- Order: Chitinophagales
- Family: Chitinophagaceae
- Genus: Niabella
- Species: N. soli

Binomial name
- Niabella soli Weon et al. 2008

Type strain
- DSM 19437, KACC 12604, JS13-8

Bacterium

Niabella soli is a Gram-negative, aerobic and non-motile bacterium from the genus of Niabella which has been isolated from soil from the Jeju Island in Korea.
