= Chitinophaga agri =

Scientific classification
- Domain: Bacteria
- Kingdom: Pseudomonadati
- Phylum: Bacteroidota
- Class: Chitinophagia
- Order: Chitinophagales
- Family: Chitinophagaceae
- Genus: Chitinophaga
- Species: C. agri

Binomial name
- Chitinophaga agri Lee et al. 2020

Type strain
- H33E-04

Species of bacteria

Chitinophaga agri is a Gram-negative, aerobic and long-rod-shaped bacterium from the genus Chitinophaga.
