= Terrimonas suqianensis =

Scientific classification
- Domain: Bacteria
- Kingdom: Pseudomonadati
- Phylum: Bacteroidota
- Class: Chitinophagia
- Order: Chitinophagales
- Family: Chitinophagaceae
- Genus: Terrimonas
- Species: T. suqianensis

Binomial name
- Terrimonas suqianensis Chen et al. 2017

Bacterium

Terrimonas suqianensis is a Gram-negative, non-spore-forming and rod-shaped bacterium from the genus of Terrimonas which has been isolated from soil which was contaminated with tetrabromobisphenol A.
