= Flavisolibacter tropicus =

Scientific classification
- Domain: Bacteria
- Kingdom: Pseudomonadati
- Phylum: Bacteroidota
- Class: Chitinophagia
- Order: Chitinophagales
- Family: Chitinophagaceae
- Genus: Flavisolibacter
- Species: F. tropicus

Binomial name
- Flavisolibacter tropicus Lee et al. 2016

Type strain
- JCM 19972, KCTC 42070, strain LCS9

Bacterium

Flavisolibacter tropicus is a Gram-negative and non-motile bacterium from the genus of Flavisolibacter which has been isolated from soil from the tropical zone from Ecorium in Korea.
