= Sediminibacterium salmoneum =

Scientific classification
- Domain: Bacteria
- Kingdom: Pseudomonadati
- Phylum: Bacteroidota
- Class: Chitinophagia
- Order: Chitinophagales
- Family: Chitinophagaceae
- Genus: Sediminibacterium
- Species: S. salmoneum

Binomial name
- Sediminibacterium salmoneum Qu and Yuan 2008

Type strain
- CGMCC 1.6845, DSM 27476, NBRC 103935, strain NJ-44

Bacterium

Sediminibacterium salmoneum is a Gram-negative and motile bacterium from the genus of Sediminibacterium which has been isolated from sediments from the Guanting Reservoir from Beijing in China.
