= Parafilimonas terrae =

Scientific classification
- Domain: Bacteria
- Kingdom: Pseudomonadati
- Phylum: Bacteroidota
- Class: Chitinophagia
- Order: Chitinophagales
- Family: Chitinophagaceae
- Genus: Parafilimonas
- Species: P. terrae

Binomial name
- Parafilimonas terrae Kim et al. 2014

Type strain
- DSM 28286, KACC 17343, 5GHs7-2

Bacterium

Parafilimonas terrae is a Gram-negative and short rod-shaped bacterium from the genus of Parafilimonas which has been isolated from greenhouse soil from Yongjin-myeon in Korea.
