= Niastella vici =

Scientific classification
- Domain: Bacteria
- Kingdom: Pseudomonadati
- Phylum: Bacteroidota
- Class: Chitinophagia
- Order: Chitinophagales
- Family: Chitinophagaceae
- Genus: Niastella
- Species: N. vici

Binomial name
- Niastella vici Chen et al. 2016

Type strain
- CCTCC AB 2015052, KCTC 42474, DJ57

Species of bacterium

Niastella vici is a Gram-negative and aerobic bacterium from the genus of Niastella which has been isolated from farmland soil in Hunan in China.
