= Flavitalea antarctica =

Scientific classification
- Domain: Bacteria
- Kingdom: Pseudomonadati
- Phylum: Bacteroidota
- Class: Chitinophagia
- Order: Chitinophagales
- Family: Chitinophagaceae
- Genus: Flavitalea
- Species: F. antarctica

Binomial name
- Flavitalea antarctica Wei et al. 2017

Type strain
- CCTCC AB 2016109, AQ6-291, KCTC 52491

Bacterium

Flavitalea antarctica is a Gram-negative, rod-shaped and aerobic bacterium from the genus of Flavitalea which has been isolated from the Fildes Peninsula from the Antarctica.
