= Flavisolibacter metallilatus =

Scientific classification
- Domain: Bacteria
- Kingdom: Pseudomonadati
- Phylum: Bacteroidota
- Class: Chitinophagia
- Order: Chitinophagales
- Family: Chitinophagaceae
- Genus: Flavisolibacter
- Species: F. metallilatus

Binomial name
- Flavisolibacter metallilatus Kim et al. 2018

Type strain
- TX0661, KACC 19145, KCTC 52779, NBRC 111784

Bacterium

Flavisolibacter metallilatus is a Gram-negative, rod-shaped, aerobic and non-motile bacterium from the genus of Flavisolibacter which has been isolated from an air conditioning system from a car in Korea.
