= Flavihumibacter cheonanensis =

Scientific classification
- Domain: Bacteria
- Kingdom: Pseudomonadati
- Phylum: Bacteroidota
- Class: Chitinophagia
- Order: Chitinophagales
- Family: Chitinophagaceae
- Genus: Flavihumibacter
- Species: F. cheonanensis

Binomial name
- Flavihumibacter cheonanensis Kim et al. 2014

Type strain
- JCM 19322, KACC 17467, strain WS16

Bacterium

Flavihumibacter cheonanensis is a Gram-negative, rod-shaped, strictly aerobic and non-motile bacterium from the genus of Flavihumibacter which has been isolated from a shallow stream from Cheonan in Korea.
