= Taibaiella yonginensis =

Scientific classification
- Domain: Bacteria
- Kingdom: Pseudomonadati
- Phylum: Bacteroidota
- Class: Chitinophagia
- Order: Chitinophagales
- Family: Chitinophagaceae
- Genus: Taibaiella
- Species: T. yonginensis

Binomial name
- Taibaiella yonginensis Singh et al. 2015

Type strain
- CCTCC AB 2014316, KACC 18372, THG-SC4

Bacterium

Taibaiella yonginensis is a Gram-negative, aerobic, rod-shaped and non-motile bacterium from the genus of Taibaiella which has been isolated from soil from Yongin city from Korea.
