= Parafilimonas rhizosphaerae =

Scientific classification
- Domain: Bacteria
- Kingdom: Pseudomonadati
- Phylum: Bacteroidota
- Class: Chitinophagia
- Order: Chitinophagales
- Family: Chitinophagaceae
- Genus: Parafilimonas
- Species: P. rhizosphaerae

Binomial name
- Parafilimonas rhizosphaerae Cho et al. 2017

Type strain
- JCM 31601, KACC 18786, T16E-198

Bacterium

Parafilimonas rhizosphaerae is a Gram-negative, aerobic and rod-shaped bacterium from the genus of Parafilimonas which has been isolated from the rhizosphere of a tomato plant from Buyeo-gun in Korea.
