= Terrimonas rhizosphaerae =

Scientific classification
- Domain: Bacteria
- Kingdom: Pseudomonadati
- Phylum: Bacteroidota
- Class: Chitinophagia
- Order: Chitinophagales
- Family: Chitinophagaceae
- Genus: Terrimonas
- Species: T. rhizosphaerae

Binomial name
- Terrimonas rhizosphaerae Han et al. 2017

Type strain
- KACC 17564, NCAIM B 025317, strain CR94

Bacterium

Terrimonas rhizosphaerae is a Gram-negative, strictly aerobic and non-motile bacterium from the genus of Terrimonas which has been isolated from isolated from rhizospheric soil from a ginseng field from Geumsan in Korea.
