= Terrimonas rubra =

Scientific classification
- Domain: Bacteria
- Kingdom: Pseudomonadati
- Phylum: Bacteroidota
- Class: Chitinophagia
- Order: Chitinophagales
- Family: Chitinophagaceae
- Genus: Terrimonas
- Species: T. rubra

Binomial name
- Terrimonas rubra Zhang et al. 2012

Type strain
- CCTCC AB 2010401, KCTC 23299, strain M-8

Bacterium

Terrimonas rubra is a Gram-negative, rod-shaped, non-spore-forming and non-motile bacterium from the genus of Terrimonas which has been isolated from polluted farmland soil from China.
