= Ferruginibacter yonginensis =

Scientific classification
- Domain: Bacteria
- Kingdom: Pseudomonadati
- Phylum: Bacteroidota
- Class: Chitinophagia
- Order: Chitinophagales
- Family: Chitinophagaceae
- Genus: Ferruginibacter
- Species: F. yonginensis

Binomial name
- Ferruginibacter yonginensis Lee et al. 2014

Type strain
- CECT 8289, KACC 17314, HME8442

Bacterium

Ferruginibacter yonginensis is a Gram-negative, aerobic and rod-shaped bacterium from the genus of Ferruginibacter which has been isolated from a mesotrophic artificial lake.
