= Flaviaesturariibacter luteus =

Scientific classification
- Domain: Bacteria
- Kingdom: Pseudomonadati
- Phylum: Bacteroidota
- Class: Chitinophagia
- Order: Chitinophagales
- Family: Chitinophagaceae
- Genus: Flaviaesturariibacter
- Species: F. luteus

Binomial name
- Flaviaesturariibacter luteus Pascual et al. 2017

Type strain
- DSM 100282, LMG 29416, strain AW305

Synonyms
- Flavaestuariibacter luteus

Bacterium

Flaviaesturariibacter luteus is a Gram-negative, rod-shaped, non-spore-forming and non-motile bacterium from the genus of Flaviaesturariibacter which has been isolated from soil from an agricultural floodplain from Mashare in Namibia.
