= Lacibacter nakdongensis =

Scientific classification
- Domain: Bacteria
- Kingdom: Pseudomonadati
- Phylum: Bacteroidota
- Class: Chitinophagia
- Order: Chitinophagales
- Family: Chitinophagaceae
- Genus: Lacibacter
- Species: L. nakdongensis

Binomial name
- Lacibacter nakdongensis Han et al. 2017

Type strain
- JCM 31372, KCTC 52160, strain SS2-56

Bacterium

Lacibacter nakdongensis is a Gram-negative and non-spore-forming, bacterium from the genus of Lacibacter which has been isolated from sediments from the Nakdong River from Korea.
