= Flavihumibacter stibioxidans =

Scientific classification
- Domain: Bacteria
- Kingdom: Pseudomonadati
- Phylum: Bacteroidota
- Class: Chitinophagia
- Order: Chitinophagales
- Family: Chitinophagaceae
- Genus: Flavihumibacter
- Species: F. stibioxidans

Binomial name
- Flavihumibacter stibioxidans Han et al. 2016

Type strain
- CCTCC AB 2016053, KCTC 52205, strain YS-17

Bacterium

Flavihumibacter stibioxidans is a gram-negative, strictly aerobic, rod-shaped and non-motile bacterium from the genus of Flavihumibacter which has been isolated from soil from the Lengshuijiang antimony mine in China.
