= Sediminibacterium roseum =

Scientific classification
- Domain: Bacteria
- Kingdom: Pseudomonadati
- Phylum: Bacteroidota
- Class: Chitinophagia
- Order: Chitinophagales
- Family: Chitinophagaceae
- Genus: Sediminibacterium
- Species: S. roseum

Binomial name
- Sediminibacterium roseum Song et al. 2017

Type strain
- CCTCC AB 2017082, KCTC 52860, strain SYL130

Bacterium

Sediminibacterium roseum is a Gram-negative, aerobic and motile bacterium from the genus of Sediminibacterium which has been isolated from sewage sediments from Busan in Korea.
