= Niabella yanshanensis =

Scientific classification
- Domain: Bacteria
- Kingdom: Pseudomonadati
- Phylum: Bacteroidota
- Class: Chitinophagia
- Order: Chitinophagales
- Family: Chitinophagaceae
- Genus: Niabella
- Species: N. yanshanensis

Binomial name
- Niabella yanshanensis Wang et al. 2009

Type strain
- CCBAU 05354, HAMBI 3031, LMG 24661

Bacterium

Niabella yanshanensis is a Gram-negative, aerobic and non-motile bacterium from the genus of Niabella which has been isolated from the rhizosphere of a soybean plant from Hebei in China.
