= Niabella ginsenosidivorans =

Scientific classification
- Domain: Bacteria
- Kingdom: Pseudomonadati
- Phylum: Bacteroidota
- Class: Chitinophagia
- Order: Chitinophagales
- Family: Chitinophagaceae
- Genus: Niabella
- Species: N. ginsenosidivorans

Binomial name
- Niabella ginsenosidivorans Yi et al. 2019

Type strain
- JCM 18199, KACC 16620, strain BS26

Bacterium

Niabella ginsenosidivorans is a Gram-negative, strictly aerobic, rod-shaped and non-motile bacterium from the genus of Niabella which has been isolated from compost.
