= Terrimonas arctica =

Scientific classification
- Domain: Bacteria
- Kingdom: Pseudomonadati
- Phylum: Bacteroidota
- Class: Chitinophagia
- Order: Chitinophagales
- Family: Chitinophagaceae
- Genus: Terrimonas
- Species: T. arctica

Binomial name
- Terrimonas arctica Jiang et al. 2014

Type strain
- CCTCC AB 2011004, NRRL B-59114, strain R9-86

Bacterium

Terrimonas arctica is a Gram-negative, rod-shaped, aerobic and non-motile bacterium from the genus of Terrimonas which has been isolated from soil from the Arctic tundra from Norway.
