= Sediminibacterium aquarii =

Scientific classification
- Domain: Bacteria
- Kingdom: Pseudomonadati
- Phylum: Bacteroidota
- Class: Chitinophagia
- Order: Chitinophagales
- Family: Chitinophagaceae
- Genus: Sediminibacterium
- Species: S. aquarii

Binomial name
- Sediminibacterium aquarii Kim et al. 2016

Type strain
- JCM 31013, KACC 18509, strain AA5

Bacterium

Sediminibacterium aquarii is a Gram-negative, rod-shaped and strictly aerobic bacterium from the genus of Sediminibacterium which has been isolated from sediments from a fish bowl.
