= Ferruginibacter paludis =

Scientific classification
- Domain: Bacteria
- Kingdom: Pseudomonadati
- Phylum: Bacteroidota
- Class: Chitinophagia
- Order: Chitinophagales
- Family: Chitinophagaceae
- Genus: Ferruginibacter
- Species: F. paludis

Binomial name
- Ferruginibacter paludis Kang et al. 2015

Type strain
- CECT 8366, KCTC 42121, HME8881

Bacterium

Ferruginibacter paludis is a Gram-negative, aerobic and rod-shaped bacterium from the genus of Ferruginibacter which has been isolated from freshwater wetland from Korea.
