= Arachidicoccus rhizosphaerae =

Scientific classification
- Domain: Bacteria
- Kingdom: Pseudomonadati
- Phylum: Bacteroidota
- Class: Chitinophagia
- Order: Chitinophagales
- Family: Chitinophagaceae
- Genus: Arachidicoccus
- Species: A. rhizosphaerae

Binomial name
- Arachidicoccus rhizosphaerae Madhaiyan et al. 2015

Type strain
- Vu-144, Vu-35, Vu-7, KCTC 22378, NCIMB 14473

Bacterium

Arachidicoccus rhizosphaerae is a Gram-negative, plant-growth-promoting, non-spore-forming and non-motile bacterium from the genus Arachidicoccus which has been isolated from rhizospheric soil.
