= Taibaiella chishuiensis =

Scientific classification
- Domain: Bacteria
- Kingdom: Pseudomonadati
- Phylum: Bacteroidota
- Class: Chitinophagia
- Order: Chitinophagales
- Family: Chitinophagaceae
- Genus: Taibaiella
- Species: T. chishuiensis

Binomial name
- Taibaiella chishuiensis Tan et al. 2014

Type strain
- CGMCC 1.12700, JCM 19637, strain AY17

Bacterium

Taibaiella chishuiensis is a Gram-negative, rod-shaped, strictly aerobic and non-motile bacterium from the genus of Taibaiella which has been isolated from water from the Chishui River from Guizhou in China.
