= Filimonas aquilariae =

Scientific classification
- Domain: Bacteria
- Kingdom: Pseudomonadati
- Phylum: Bacteroidota
- Class: Chitinophagia
- Order: Chitinophagales
- Family: Chitinophagaceae
- Genus: Filimonas
- Species: F. aquilariae

Binomial name
- Filimonas aquilariae Lin et al. 2017

Type strain
- BCRC 80935, JCM 31197, CC-YHH650

Bacterium

Filimonas aquilariae is a Gram-negative, aerobic and rod-shaped bacterium from the genus of Filimonas which has been isolated from agarwood chips.
