= Niabella hibiscisoli =

Scientific classification
- Domain: Bacteria
- Kingdom: Pseudomonadati
- Phylum: Bacteroidota
- Class: Chitinophagia
- Order: Chitinophagales
- Family: Chitinophagaceae
- Genus: Niabella
- Species: N. hibiscisoli

Binomial name
- Niabella hibiscisoli Ngo et al. 2017

Type strain
- CCTCC AB 2016086, KACC 18857, THG-DN5.5

Bacterium

Niabella hibiscisoli is a Gram-negative, strictly aerobic, rod-shaped and non-motile bacterium from the genus of Niabella which has been isolated from soil from a Rose from the Sharon garden from Daejeon in Korea.
