= T. carboxydivorans =

T. carboxydivorans may refer to:

- Terrabacter carboxydivorans, a Gram-positive bacterium.
- Thermolithobacter carboxydivorans, a Gram-positive bacterium.
- Thermosinus carboxydivorans, a Gram-negative bacterium.
- Tsukamurella carboxydivorans, a Gram-positive bacterium.
