= Parasegetibacter =

Scientific classification
- Domain: Bacteria
- Kingdom: Pseudomonadati
- Phylum: Bacteroidota
- Class: Chitinophagia
- Order: Chitinophagales
- Family: Chitinophagaceae
- Genus: Parasediminibacterium; Zhang et al. 2009

Type species
- Parasegetibacter luojiensis

Species
- P. luojiensis P. terrae

Genus of bacteria

Parasegetibacter is a genus of bacteria from the family of Chitinophagaceae.
