= Filimonas lacunae =

Scientific classification
- Domain: Bacteria
- Kingdom: Pseudomonadati
- Phylum: Bacteroidota
- Class: Chitinophagia
- Order: Chitinophagales
- Family: Chitinophagaceae
- Genus: Filimonas
- Species: F. lacunae

Binomial name
- Filimonas lacunae Shiratori et al. 2009

Type strain
- DSM 21054, NBRC 104114, YT0021, YT21

Bacterium

Filimonas lacunae is a Gram-negative, aerobic and motile bacterium from the genus of Filimonas which has been isolated from fresh water from Japan.
