= Niabella aquatica =

Scientific classification
- Domain: Bacteria
- Kingdom: Pseudomonadati
- Phylum: Bacteroidota
- Class: Chitinophagia
- Order: Chitinophagales
- Family: Chitinophagaceae
- Genus: Niabella
- Species: N. aquatica

Binomial name
- Niabella aquatica Siddiqi and Im 2016

Type strain
- JCM 30952, KACC 18623, strain RP-2

Bacterium

Niabella aquatica is a Gram-negative, strictly aerobic, rod-shaped and non-motile bacterium from the genus of Niabella which has been isolated from lake water.
