= Flavisolibacter ginsengisoli =

Scientific classification
- Domain: Bacteria
- Kingdom: Pseudomonadati
- Phylum: Bacteroidota
- Class: Chitinophagia
- Order: Chitinophagales
- Family: Chitinophagaceae
- Genus: Flavisolibacter
- Species: F. ginsengisoli

Binomial name
- Flavisolibacter ginsengisoli Yoon and Im 2007

Type strain
- DSM 18119, KCTC 12657, Gsoil 643

Bacterium

Flavisolibacter ginsengisoli is a Gram-negative, rod-shaped, aerobic and non-motile bacterium from the genus of Flavisolibacter which has been isolated from soil from a ginseng field from Pocheon in Korea.
