= Flavitalea populi =

Scientific classification
- Domain: Bacteria
- Kingdom: Pseudomonadati
- Phylum: Bacteroidota
- Class: Chitinophagia
- Order: Chitinophagales
- Family: Chitinophagaceae
- Genus: Flavitalea
- Species: F. populi

Binomial name
- Flavitalea populi Wang et al. 2011

Type strain
- CCTCC AB 208255, HY-50R, NRRL B-59222

Synonyms
- Flavisolibacter populi

Bacterium

Flavitalea populi is a Gram-negative, rod-shaped, aerobic and non-motile bacterium from the genus of Flavitalea which has been isolated from soil from the plant Populus euphratica from a forest in Xinjiang in China.
