= Lacibacter daechungensis =

Scientific classification
- Domain: Bacteria
- Kingdom: Pseudomonadati
- Phylum: Bacteroidota
- Class: Chitinophagia
- Order: Chitinophagales
- Family: Chitinophagaceae
- Genus: Lacibacter
- Species: L. daechungensis

Binomial name
- Lacibacter daechungensis Jin et al. 2013

Type strain
- JCM 19172, KCTC 32395, strain H32-4

Bacterium

Lacibacter daechungensis is a Gram-negative, aerobic, rod-shaped, non-spore-forming and motile bacterium from the genus of Lacibacter which has been isolated from deep freshwater from the Daechung reservoir in Korea.
