= Niabella ginsengisoli =

Scientific classification
- Domain: Bacteria
- Kingdom: Pseudomonadati
- Phylum: Bacteroidota
- Class: Chitinophagia
- Order: Chitinophagales
- Family: Chitinophagaceae
- Genus: Niabella
- Species: N. ginsengisoli

Binomial name
- Niabella ginsengisoli Weon et al. 2009

Type strain
- JCM 15444, KACC 13021, strain GR10-1

Bacterium

Niabella ginsengisoli is a Gram-negative, obligately aerobic and non-motile bacterium from the genus of Niabella which has been isolated from a ginseng field .
