= Segetibacter aerophilus =

Scientific classification
- Domain: Bacteria
- Kingdom: Pseudomonadati
- Phylum: Bacteroidota
- Class: Chitinophagia
- Order: Chitinophagales
- Family: Chitinophagaceae
- Genus: Segetibacter
- Species: S. aerophilus

Binomial name
- Segetibacter aerophilus Weon et al. 2010

Type strain
- KACC 14119, NBRC 106135, strain 6424S-61

Bacterium

Segetibacter aerophilus is a Gram-negative, rod-shaped, strictly aerobic and non-spore-forming bacterium from the genus of Segetibacter which has been isolated from air.
