= Niastella populi =

Scientific classification
- Domain: Bacteria
- Kingdom: Pseudomonadati
- Phylum: Bacteroidota
- Class: Chitinophagia
- Order: Chitinophagales
- Family: Chitinophagaceae
- Genus: Niastella
- Species: N. populi

Binomial name
- Niastella populi Zhang et al. 2010

Type strain
- CCTCC AB 208238, KCTC 22560, THYL-44

Species of bacterium

Niastella populi is a Gram-negative, strictly aerobic and non-motile bacterium from the genus of Niastella which has been isolated out of soli from a Populus euphratica forest in Xinjiang in China.
