= Niabella tibetensis =

Scientific classification
- Domain: Bacteria
- Kingdom: Pseudomonadati
- Phylum: Bacteroidota
- Class: Chitinophagia
- Order: Chitinophagales
- Family: Chitinophagaceae
- Genus: Niabella
- Species: N. tibetensis

Binomial name
- Niabella tibetensis Dai et al. 2011

Type strain
- CCTCC AB 209167, NRRL B-59394, strain 15-4

Bacterium

Niabella tibetensis is a Gram-negative, rod-shaped and non-motile bacterium from the genus of Niabella which has been isolated from the Tibet Province in China.
