= Niabella drilacis =

Scientific classification
- Domain: Bacteria
- Kingdom: Pseudomonadati
- Phylum: Bacteroidota
- Class: Chitinophagia
- Order: Chitinophagales
- Family: Chitinophagaceae
- Genus: Niabella
- Species: N. drilacis

Binomial name
- Niabella drilacis Glaeser et al. 2013

Type strain
- CCM 8410, DSM 25811, LMG 26954, strain E90

Bacterium

Niabella drilacis is a Gram-negative and rod-shaped bacterium from the genus of Niabella which has been isolated from a leech (Hirudo verbana) from Biebertal in Germany.
