= Hydrotalea flava =

Scientific classification
- Domain: Bacteria
- Kingdom: Pseudomonadati
- Phylum: Bacteroidota
- Class: Chitinophagia
- Order: Chitinophagales
- Family: Chitinophagaceae
- Genus: Hydrotalea
- Species: H. flava

Binomial name
- Hydrotalea flava Kämpfer et al. 2011

Type strain
- CCM 7760, CCUG 51397, CCUG 53736, CCUG 53920

Bacterium

Hydrotalea flava is a bacterium from the genus of Hydrotalea which has been isolated from industry distilled water from Sweden.
