= Filimonas zeae =

Scientific classification
- Domain: Bacteria
- Kingdom: Pseudomonadati
- Phylum: Bacteroidota
- Class: Chitinophagia
- Order: Chitinophagales
- Family: Chitinophagaceae
- Genus: Filimonas
- Species: F. zeae

Binomial name
- Filimonas zeae Gao et al. 2016

Type strain
- CGMCC 1.15290, DSM 100760, strain 772

Bacterium

Filimonas zeae is a Gram-negative, aerobic and motile bacterium from the genus of Filimonas which has been isolated from the roots of a maize-plant from the Beijing in China.
