= Terrabacter terrae =

Scientific classification
- Domain: Bacteria
- Kingdom: Bacillati
- Phylum: Actinomycetota
- Class: Actinomycetes
- Order: Micrococcales
- Family: Intrasporangiaceae
- Genus: Terrabacter
- Species: T. terrae

Binomial name
- Terrabacter terrae Montero-Barrientos et al. 2005

Species of bacteria

Terrabacter terrae is a species of Gram-positive, nonmotile, non-endospore-forming bacteria. Cells are long, irregular rods. It was initially isolated from soil mixed with Iberian pig hair from Spain. The species was first described in 2005, and its name is derived from terrae (of the earth). The species was discovered during a survey for bacteria with keratinase activity. T. terrae was the second species added to the genus Terrabacter after the type species, T. tumescens, was added to the novel genus in 1989.

T. terrae can grow in the 15-40 °C range, and is able to hydrolyze keratin.
