= Terrimonas soli =

Scientific classification
- Domain: Bacteria
- Kingdom: Pseudomonadati
- Phylum: Bacteroidota
- Class: Chitinophagia
- Order: Chitinophagales
- Family: Chitinophagaceae
- Genus: Terrimonas
- Species: T. soli

Binomial name
- Terrimonas soli Jiang et al. 2018

Type strain
- CCTCC AB 2017059, JCM 32095, strain FL-8

Bacterium

Terrimonas soli is a Gram-negative, aerobic, rod-shaped and non-motile bacterium from the genus of Terrimonas which has been isolated from farmland soil from Chuzhou in China.
