= Compostibacter =

Scientific classification
- Domain: Bacteria
- Kingdom: Pseudomonadati
- Phylum: Bacteroidota
- Class: Chitinophagia
- Order: Chitinophagales
- Family: Chitinophagaceae
- Genus: Compostibacter; Siddiqi et al. 2016

Type species
- Compostibacter hankyongensis

Species
- C. hankyongensis

Genus of bacteria

Compostibacter is a genus of bacteria from the family of Chitinophagaceae with one known species (Compostibacter hankyongensis). Compostibacter hankyongensis has been isolated from compost.
