= Heliimonas =

Scientific classification
- Domain: Bacteria
- Kingdom: Pseudomonadati
- Phylum: Bacteroidota
- Class: Chitinophagia
- Order: Chitinophagales
- Family: Chitinophagaceae
- Genus: Heliimonas; Leandro et al. 2013

Type species
- Heliimonas saccharivorans

Species
- H. saccharivorans

Genus of bacteria

Heliimonas is a pleomorphic, aerobic and non-motile genus of gram-negative bacteria from the family of Chitinophagaceae with one known species (Heliimonas saccharivorans).
