= Filimonas =

Scientific classification
- Domain: Bacteria
- Kingdom: Pseudomonadati
- Phylum: Bacteroidota
- Class: Chitinophagia
- Order: Chitinophagales
- Family: Chitinophagaceae
- Genus: Filimonas; Shiratori et al. 2009

Type species
- Filimonas lacunae

Species
- F. aquilariae F. aurantiibacter F. endophytica F. lacunae F. zeae

Genus of bacteria

Filimonas is a genus of gram-negative bacteria from the family of Chitinophagaceae.
