= Cnuella =

Scientific classification
- Domain: Bacteria
- Kingdom: Pseudomonadati
- Phylum: Bacteroidota
- Class: Chitinophagia
- Order: Chitinophagales
- Family: Chitinophagaceae
- Genus: Cnuella; Zhao et al. 2014

Type species
- Cnuella takakiae

Species
- C. takakiae

Genus of bacteria

Cnuella is a genus of Gram-negative, rod-shaped and non-spore-forming bacteria from the family of Chitinophagaceae with one known species (Cnuella takakiae). Cnuella takakiae has been isolated from the moss Takakia lepidozioides from the Gawalong glacier in China.
