= Niveitalea =

Scientific classification
- Domain: Bacteria
- Kingdom: Pseudomonadati
- Phylum: Bacteroidota
- Class: Chitinophagia
- Order: Chitinophagales
- Family: Chitinophagaceae
- Genus: Niveitalea; Hyeon et al. 2017

Type species
- Niveitalea solisilvae

Species
- N. solisilvae

Genus of bacteria

Niveitalea is a Gram-negative, and strictly aerobic genus of bacteria from the family of Chitinophagaceae with one known species (Niveitalea solisilvae). Niveitalea solisilvae has been isolated from forest soil from Jeju Island in Korea.
