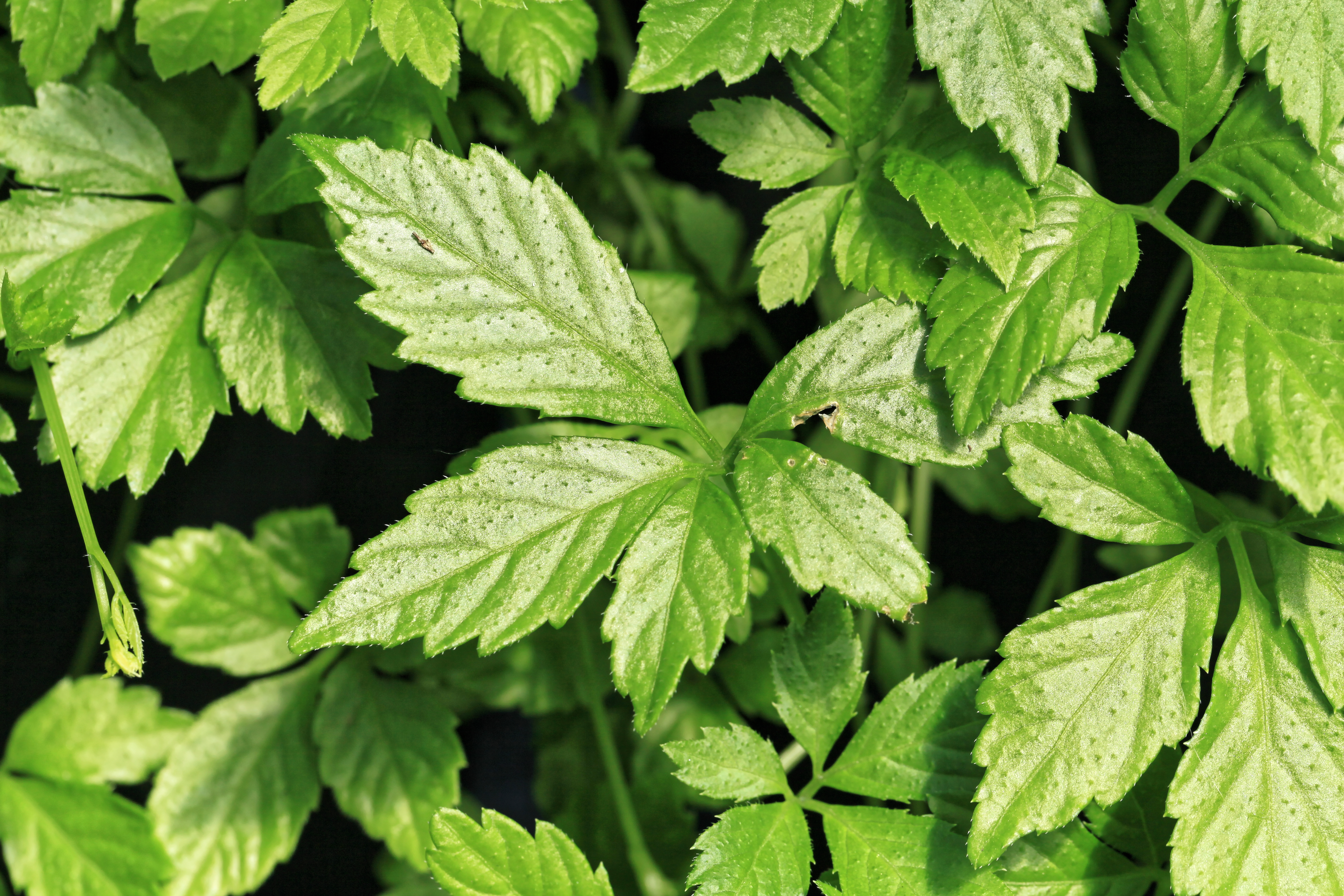

Scientific classification
- Kingdom: Plantae
- Clade: Embryophytes
- Clade: Tracheophytes
- Clade: Angiosperms
- Clade: Eudicots
- Clade: Rosids
- Order: Cucurbitales
- Family: Cucurbitaceae
- Genus: Gynostemma
- Species: G. pentaphyllum

Binomial name
- Gynostemma pentaphyllum (Thunb.) Makino 1902

= Gynostemma pentaphyllum =

Species of flowering plant

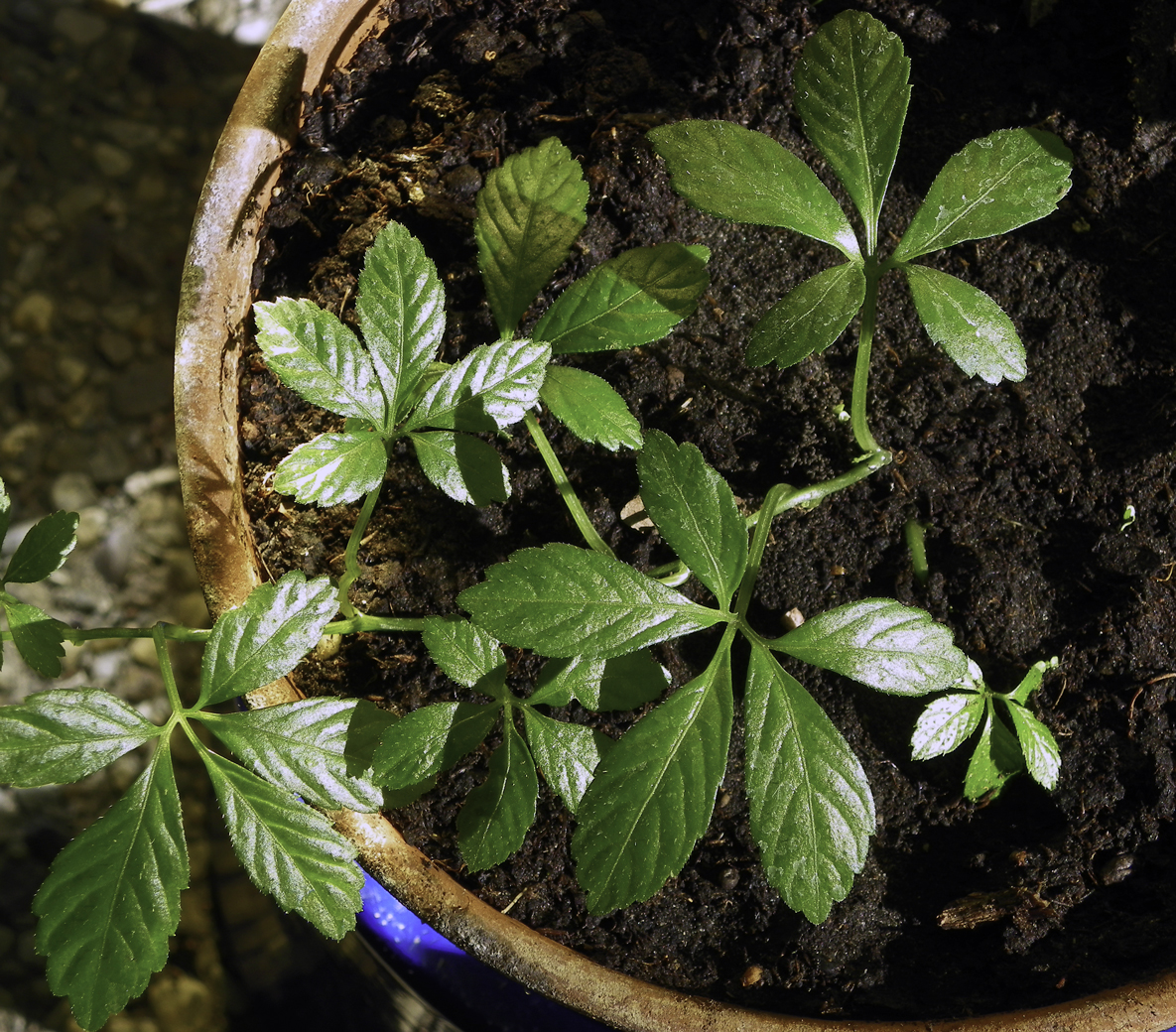
Young jiaogulan plant

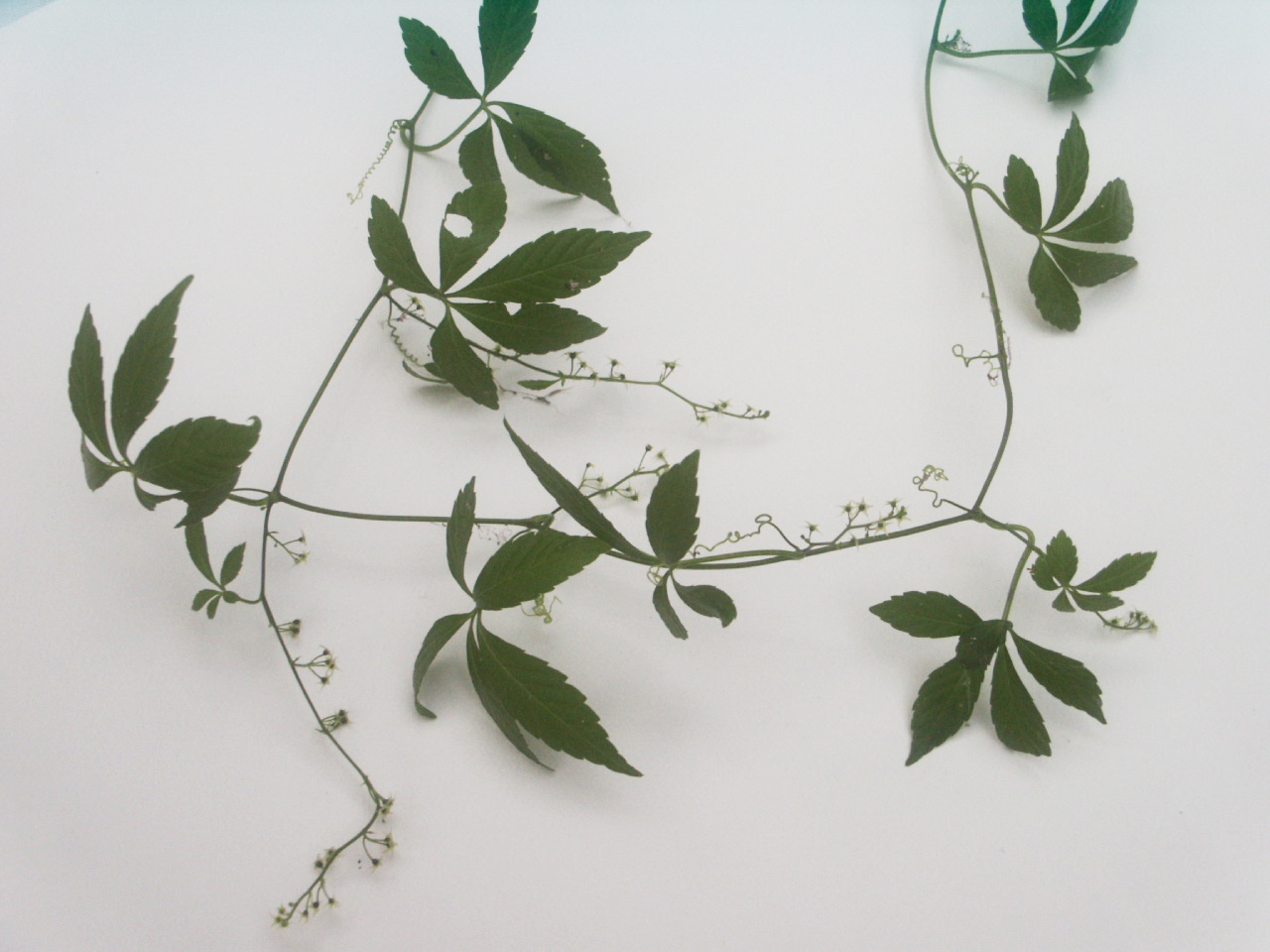
Jiaogulan vines with seeds

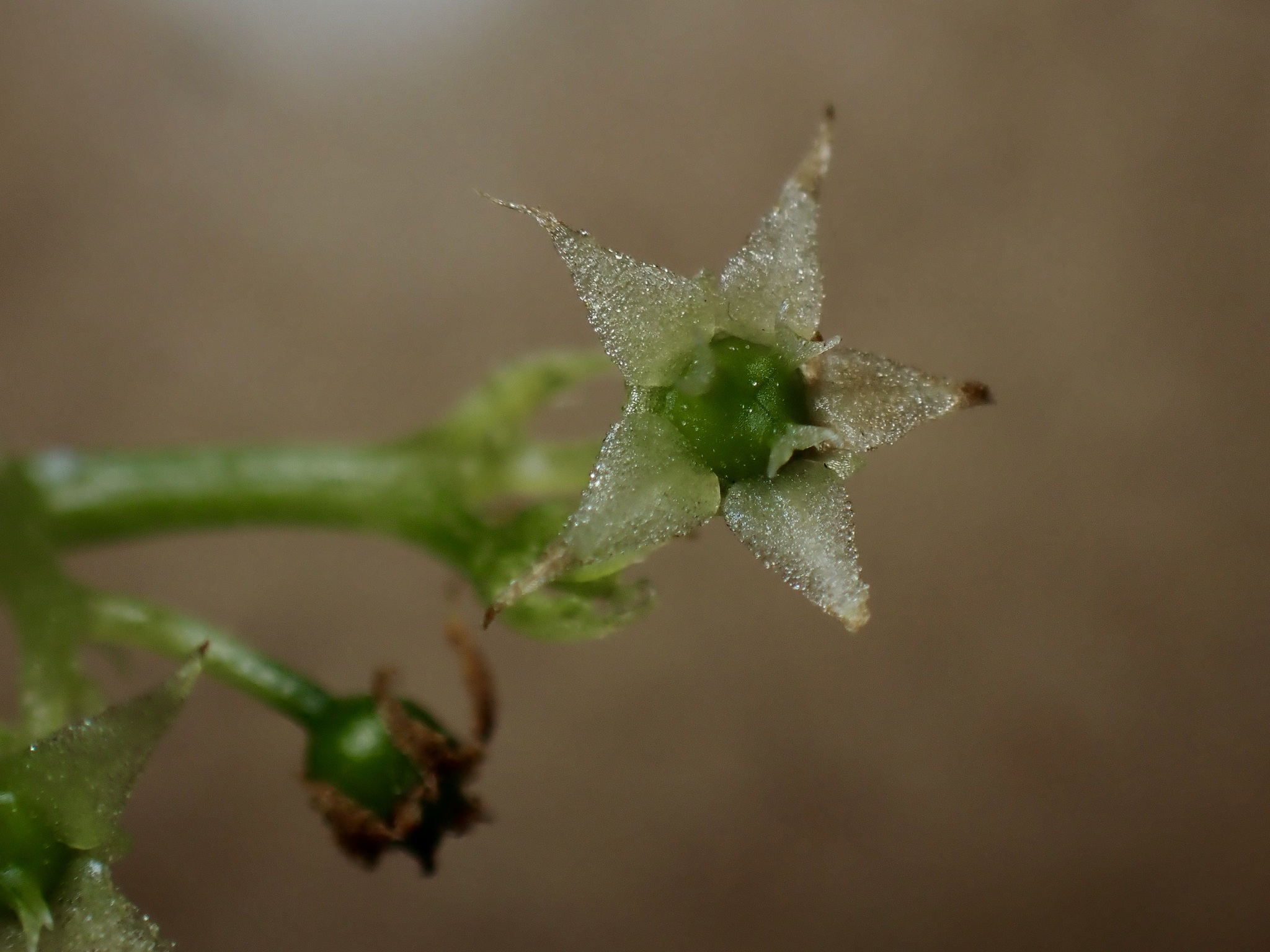
A female flower

Gynostemma pentaphyllum, also called jiaogulan (Chinese: 绞股蓝; pinyin: jiǎogǔlán; lit. 'twisting blue plant'), is a dioecious, herbaceous climbing vine of the family Cucurbitaceae (cucumber or gourd family) widely distributed in South and East Asia as well as New Guinea.

Jiaogulan is used to make a sweet tea and is applied in Chinese traditional medicine.

== Common names ==
Among many common names are five-leaf ginseng, poor man's ginseng, miracle grass, fairy herb, sweet tea vine, gospel herb, and southern ginseng.

Gynostemma pentaphyllum is known as jiaogulan (Chinese: 绞股蓝) in China.

== Description ==
Jiaogulan belongs to the genus Gynostemma, in the family Cucurbitaceae, which includes cucumbers, gourds, and melons. Its fruit is a small purple inedible gourd. It is a climbing vine, attaching itself to supports using tendrils. The serrated leaflets commonly grow in groups of five (as in G. pentaphyllum) although some species can have groups of three or seven leaflets. The plant is dioecious, meaning each plant exists either as male or female. Therefore, if seeds are desired, both a male and female plant must be grown.

Jiaogulan grows avidly in the wild, is cultivated, and occurs naturalized in dry regions of the United States.

== Taxonomy ==
The plant was first described in 1406 CE by Zhu Xiao, who presented a description and sketch in the book Materia Medica for Famine as a famine food rather than a herb. The earliest record of jiaogulan's use comes from herbalist Li Shizhen's book Compendium of Materia Medica published in 1578, identifying jiaogulan supposedly for treating various ailments. While Li Shizhen had confused jiaogulan with an analogous herb, wulianmei, in 1848 Wu Qi-Jun rectified this confusion in Textual Investigation of Herbal Plants.

== Phytochemicals ==
Modern recognition of the plant outside of China originated from research in sugar substitutes.

Jiaogulan (especially the leaves) contains several dammarane-type saponins. Some of them have structures identical to the ginsenosides found in ginseng, specifically ginsenosides Rb1, Rb3, F2, Rg3, Rc, Rd, malonyl-Rb1, and malonyl-Rd. The rest are closely related to the ginsenosides; being discovered in Gynostemma, they are customarily named as gypenosides. Hydrolysis of these saponins by heat treatment yields some rare ginsenosides, which are economically valuable.

There are also some cucurbitane-type saponins. Other terpenoid constituents include sterols and triterpenols. The stems and leaves also contain polysaccharides and flavonoids.

Some gypenosides are sweet-tasting, with one being 200 times as sweet as sucrose. Some other gypenosides are bitter-tasting. Both contribute to the taste of the plant.

While there have been in vitro studies on toxicity, there have been no clinical trials providing high-quality clinical evidence about its efficacy and safety; no information exists about human toxicity.

== Distribution and habitat ==
G. pentaphyllum is one of about 17 species in the genus Gynostemma, including nine species endemic to China. However, G. pentaphyllum has a wide distribution outside of China, ranging from India and Bangladesh to Southeast Asia to Japan and Korea as well as to New Guinea. In China, it grows in forests, thickets, and roadsides on mountain slopes at elevations of 300–3,200 m (980–10,500 ft) above sea level.

Jiaogulan is a vine hardy to USDA zone 8 in which it may grow as a short lived perennial plant. It can be grown as an annual in most temperate climates, in well-drained soil with full sun. It does not grow well in cold climates with temperatures below freezing.

== Uses ==
The plant is used in folk medicine, typically as a herbal tea, but may be used as an alcohol extract or in dietary supplements. It has not seen widespread use in traditional Chinese medicine, being adopted only in the past 20 years, and grows mainly in Guizhou province.

In the European Union, jiaogulan is considered a novel food following a 2012 court ruling that prohibited its sale as food.

== Research ==
Some limited research has assessed the potential for jiaogulan to affect such disorders as cardiovascular diseases, hyperlipidemia, or type 2 diabetes, but these studies were too preliminary to allow any conclusion that it was beneficial.
