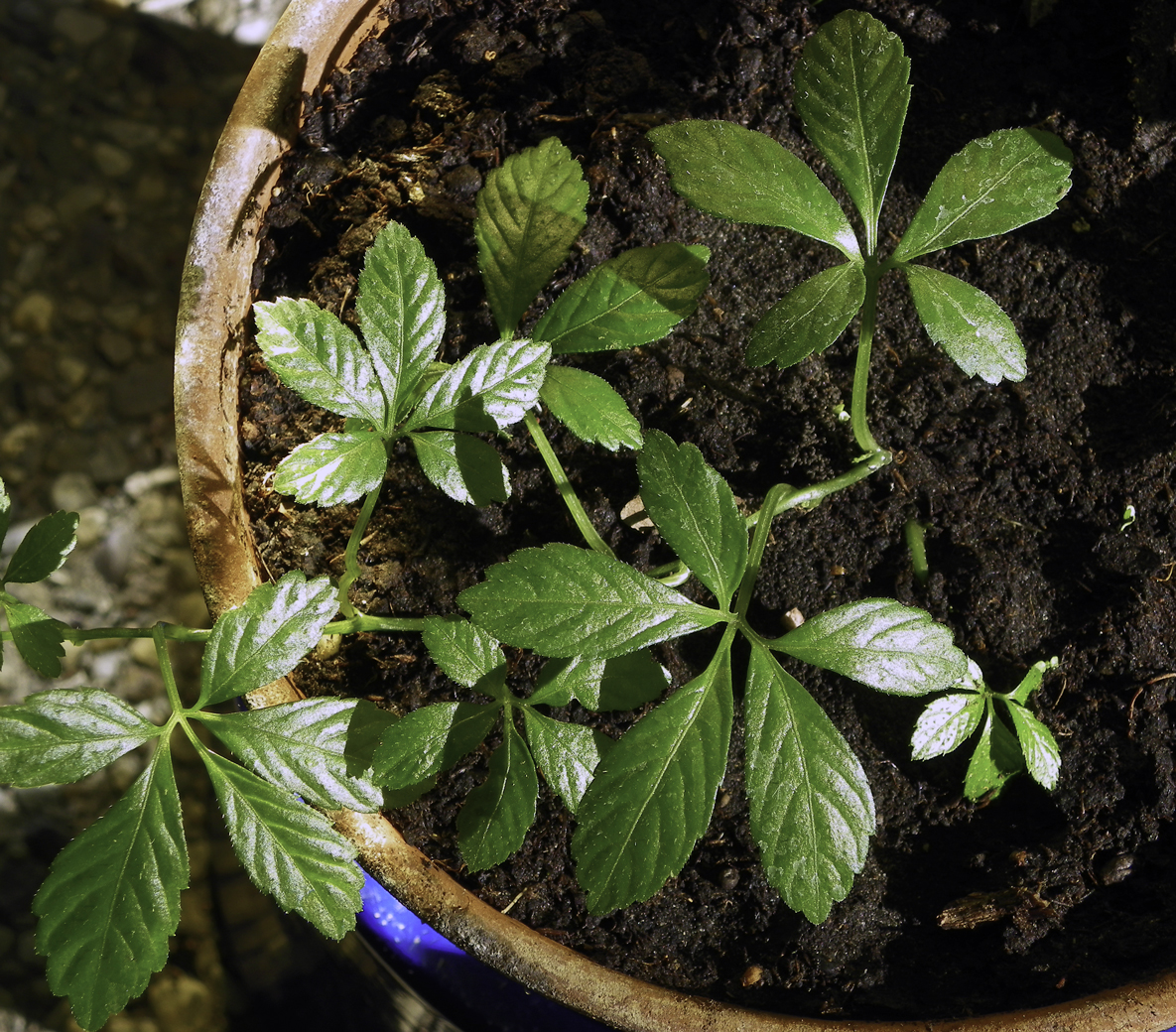
- Gynostemma pentaphyllum growing in potting soil

Scientific classification
- Kingdom: Plantae
- Clade: Embryophytes
- Clade: Tracheophytes
- Clade: Angiosperms
- Clade: Eudicots
- Clade: Rosids
- Order: Cucurbitales
- Family: Cucurbitaceae
- Tribe: Gomphogyneae
- Genus: Gynostemma; Blume

Species
- See text

= Gynostemma =

Genus of flowering plants

Gynostemma is a genus of perennial climbing vines in the cucumber, gourd, and melon family, comprising at least 19 species, all native to the tropical East or Far East, inclusive of the Himalayas: China (with 9 endemic); the islands of Japan; Malaysia; and New Guinea. The term Gynostemma is derived from Ancient Greek γυνή meaning "woman" or "female", and στέμμα meaning "wreath" or "garland". In (post-)classical Latin the form stemma is attested as Greek loanword. In Ancient Greek and Latin, stemma is of neuter gender. German-Dutch botanist Carl Ludwig Blume described Gynostemma from two species he named: G. pedata (later changed, to pedatum) and G. simplicifolia (also later changed, to simplicifolium). Neither species was clearly designated by him as the type; however, the former species, G. pedatum is now considered to be a synonym of G. pentaphyllum (Thunb.) Makino. The genus was published in 1825, in Carl Ludwig von Blume's Bijdragen tot de flora van Nederlandsch Indië ("Contributions to the flora of the Dutch East Indies").

== General description ==
All species of Gynostemma have tendrils (usually branching); most are dioecious. The leaves are usually in palmately arrayed leaflets (3–9, ovate-lanceolate in shape), arranged alternately on the stem; a few species are leaved, but without leaflets. Inflorescences are either racemose or paniculate. Fruits can be capsular or pea-like, containing two or three seeds.

== Selected species ==
- Gynostemma aggregatum C.Y.Wu & S.K.Chen
- Gynostemma burmanicum King ex Chakrav.
- Gynostemma cardiospermum Cogn. ex Oliv.
- Gynostemma caulopterum S.Z.He
- Gynostemma compressum X.X.Chen & D.R.Liang
- Gynostemma guangxiense X.X.Chen & D.H.Qin
- Gynostemma intermedium W.J.de Wilde & Duyfjes
- Gynostemma laxiflorum C.Y.Wu & S.K.Chen
- Gynostemma laxum (Wall.) Cogn.
- Gynostemma longipes C.Y.Wu
- Gynostemma microspermum C.Y.Wu & S.K.Chen
- Gynostemma pallidinervee Z.Zhang
- Gynostemma papuanum W.J.de Wilde & Duyfjes
- Gynostemma pentagynum Z.P.Wang
- Gynostemma pentaphyllum (Thunb.) Makino
- Gynostemma pubescens (Gagnep.) C.Y.Wu
- Gynostemma simplicifolium Blume
- Gynostemma yixingense (Z.P.Wang & Q.Z.Xie) C.Y.Wu & S.K.Chen
- Gynostemma zhejiangense X.J.Xue

List source :
