= Terrabacter lapilli =

Scientific classification
- Domain: Bacteria
- Kingdom: Bacillati
- Phylum: Actinomycetota
- Class: Actinomycetes
- Order: Micrococcales
- Family: Intrasporangiaceae
- Genus: Terrabacter
- Species: T. lapilli

Binomial name
- Terrabacter lapilli Lee et al. 2008

Species of bacteria

Terrabacter lapilli is a species of Gram-positive, nonmotile, non-endospore-forming bacteria. Cells are short rods. It was initially isolated from a small stone from an agricultural field in Jeju Province, South Korea. The species was first described in 2008, and its name is derived from Latin lapilli (of a small stone).

T. lapilli can grow in the 10-40 °C range and in pH 4.1-12.1.
