= Niastella =

Scientific classification
- Domain: Bacteria
- Kingdom: Pseudomonadati
- Phylum: Bacteroidota
- Class: Chitinophagia
- Order: Chitinophagales
- Family: Chitinophagaceae
- Genus: Niastella; Weon et al. 2006

Type species
- Niastella koreensis

Species
- N. gongjuensis N. koreensis N. populi N. vici N. yeongjuensis

Genus of bacteria

Niastella is a bacterial genus from the family of Chitinophagaceae.
