= Agriterribacter =

Scientific classification
- Domain: Bacteria
- Kingdom: Pseudomonadati
- Phylum: Bacteroidota
- Class: Chitinophagia
- Order: Chitinophagales
- Family: Chitinophagaceae
- Genus: Agriterribacter; Lee and Whang 2020
- Species: A. humi

Binomial name
- Agriterribacter humi Lee and Whang 2020

Genus of bacteria

Agriterribacter is a Gram-negative, aerobic, non-spore-forming and non-motile genus of bacteria from the family of Chitinophagaceae with one known species (Agriterribacter humi).
