= Puia (bacterium) =

Scientific classification
- Domain: Bacteria
- Kingdom: Pseudomonadati
- Phylum: Bacteroidota
- Class: Chitinophagia
- Order: Chitinophagales
- Family: Chitinophagaceae
- Genus: Puia; Lv et al. 2017

Type species
- Puia dinghuensis

Species
- P. dinghuensis

Genus of bacteria

Puia is a Gram-negative, aerobic, rod-shaped and non-motile genus of bacteria from the family of Chitinophagaceae with one known species (Puia dinghuensis). Puia dinghuensis has been isolated from forest soil from the Dinghushan Biosphere Reserve in China.
