= Taibaiella soli =

Scientific classification
- Domain: Bacteria
- Kingdom: Pseudomonadati
- Phylum: Bacteroidota
- Class: Chitinophagia
- Order: Chitinophagales
- Family: Chitinophagaceae
- Genus: Taibaiella
- Species: T. soli

Binomial name
- Taibaiella soli Kim et al. 2016

Type strain
- JCM 31014, KCTC 42277, strain T1-10

Bacterium

Taibaiella soli is a Gram-negative, oval-shaped, non-spore-forming and motile bacterium from the genus of Taibaiella which has been isolated from soil from a pine forest.
