= Niabella =

Scientific classification
- Domain: Bacteria
- Kingdom: Pseudomonadati
- Phylum: Bacteroidota
- Class: Chitinophagia
- Order: Chitinophagales
- Family: Chitinophagaceae
- Genus: Niabella; Kim et al. 2007

Type species
- Niabella aurantiaca

Species
- N. aquatica N. aurantiaca N. drilacis N. ginsenosidivorans N. ginsengisoli N. hibiscisoli N. hirudinis N. pedocola N. soli N. tibetensis N. yanshanensis

Genus of bacteria

Niabella is a genus of bacteria from the family of Chitinophagaceae.
