= Taibaiella =

Scientific classification
- Domain: Bacteria
- Kingdom: Pseudomonadati
- Phylum: Bacteroidota
- Class: Chitinophagia
- Order: Chitinophagales
- Family: Chitinophagaceae
- Genus: Taibaiella; Zhang et al. 2013

Type species
- Taibaiella smilacinae

Species
- T. chishuiensis T. coffeisoli T. koreensis T. helva T. smilacinae T. soli T. yonginensis

Genus of bacteria

Taibaiella is a genus of gram-negative bacteria from the family of Chitinophagaceae.
