= Arachidicoccus =

Scientific classification
- Domain: Bacteria
- Kingdom: Pseudomonadati
- Phylum: Bacteroidota
- Class: Chitinophagia
- Order: Chitinophagales
- Family: Chitinophagaceae
- Genus: Arachidicoccus; Madhaiyan et al. 2015

Type species
- Arachidicoccus rhizosphaerae

Species
- Arachidicoccus ginsenosidivorans Arachidicoccus rhizosphaerae Arachidicoccus soli

Genus of bacteria

Arachidicoccus is a genus of gram-negative bacteria from the family Chitinophagaceae.
