= Thermoflavifilum =

Scientific classification
- Domain: Bacteria
- Kingdom: Pseudomonadati
- Phylum: Bacteroidota
- Class: Chitinophagia
- Order: Chitinophagales
- Family: Chitinophagaceae
- Genus: Thermoflavifilum; Anders et al. 2014

Type species
- Thermoflavifilum aggregans

Species
- T. aggregans Anders et al. 2014; T. thermophilum (Hanada et al. 2014) García-López et al. 2020

Synonyms
- Crenotalea Hanada et al. 2014

Genus of bacteria

Thermoflavifilum is a strictly aerobic, moderately acidophilic and non-spore-forming genus of bacteria from the family Chitinophagaceae with one known species (Thermoflavifilum aggregans). Thermoflavifilum aggregans has been isolated from soil from the Waikite Valley Thermal Pools in New Zealand.
