= Paracnuella =

Scientific classification
- Domain: Bacteria
- Kingdom: Pseudomonadati
- Phylum: Bacteroidota
- Class: Chitinophagia
- Order: Chitinophagales
- Family: Chitinophagaceae
- Genus: Paracnuella; Wang et al. 2019

Species
- P. aquatica

Genus of bacteria

Paracnuella is a Gram-negative, rod-shaped and motile genus of bacteria from the family of Chitinophagaceae with one known species (Paracnuella aquatica). Paracnuella aquatica has been isolated from water from a thermal spring in China.
