= Mucibacter =

Scientific classification
- Domain: Bacteria
- Kingdom: Pseudomonadati
- Phylum: Bacteroidota
- Class: Chitinophagia
- Order: Chitinophagales
- Family: Chitinophagaceae
- Genus: Mucibacter; Kim et al. 2020

Species
- M. soli

Genus of bacteria

Mucibacter is a Gram-negative, non-spore-forming, short-rod-shaped and motile genus of bacteria from the family of Chitinophagaceae with one known species (Mucibacter soli). Mucibacter soli produces mucin.
