= Terrimonas =

Scientific classification
- Domain: Bacteria
- Kingdom: Pseudomonadati
- Phylum: Bacteroidota
- Class: Chitinophagia
- Order: Chitinophagales
- Family: Chitinophagaceae
- Genus: Terrimonas; Xie and Yokota 2006

Type species
- Terrimonas ferruginea

Species
- T. aquatica T. arctica T. crocea T. ferruginea T. lutea T. pekingensis T. rhizosphaerae T. rubra T. suqianensis T. soli T. terrae

Synonyms
- Imcbia

Genus of bacteria

Terrimonas is a Gram-negative, aerobic and non-motile genus of bacteria from the family of Chitinophagaceae.
