= Aurantisolimonas =

Scientific classification
- Domain: Bacteria
- Kingdom: Pseudomonadati
- Phylum: Bacteroidota
- Class: Chitinophagia
- Order: Chitinophagales
- Family: Chitinophagaceae
- Genus: Aurantisolimonas; Liu et al. 2018

Type species
- Aurantisolimonas haloimpatiens

Species
- A. haloimpatiens

Genus of bacteria

Aurantisolimonas is a Gram-negative, strictly aerobic and non-motile genus of bacteria from the family of Chitinophagaceae with one known species (Aurantisolimonas haloimpatiens). Aurantisolimonas haloimpatiens has been isolated from soil from Gyeongsangbuk-do in Korea.
