= Paraflavitalea =

Scientific classification
- Domain: Bacteria
- Kingdom: Pseudomonadati
- Phylum: Bacteroidota
- Class: Chitinophagia
- Order: Chitinophagales
- Family: Chitinophagaceae
- Genus: Paraflavitalea; Heo et al. 2020

Species
- P. soli

Genus of bacteria

Paraflavitalea is a Gram-negative, strictly aerobic and motile genus of bacteria from the family of Chitinophagaceae with one known species (Paraflavitalea soli). Paraflavitalea soli has been isolated from greenhouse soil from Yongin in Korea.
