= Flaviaesturariibacter =

Scientific classification
- Domain: Bacteria
- Kingdom: Pseudomonadati
- Phylum: Bacteroidota
- Class: Chitinophagia
- Order: Chitinophagales
- Family: Chitinophagaceae
- Genus: Flaviaesturariibacter; Kang et al. 2015

Type species
- Flaviaesturariibacter amylovorans

Species
- F. amylovorans F. flavus F. luteus F. terrae

Synonyms
- Flavaestuariibacter

Genus of bacteria

Flaviaesturariibacter is a genus of gram-negative bacteria from the family of Chitinophagaceae.
