= Hydrobacter =

Scientific classification
- Domain: Bacteria
- Kingdom: Pseudomonadati
- Phylum: Bacteroidota
- Class: Chitinophagia
- Order: Chitinophagales
- Family: Chitinophagaceae
- Genus: Hydrobacter; Eder et al. 2015

Type species
- Hydrobacter penzbergensis

Species
- H. penzbergensis

Genus of bacteria

Hydrobacter is a Gram-negative genus of bacteria from the family of Chitinophagaceae with one known species (Hydrobacter penzbergensis). Hydrobacter penzbergensis has been isolated from a purified water system from Roche Diagnostics GmbH in Penzberg in Germany.
