= Gynurincola =

Scientific classification
- Domain: Bacteria
- Kingdom: Pseudomonadati
- Phylum: Bacteroidota
- Class: Chitinophagia
- Order: Chitinophagales
- Family: Chitinophagaceae
- Genus: Gynurincola; Zhang et al. 2019

Species
- G. endophyticus

Genus of bacteria

Gynurincola is a Gram-negative, rod-shaped and endophytic genus of bacteria from the family of Chitinophagaceae with one known species (Gynurincola endophyticus). Gynurincola endophyticus has been isolated from the stem of the plant Gynura bicolor from Pixian in China.
