= Parafilimonas =

Scientific classification
- Domain: Bacteria
- Kingdom: Pseudomonadati
- Phylum: Bacteroidota
- Class: Chitinophagia
- Order: Chitinophagales
- Family: Chitinophagaceae
- Genus: Parafilimonas; Kim et al. 2014

Type species
- Parafilimonas terrae

Species
- P. rhizosphaerae P. terrae

Genus of bacteria

Parafilimonas is a genus of gram-negative bacteria from the family of Chitinophagaceae. As of 2026, the genus contains 2 validly published species.
