= Ferruginibacter =

Scientific classification
- Domain: Bacteria
- Kingdom: Pseudomonadati
- Phylum: Bacteroidota
- Class: Chitinophagia
- Order: Chitinophagales
- Family: Chitinophagaceae
- Genus: Ferruginibacter; Lim et al. 2009

Type species
- Ferruginibacter alkalilentus

Species
- F. alkalilentus F. lapsinanis F. paludis F. yonginensis

Genus of bacteria

Ferruginibacter is a genus of gram-negative bacteria from the family of Chitinophagaceae.
