= Parapseudoflavitalea =

Scientific classification
- Domain: Bacteria
- Kingdom: Pseudomonadati
- Phylum: Bacteroidota
- Class: Chitinophagia
- Order: Chitinophagales
- Family: Chitinophagaceae
- Genus: Parapseudoflavitalea; Lawson et al. 2020

Species
- P. muciniphila

Genus of bacteria

Parapseudoflavitalea is a Gram-negative, rod-shaped, microaerophilic non-motile genus of bacteria from the family of Chitinophagaceae with one known species (Parapseudoflavitalea muciniphila). Parapseudoflavitalea muciniphila has been isolated from a peritoneal tumour of a human.
