= Flavihumibacter =

Scientific classification
- Domain: Bacteria
- Kingdom: Pseudomonadati
- Phylum: Bacteroidota
- Class: Chitinophagia
- Order: Chitinophagales
- Family: Chitinophagaceae
- Genus: Flavihumibacter; Zhang et al. 2010

Type species
- Flavihumibacter petaseus

Species
- F. cheonanensis F. petaseus F. sediminis F. solisilvae F. stibioxidans

Genus of bacteria

Edaphobaculum is a genus of gram-negative bacteria from the family of Chitinophagaceae.
