= Haoranjiania =

Scientific classification
- Domain: Bacteria
- Kingdom: Pseudomonadati
- Phylum: Bacteroidota
- Class: Chitinophagia
- Order: Chitinophagales
- Family: Chitinophagaceae
- Genus: Haoranjiania; Zhang et al. 2016

Type species
- Haoranjiania flava

Species
- H. flava

Genus of bacteria

Haoranjiania is a Gram-negative and non-spore-forming genus of bacteria from the family of Chitinophagaceae with one known species (Haoranjiania flava). Haoranjiania flava has been isolated from activated sludge from a pesticide factory from Xinyi in China.
