= Flavisolibacter =

Scientific classification
- Domain: Bacteria
- Kingdom: Pseudomonadati
- Phylum: Bacteroidota
- Class: Chitinophagia
- Order: Chitinophagales
- Family: Chitinophagaceae
- Genus: Flavisolibacter; Yoon and Im 2007

Type species
- Flavisolibacter ginsengiterrae

Species
- F. ginsengisoli F. ginsengiterrae F. ginsenosidimutans F. metallilatus F. rigui F. tropicus

Synonyms
- Flavosolibacter

Genus of bacteria

Flavisolibacter is a genus of gram-negative bacteria from the family of Chitinophagaceae.
