= Taibaiella koreensis =

Scientific classification
- Domain: Bacteria
- Kingdom: Pseudomonadati
- Phylum: Bacteroidota
- Class: Chitinophagia
- Order: Chitinophagales
- Family: Chitinophagaceae
- Genus: Taibaiella
- Species: T. koreensis

Binomial name
- Taibaiella koreensis Son et al. 2014

Type strain
- JCM 18823, KACC 17171, THG-DT86

Bacterium

Taibaiella koreensis is a Gram-negative, rod-shaped, strictly aerobic, non-spore-forming and non-motile bacterium from the genus of Taibaiella which has been isolated from soil from a ginseng field from Pocheon in Korea.
