= Rurimicrobium =

Scientific classification
- Domain: Bacteria
- Kingdom: Pseudomonadati
- Phylum: Bacteroidota
- Class: Chitinophagia
- Order: Chitinophagales
- Family: Chitinophagaceae
- Genus: Rurimicrobium; Dahal et al. 2017

Type species
- Rurimicrobium arvi

Species
- R. arvi

Genus of bacteria

Rurimicrobium is a Gram-negative, aerobic, non-spore-forming and non-motile genus of bacteria from the family of Chitinophagaceae with one known species (Rurimicrobium arvi). Rurimicrobium arvi has beenisolated from farmland soil.
