= Pseudobacter =

Scientific classification
- Domain: Bacteria
- Kingdom: Pseudomonadati
- Phylum: Bacteroidota
- Class: Chitinophagia
- Order: Chitinophagales
- Family: Chitinophagaceae
- Genus: Pseudobacter; Siddiqi and Im 2016

Type species
- Pseudobacter ginsenosidimutans

Species
- P. ginsenosidimutans

Genus of bacteria

Pseudobacter is a Gram-negative, pseudo-rod and non-spore-forming genus of bacteria from the family of Chitinophagaceae with one known species (Pseudobacter ginsenosidimutans ). Pseudobacter ginsenosidimutans has been isolated from soil from a ginseng field from Korea.
