= Pseudoflavitalea =

Scientific classification
- Domain: Bacteria
- Kingdom: Pseudomonadati
- Phylum: Bacteroidota
- Class: Chitinophagia
- Order: Chitinophagales
- Family: Chitinophagaceae
- Genus: Pseudoflavitalea; Kim et al. 2016

Type species
- Pseudoflavitalea rhizosphaerae

Species
- P. rhizosphaerae P. soli

Genus of bacteria

Pseudoflavitalea is a genus of gram-negative bacteria from the family of Chitinophagaceae.
