= Terrabacter terrigena =

Scientific classification
- Domain: Bacteria
- Kingdom: Bacillati
- Phylum: Actinomycetota
- Class: Actinomycetes
- Order: Micrococcales
- Family: Intrasporangiaceae
- Genus: Terrabacter
- Species: T. terrigena

Binomial name
- Terrabacter terrigena Yoon et al. 2009

Species of bacteria

Terrabacter terrigena is a species of Gram-positive, nonmotile, non-endospore-forming bacteria. Cells are rod-shaped. It was initially isolated from soil from around a wastewater treatment plant in South Korea. The species was first described in 2009, and its name is derived from Latin terrigena (child of the earth, earth-born) referring to the isolation of the type strain from soil.

The optimum growth temperature for T. terrigena is 30 °C and can grow in the 10-37 °C range. The optimum pH is 6.5-7.0 and can grow in pH 5.0-8.5.
