= Lacibacter =

Scientific classification
- Domain: Bacteria
- Kingdom: Pseudomonadati
- Phylum: Bacteroidota
- Class: Chitinophagia
- Order: Chitinophagales
- Family: Chitinophagaceae
- Genus: Lacibacter; Qu et al. 2009

Type species
- Lacibacter cauensis

Species
- L. cauensis L. daechungensis L. nakdongensis

Genus of bacteria

Lacibacter is a genus of gram-negative bacteria from the family of Chitinophagaceae.
