= Dinghuibacter =

Scientific classification
- Domain: Bacteria
- Kingdom: Pseudomonadati
- Phylum: Bacteroidota
- Class: Chitinophagia
- Order: Chitinophagales
- Family: Chitinophagaceae
- Genus: Dinghuibacter; Lv et al. 2016

Type species
- Dinghuibacter silviterrae

Species
- D. silviterrae

Genus of bacteria

Dinghuibacter is a Gram-negative, aerobic, rod-shaped and non-motile genus of bacteria from the family of Chitinophagaceae with one known species (Dinghuibacter silviterrae). Dinghuibacter silviterrae has been isolated from forest soil from the Dinghushan Biosphere Reserve in China.
