= Nemorincola =

Scientific classification
- Domain: Bacteria
- Kingdom: Pseudomonadati
- Phylum: Bacteroidota
- Class: Chitinophagia
- Order: Chitinophagales
- Family: Chitinophagaceae
- Genus: Nemorincola; Chaudhary et al. 2018

Type species
- Nemorincola caseinilytica

Species
- N. caseinilytica

Synonyms
- Nemorella Chaudhary et al. 2018

Genus of bacteria

Nemorincola is a Gram-negative, strictly aerobic, rod-shaped and non-motile genus of bacteria from the family of Chitinophagaceae with one known species (Nemorincola caseinilytica). Nemorella caseinilytica has been isolated from forest soil.
