= Arvibacter =

Scientific classification
- Domain: Bacteria
- Kingdom: Pseudomonadati
- Phylum: Bacteroidota
- Class: Chitinophagia
- Order: Chitinophagales
- Family: Chitinophagaceae
- Genus: Arvibacter; Chaudhary and Kim 2016

Type species
- *Arvibacter flaviflagrans Chaudhary and Kim 2016

Species
- Arvibacter aurantiibacter (Albert et al. 2016) Wang et al. 2019; Arvibacter flaviflagrans Chaudhary and Kim 2016

Genus of bacteria

Arvibacter is a Gram-negative, aerobic, rod-shaped and motile genus of bacteria from the family of Chitinophagaceae with one known species (Arvibacter flaviflagrans). Arvibacter flaviflagrans has been isolated from forest soil from the Kyonggi University in Korea.
