= Segetibacter =

Scientific classification
- Domain: Bacteria
- Kingdom: Pseudomonadati
- Phylum: Bacteroidota
- Class: Chitinophagia
- Order: Chitinophagales
- Family: Chitinophagaceae
- Genus: Segetibacter; An et al. 2007

Type species
- Segetibacter koreensis

Species
- S. aerophilus S. koreensis

Genus of bacteria

Segetibacter is a genus of gram-negative bacteria from the family of Chitinophagaceae.
