= Deminuibacter =

Scientific classification
- Domain: Bacteria
- Kingdom: Pseudomonadati
- Phylum: Bacteroidota
- Class: Chitinophagia
- Order: Chitinophagales
- Family: Chitinophagaceae
- Genus: Deminuibacter; Wang et al. 2019

Species
- D. soli

Genus of bacteria

Deminuibacter is a Gram-negative, aerobic and motile genus of bacteria from the family of Chitinophagaceae with one known species (Deminuibacter soli). Deminuibacter soli has been isolated from forest soil from the Dinghushan Biosphere Reserve in China.
