= Terrimonas terrae =

Scientific classification
- Domain: Bacteria
- Kingdom: Pseudomonadati
- Phylum: Bacteroidota
- Class: Chitinophagia
- Order: Chitinophagales
- Family: Chitinophagaceae
- Genus: Terrimonas
- Species: T. terrae

Binomial name
- Terrimonas terrae Kim et al. 2017

Type strain
- JCM 31603, KACC 18787, T16R-129

Bacterium

Terrimonas terrae is a Gram-negative, aerobic, rod-shaped and non-motile bacterium from the genus of Terrimonas which has been isolated from the rhizosphere of a tomato plant from Buyeo-gun in Korea.
