= Terrabacter aeriphilus =

Scientific classification
- Domain: Bacteria
- Kingdom: Bacillati
- Phylum: Actinomycetota
- Class: Actinomycetes
- Order: Micrococcales
- Family: Intrasporangiaceae
- Genus: Terrabacter
- Species: T. aeriphilus

Binomial name
- Terrabacter aeriphilus Weon et al. 2010

Species of bacteria

Terrabacter aeriphilus is a species of Gram-positive, nonmotile, non-endospore-forming bacteria. Cells are either rods or coccoid. It was initially isolated from an air sample in Taean County, South Korea. The species was first described in 2010, and its name is derived from Latin aer (air), and Greek philos (loving).

The optimum growth temperature for T. aeriphilus is 30 °C and can grow in the 5-35 °C range. The optimum pH is 6.0-7.0, and can grow in pH 4.0-9.0.
