= Terrabacter aerolatus =

Scientific classification
- Domain: Bacteria
- Kingdom: Bacillati
- Phylum: Actinomycetota
- Class: Actinomycetia
- Order: Micrococcales
- Family: Intrasporangiaceae
- Genus: Terrabacter
- Species: T. aerolatus

Binomial name
- Terrabacter aerolatus Weon et al. 2007

Species of bacteria

Terrabacter aerolatus is a species of gram-positive, nonmotile, non-endospore-forming bacteria.

The optimum growth temperature for T. aerolatus is 30 °C (86 °F) and can grow in the 5–35 °C (41–95 °F) range. The optimum pH is 7.0-8.0, and can grow in pH 4.0-9.0.
