= Terrabacter =

Scientific classification
- Domain: Bacteria
- Kingdom: Bacillati
- Phylum: Actinomycetota
- Class: Actinomycetia
- Order: Micrococcales
- Family: Intrasporangiaceae
- Genus: Terrabacter; Collins et al. 1989

Type species
- Terrabacter tumescens (Jensen 1934) Collins et al. 1989

Species
- T. aeriphilus Weon et al. 2010; T. aerolatus Weon et al. 2007; T. carboxydivorans Kim et al. 2011; T. ginsengisoli Jin et al. 2019; T. ginsenosidimutans An et al. 2011; "T. humi" Akter et al. 2020; T. koreensis Won et al. 2014; T. lapilli Lee et al. 2008; T. terrae Montero-Barrientos et al. 2005; T. terrigena Yoon et al. 2009; T. tumescens (Jensen 1934) Collins et al. 1989

Genus of bacteria

Terrabacter is a genus of Gram positive, strictly aerobic, non-sporeforming bacteria. The genus name is derived from Latin terra (earth), referring to the type species' original isolation from soil. The genus was first proposed in 1989; however, the type species Terrabacter tumescens was originally described in 1934, and had previously been classified in the genera Corynebacterium, Arthrobacter, and Pimelobacter. Terrabacter species have been isolated from soil, air and stone.
