= Hydrotalea =

Scientific classification
- Domain: Bacteria
- Kingdom: Pseudomonadati
- Phylum: Bacteroidota
- Class: Chitinophagia
- Order: Chitinophagales
- Family: Chitinophagaceae
- Genus: Hydrotalea; Kämpfer et al. 2011

Type species
- Hydrotalea flava

Species
- H. flava H. sandarakina

Genus of bacteria

Hydrotalea is a genus of gram-negative bacteria from the family of Chitinophagaceae.
