= Panacibacter =

Scientific classification
- Domain: Bacteria
- Kingdom: Pseudomonadati
- Phylum: Bacteroidota
- Class: Chitinophagia
- Order: Chitinophagales
- Family: Chitinophagaceae
- Genus: Panacibacter; Siddiqi et al. 2016

Type species
- Panacibacter ginsenosidivorans

Species
- P. ginsenosidivorans

Genus of bacteria

Panacibacter is a genus of gram-negative bacteria from the family of Chitinophagaceae with one known species (Panacibacter ginsenosidivorans). Panacibacter ginsenosidivorans has been isolated from soil from a ginseng field from Pocheon in Korea. P. ginsenosidivorans has an optimum growth temperature of 30 °C.
