= Flavipsychrobacter =

Scientific classification
- Domain: Bacteria
- Kingdom: Pseudomonadati
- Phylum: Bacteroidota
- Class: Chitinophagia
- Order: Chitinophagales
- Family: Chitinophagaceae
- Genus: Flavipsychrobacter; Liu et al. 2018

Type species
- Flavipsychrobacter stenotrophus

Species
- F. stenotrophus

Genus of bacteria

Flavipsychrobacter is a Gram-negative genus of bacteria from the family of Chitinophagaceae with one known species (Flavipsychrobacter stenotrophus). Flavipsychrobacter stenotrophus has been isolated from the Renlongba glacier in Tibet.
