= Sediminibacterium =

Scientific classification
- Domain: Bacteria
- Kingdom: Pseudomonadati
- Phylum: Bacteroidota
- Class: Chitinophagia
- Order: Chitinophagales
- Family: Chitinophagaceae
- Genus: Sediminibacterium; Qu and Yuan 2008

Type species
- Sediminibacterium salmoneum Qu and Yuan 2008

Species
- S. aquarii Kim et al. 2016; S. ginsengisoli Kim et al. 2013; S. goheungense Kang et al. 2014; S. lactis (Lee et al. 2013) García-López et al. 2020; S. magnilacihabitans (Albert et al. 2014) García-López et al. 2020; S. roseum Song et al. 2017; S. salmoneum Qu and Yuan 2008; "S. soli Wu et al. 2021

Synonyms
- Vibrionimonas Albert et al. 2014; Asinibacterium Lee et al. 2013

Genus of bacteria

Sediminibacterium is a genus of gram-negative bacteria from the family Chitinophagaceae.
