= Chitinophaga =

Scientific classification
- Domain: Bacteria
- Kingdom: Pseudomonadati
- Phylum: Bacteroidota
- Class: Chitinophagia
- Order: Chitinophagales
- Family: Chitinophagaceae
- Genus: Chitinophaga; Sangkhobol and Skerman 1981

Type species
- Chitinophaga pinensis

Species
- See text

Genus of bacteria

Chitinophaga is a genus of gram-negative bacteria from the family Chitinophagaceae.

== Species ==
The following species are validly published:

- Chitinophaga agri Lee et al. 2020
- Chitinophaga alhagiae Zou et al. 2019
- Chitinophaga arvensicola (Oyaizu et al. 1983) Kämpfer et al. 2006
- Chitinophaga aurantiaca Kim et al. 2019
- Chitinophaga barathri Zhang et al. 2015
- Chitinophaga caeni Jin et al. 2018
- Chitinophaga caseinilytica Dahal and Kim 2018
- Chitinophaga costaii Proença et al. 2014
- Chitinophaga cymbidii Li et al. 2013
- Chitinophaga deserti Kong et al. 2019
- Chitinophaga dinghuensis Lv et al. 2015
- Chitinophaga eiseniae Yasir et al. 2011
- Chitinophaga filiformis (Reichenbach 1989) Kämpfer et al. 2006
- Chitinophaga extrema Goh et al. 2020
- Chitinophaga flava Lv et al. 2019
- Chitinophaga ginsengihumi Lee and Whang 2014
- Chitinophaga ginsengisegetis Lee et al. 2007
- Chitinophaga ginsengisoli Lee et al. 2007
- Chitinophaga humicola Chaudhary and Kim 2018
- Chitinophaga japonensis (Fujita et al. 1997) Kämpfer et al. 2006
- Chitinophaga jiangningensis Wang et al. 2014
- Chitinophaga longshanensis Gao et al. 2015
- Chitinophaga lutea Zong et al. 2019
- Chitinophaga niabensis Weon et al. 2009
- Chitinophaga niastensis Weon et al. 2009
- Chitinophaga oryziterrae Chung et al. 2012
- Chitinophaga parva Ke et al. 2018
- Chitinophaga pinensis Sangkhobol and Skerman 1981
- Chitinophaga polysaccharea Han et al. 2014
- Chitinophaga qingshengii Cheng et al. 2015
- Chitinophaga rhizosphaerae Kim et al. 2017
- Chitinophaga rupis Lee et al. 2009
- Chitinophaga sancti (Lewin 1969) Kämpfer et al. 2006
- Chitinophaga sedimenti Li et al. 2017
- Chitinophaga silvisoli Wang et al. 2019
- Chitinophaga skermanii Kämpfer et al. 2006
- Chitinophaga solisilvae Ping et al. 2020
- Chitinophaga taiwanensis Lin et al. 2014
- Chitinophaga terrae Kim and Jung 2007
- Chitinophaga tropicalis Zhang et al. 2020
- Chitinophaga varians Lv et al. 2018
- Chitinophaga vietnamensis Tran et al. 2020
