= Terrabacter tumescens =

Scientific classification
- Domain: Bacteria
- Kingdom: Bacillati
- Phylum: Actinomycetota
- Class: Actinomycetes
- Order: Micrococcales
- Family: Intrasporangiaceae
- Genus: Terrabacter
- Species: T. tumescens

Binomial name
- Terrabacter tumescens (Jensen 1934) Collins et al. 1989

Synonyms
- Arthrobacter tumescens (Jensen 1934) Conn and Dimmick 1947 (Approved Lists 1980); "Corynebacterium tumescens" Jensen 1934; Pimelobacter tumescens (Jensen 1934) Suzuki and Komagata 1983

Species of bacteria

Terrabacter tumescens is a species of Gram-positive, mesophilic bacteria. Young cells are long rods, and older cultures are coccoid. It was first described in 1934, and its name is derived from Latin tume (from tumefacere, to make swollen), referencing how older cells swell and break off new cells. It was initially isolated from soil. The optimum growth temperature for T. tumescens is 25-30 °C and can grow in the 10-35 °C range.

The species was originally classified as Corynebacterium tumescens in 1934. In 1947, it was reclassified into the newly revived genus Arthrobacter as Arthrobacter tumescens. In 1982, the species was again reclassified into the novel genus Pimelobacter, and was named Pimelobacter tumescens. Finally, in 1989, the species was classified into the novel and current genus, Terrabacter.
