= Terrabacter carboxydivorans =

Scientific classification
- Domain: Bacteria
- Kingdom: Bacillati
- Phylum: Actinomycetota
- Class: Actinomycetes
- Order: Micrococcales
- Family: Intrasporangiaceae
- Genus: Terrabacter
- Species: T. carboxydivorans

Binomial name
- Terrabacter carboxydivorans Kim et al. 2011

Species of bacteria

Terrabacter carboxydivorans is a species of Gram-positive, nonmotile, non-endospore-forming bacteria. Cells are rod-shaped. It was initially isolated from roadside soil near Yonsei University, Seoul, South Korea during a survey for bacteria with the ability to digest carbon monoxide. The species was first described in 2011, and its name is derived from Latin carboxydum (air) and vorans (devouring, digesting).

The optimum growth temperature for T. carboxydivorans is 30 °C and can grow in the 15-40 °C range. It can grow in pH 4.0-12.0, and can also grow in the presence of 400 ppm carbon monoxide.
