= Terrabacter koreensis =

Scientific classification
- Domain: Bacteria
- Kingdom: Bacillati
- Phylum: Actinomycetota
- Class: Actinomycetes
- Order: Micrococcales
- Family: Intrasporangiaceae
- Genus: Terrabacter
- Species: T. koreensis

Binomial name
- Terrabacter koreensis Won et al. 2014

Species of bacteria

Terrabacter koreensis is a species of Gram-positive, nonmotile, non-endospore-forming bacteria. Cells are rod-shaped. It was initially isolated from soil from a flowerbed in Bucheon, South Korea. The species was first described in 2014, and its name refers to its South Korean isolation location.

The optimum growth temperature for T. koreensis is 28-30 °C and can grow in the 20-30 °C range. The optimum pH is 7.0-8.0 and can grow in pH 7.0-8.5.
