= Gypenoside =

Gypenosides are triterpenoid saponins and are the main active components of Gynostemma pentaphyllum, a climbing plant in the family Cucurbitaceae. They have been traditionally used in herbal medicine and have been shown to be effective in the treatment of cardiovascular diseases, although their mechanism of action is unknown.

Gypenosides can be divided into two main structural families, the dammarane-type and the cucurbitane-type. The dammarane-type saponins include compounds that are identical to those found in ginseng (ginsenosides Rb1, Rb3, F2, Rg3, Rc, Rd, malonyl-Rb1, and malonyl-Rd) as well as those that are chemically similar. As a result there is some interest in exploiting Gynostemma as a more scalable source of ginsenosides.

Some gypenosides are sweet-tasting, with one being 200 times as sweet as sucrose. Some other gypenosides are bitter-tasting. Both contribute to the taste of the plant.

Gypenoside A has the chemical formula C_{46}H_{74}O_{17}. It has a dammarane backbone attached to a chain of three sugars at the C-3 position.

Gypenoside XVII differs from ginsenoside Rb1 by the removal of an outer glucose group. Beta-glucosidase treatment converts the latter into the former.
