= Edaphobaculum =

Scientific classification
- Domain: Bacteria
- Kingdom: Pseudomonadati
- Phylum: Bacteroidota
- Class: Chitinophagia
- Order: Chitinophagales
- Family: Chitinophagaceae
- Genus: Edaphobaculum; Cao et al. 2017

Type species
- Edaphobaculum flavum

Species
- E. flavum

Genus of bacteria

Edaphobaculum is a Gram-negative, strictly aerobic, rod-shaped and non-motile genus of bacteria from the family of Chitinophagaceae with one known species (Edaphobaculum flavum). Edaphobaculum flavum has been isolated from grassland soil from Erdos in China.
