= Flavitalea =

Scientific classification
- Domain: Bacteria
- Kingdom: Pseudomonadati
- Phylum: Bacteroidota
- Class: Chitinophagia
- Order: Chitinophagales
- Family: Chitinophagaceae
- Genus: Flavitalea; Wang et al. 2011

Type species
- Flavitalea populi

Species
- F. antarctica F. gansuensis F. populi

Genus of bacteria

Flavitalea is a genus of gram-negative bacteria from the family of Chitinophagaceae.
