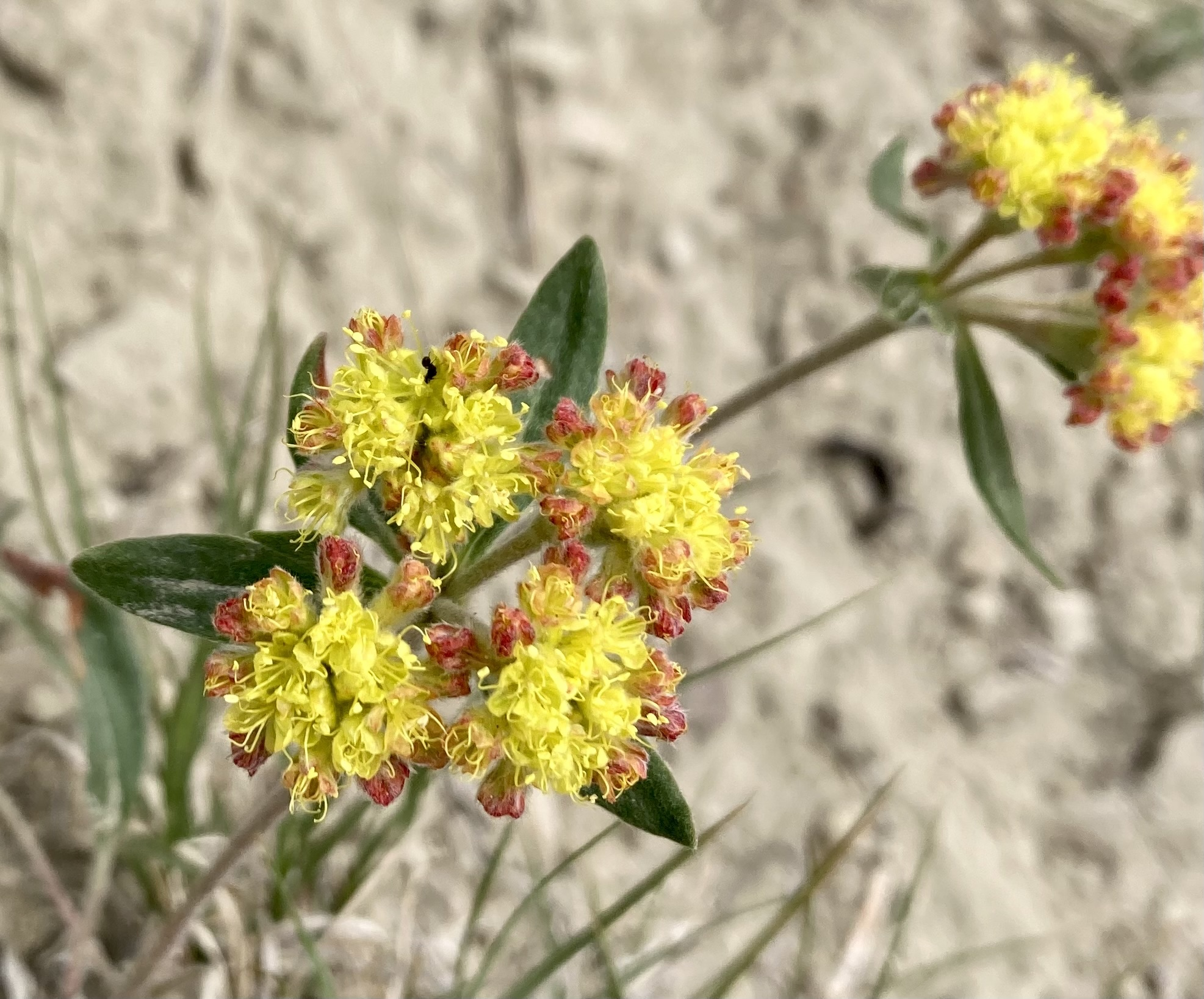

Conservation status
- Secure (NatureServe)

Scientific classification
- Kingdom: Plantae
- Clade: Embryophytes
- Clade: Tracheophytes
- Clade: Angiosperms
- Clade: Eudicots
- Order: Caryophyllales
- Family: Polygonaceae
- Genus: Eriogonum
- Species: E. flavum

Binomial name
- Eriogonum flavum Nutt. ex Benth.

Varieties
- E. f. var. aquilinum; E. f. var. flavum; E. f. var. piperi

Synonyms
- Eriogonum aureum; Eriogonum crassifolium; Eriogonum lateriflorum; Eriogonum piperi; Eriogonum polyphyllum; Eriogonum sericeum

= Eriogonum flavum =

Species of wild buckwheat

Eriogonum flavum is a species of wild buckwheat.

== Common names ==
This flower has several common names, including but not limited to: Pipers buckwheat, Pipers golden buckwheat, Yellow umbrella plant, and Pipers Wild Buckwheat.

The species epithet flavum is Latin for yellow and indicates its flower colour.

== Description ==
Eriogonum flavum is a perennial herb from taproot and woody caudex that forms dense mats in small areas, with leafless stems approximately 5–20 cm high. The dark green, 2.5–7 cm long leaves are spatulate-oblanceolate with long petioles. The plant is greenish above, while heavily whitish-tomentose below. This perennial herb re-emerges from taproot and woody caudex, and is likely long lived.

Flowers late May to mid July. The inflorescence is a dense umbel (umbrella shaped clusters,) with leaf like bracts at its base. There is one heavily villous involucre, roughly 5–6 mm high per ray of the umbel. The perianth is 4–6 mm long, very hairy, and typically pale yellow. it produces an aroma, that is unpleasant to humans but attracts pollinating bees. Roughly half of the viable population produce flowers in a given season, and seed are uncommon, further supporting longevity. Downhill transport of seeds is primary way of dispersal, but wind probably aids in dispersal uphill. However, downhill growth of caudex branches aids in vegetative dispersal. Fruit are 3–5 mm long three angled achenes that are sparsely pubescent at tip.

"Inflorescences subcapitate or umbellate, 0.5-3(-5) × 0.3-2.5(-3) dm; branches tomentose to floccose; bracts 4-6, leaflike to semileaflike at proximal node, 0.5-2 × 0.2-0.5 cm, sometimes absent immediately below involucre. Involucres 1 per node, turbinate to campanulate, 3-9 × 2-5 mm, tomentose to floccose; teeth 5-8, erect, 0.2-1 mm. Flowers 3-7 mm, including 0.2-1.5 mm stipelike base; perianth pale to bright yellow, densely pubescent abaxially; tepals monomorphic, oblong; stamens exserted, 3-6 mm; filaments pilose proximally. Achenes light brown to brown, 3-5 mm, glabrous except for sparsely pubescent beak."

== Human and wildlife uses ==
The plant has been observed as browse for many species of animal, including deer, elk, horses, bighorn sheep and mountain goats which browse the umbels. Blue grouse consume the leaves, as well as insects. Plains tribes of Native Americans used the mashed roots of this plant as ear plugs, and the flowers as an additive for the tanning of buffalo hides. The roots were eaten by children as a sweet snack

== Taxonomy ==
In 1836 George Bentham published the description of a new species in the Eriogonum genus, which he named Eriogonum flavum and attributed to Thomas Nuttall. Nuttall had published the name in 1813, but the accompanying description is too short to identify the species, making Bentham's later publication the correct description. Alongside the rest of its genus it is classified in the Polygonaceae.

=== Varieties ===
There are three accepted varieties of the species.

- Eriogonum flavum var. aquilinum – Native to Alaska and the Yukon
- Eriogonum flavum var. flavum – South central Canada and the central US
- Eriogonum flavum var. piperi – Western Canada and the northwestern US

Eriogonum flavum has 20 synonyms of the species or of two of its varieties.

Table of Synonyms
Name	Year	Rank	Synonym of:	Notes
Eriogonum androsaceum var. piperi (Greene) M.E.Jones	1908	variety	var. piperi	≡ hom.
Eriogonum aureum Nutt. ex Benth.	1856	species	var. flavum	= het.
Eriogonum crassifolium Benth.	1836	species	var. flavum	= het.
Eriogonum flavum Nutt.	1813	species	var. flavum	= het., diagnosis too brief.
Eriogonum flavum var. caudiciferum S.Stokes	1936	variety	var. flavum	= het.
Eriogonum flavum subsp. crassifolium (Benth.) S.Stokes	1936	subspecies	var. flavum	= het.
Eriogonum flavum var. crassifolium (Benth.) Benth.	1856	variety	var. flavum	= het.
Eriogonum flavum var. foliatum Gand.	1906	variety	var. flavum	= het.
Eriogonum flavum var. incisum S.Stokes	1936	variety	var. flavum	= het.
Eriogonum flavum var. linguifolium Gand.	1906	variety	var. flavum	= het.
Eriogonum flavum var. muticum S.Stokes	1936	variety	var. flavum	= het.
Eriogonum flavum subsp. piperi (Greene) S.Stokes	1936	subspecies	var. piperi	≡ hom.
Eriogonum flavum var. polyphyllum (Small) M.E.Jones	1903	variety	var. flavum	= het.
Eriogonum flavum subsp. typicum S.Stokes	1936	subspecies	E. flavum	≡ hom., not validly publ.
Eriogonum lateriflorum Raf.	1838	species	var. flavum	= het.
Eriogonum piperi Greene	1897	species	var. piperi	≡ hom.
Eriogonum piperi var. longiflorum Gand.	1906	variety	var. piperi	= het.
Eriogonum piperi var. ochrocephalum Gand.	1906	variety	var. piperi	= het.
Eriogonum polyphyllum Small	1900	species	var. flavum	= het.
Eriogonum sericeum Pursh	1813	species	var. flavum	= het.
Notes: ≡ homotypic synonym; = heterotypic synonym

== Habitat ==
This plant is generally found at moderate to high elevation, and grows on rocky open soils to ridges, or grasslands. Grows at 1,000 m in the Yukon, and as low as 170 m in Alaska, although the average throughout the southern portion of its range is around 2133.6 m. Associated with rock, scree, gravel, silt and loamy substrates. Usually associated with southern facing 20^{o} to 50^{o} slopes.

== Distribution ==
This species of plant has a very extensive range, including most of the Pacific Northwest. It is found north to British Columbia, south to the Blue Mountains of Oregon and California, east to south central Idaho, Colorado, and southwestern Alberta. Subspecies aquilinum is found north to the eastern portions of Alaska and throughout British Columbia and the Yukon.

== Cultivation ==
The noted wildflower author Claude A. Barr regarded yellow umbrella plant as an outstanding garden flower for its green velvety leaves and sulfur yellow flowers. Though it grows on stony soil in barren places in the wild it is successful in ordinary somewhat alkaline soils or even soils high in clay in garden settings. It increases by seed, but the crown and its thick taproot cannot be divided.
