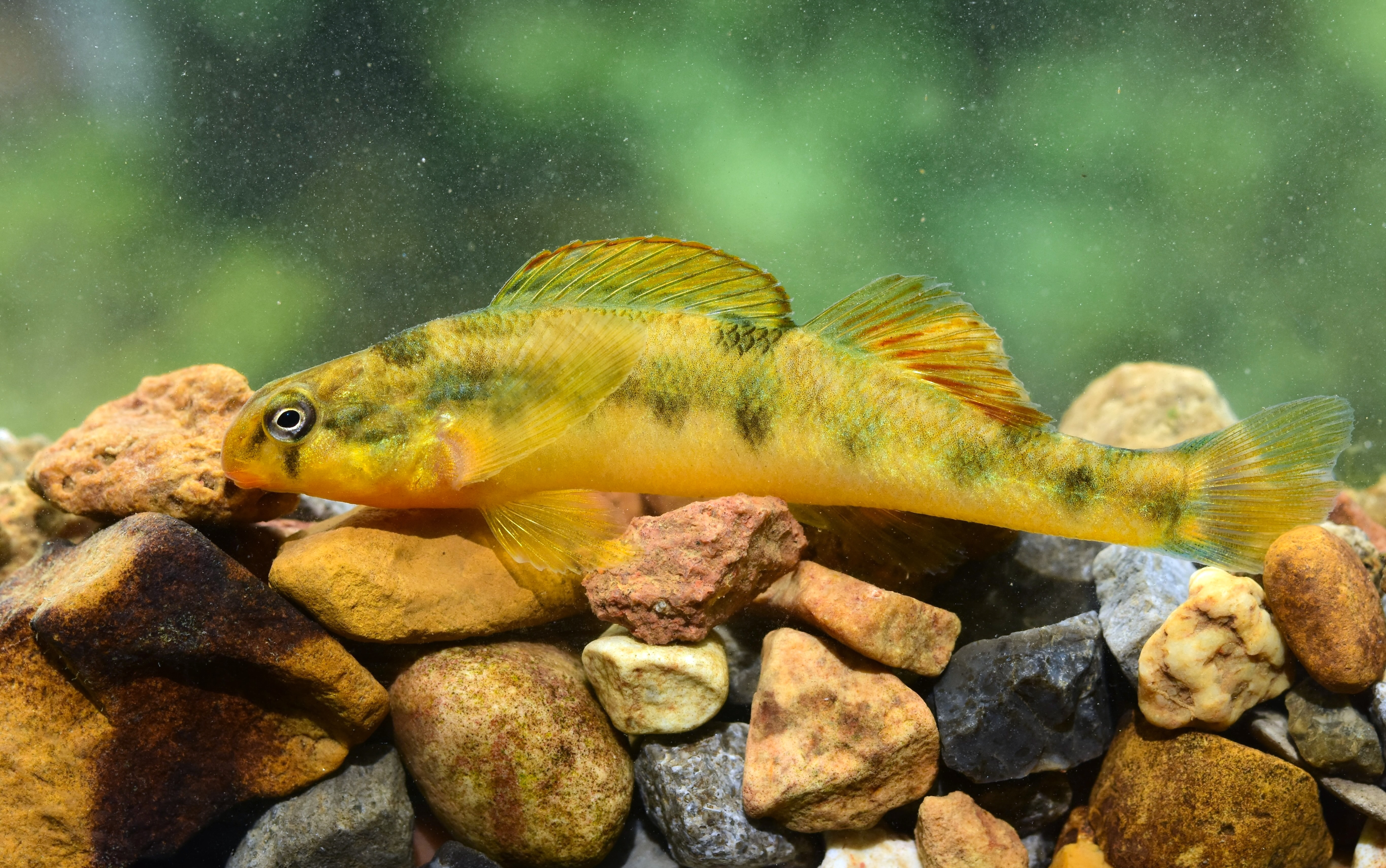

Conservation status
- Least Concern (IUCN 3.1)

Scientific classification
- Kingdom: Animalia
- Phylum: Chordata
- Class: Actinopterygii
- Order: Perciformes
- Family: Percidae
- Genus: Etheostoma
- Species: E. flavum

Binomial name
- Etheostoma flavum Etnier & R. M. Bailey, 1989

= Saffron darter =

Species of fish

The saffron darter (Etheostoma flavum) is a species of freshwater ray-finned fish, a darter from the subfamily Etheostomatinae, part of the family Percidae, which also contains the perches, ruffes and pikeperches. It is endemic to the eastern United States, where it is found in streams and creeks in Kentucky and Tennessee.

== Appearance and Anatomy ==
The saffron darter, like many snubnose darters, has a blunt snout. Typically, nuptial males have a uniformly yellow lower side and olive upper side as compared to the black darter (Etheostoma duryi), which has an orange to red lower and upper side. 'The adult males have yellow to orange lips while E. duryi has green or gray lips. Lastly, the mid-lateral stripe pigmentation in the saffron darter is nearly as dark as the 7–9 black lateral blotches. This species attains a maximum total length of 7 centimetres (2.8 in).

== Distribution ==
The saffron darter can be found in the lower Cumberland and Tennessee river drainages in Kentucky and Tennessee, upstream in Cumberland River drainages to Harpeth River, upstream in Tennessee River drainages (east side only), to upper Duck River, upper Buffalo River, and Indian River.

== Ecology ==
The saffron darter inhabits rocky pools and adjacent riffles of headwaters, creeks, and small rivers. Some biologists believe that the saffron darter is one of the most abundant darters in the second and fourth order streams.

== Taxonomy ==
The saffron darter was first formally described in 1989 by David A. Etnier and Reeve Maclaren Bailey (1911–2011) with the type locality given as Kentucky. It is a member of the subgenus Ulocentra and is closely related to the black darter and they have been known to both hybridize with each other and to competitively exclude each other, the saffron darter generally being found upstream of barriers and the black darter below them.
