= Parasediminibacterium =

Scientific classification
- Domain: Bacteria
- Kingdom: Pseudomonadati
- Phylum: Bacteroidota
- Class: Chitinophagia
- Order: Chitinophagales
- Family: Chitinophagaceae
- Genus: Parasediminibacterium; Kang et al. 2016

Type species
- Parasediminibacterium paludis

Species
- P. paludis

Genus of bacteria

Parasediminibacterium is a Gram-negative, strictly aerobic, rod-shaped and non-motile genus of bacteria from the family of Chitinophagaceae with one known species (Parasediminibacterium paludis). Parasediminibacterium paludis has been isolated from wetland from the Jeju Island in Korea.
