= Chitinophagaceae =

Scientific classification
- Domain: Bacteria
- Kingdom: Pseudomonadati
- Phylum: Bacteroidota
- Class: Chitinophagia; Munoz et al. 2017
- Order: Chitinophagales; Munoz et al. 2017
- Family: Chitinophagaceae; Kämpfer et al. 2011

Genera
- See text

Family of bacteria

Chitinophagaceae is an aerobic or facultatively anaerobic and rod-shaped family of bacteria in the phylum Bacteroidota.

== Genera ==
- Agriterribacter Lee and Whang 2020
- Arachidicoccus Madhaiyan et al. 2015
- Arvibacter Chaudhary and Kim 2016
- Aurantisolimonas Liu et al. 2018
- Chitinophaga Sangkhobol and Skerman 1981
- Cnuella Zhao et al. 2014
- Compostibacter Siddiqi et al. 2016
- Deminuibacter Wang et al. 2019
- Dinghuibacter Lv et al. 2016
- Edaphobaculum Cao et al. 2017
- "Edaphocola" Choi et al. 2019
- Ferruginibacter Lim et al. 2009
- Filimonas Shiratori et al. 2009
- Flaviaesturariibacter Kang et al. 2015
- Flavihumibacter Zhang et al. 2010
- Flavipsychrobacter Liu et al. 2018
- Flavisolibacter Yoon and Im 2007
- Flavitalea Wang et al. 2011
- "Foetidibacter" Pu et al. 2021
- "Ginsengibacter" Siddiqi et al. 2021
- Gynurincola Zhang et al. 2019
- Haoranjiania Zhang et al. 2016
- Heliimonas Leandro et al. 2013
- Hydrobacter Eder et al. 2015
- Hydrotalea Kämpfer et al. 2011
- "Ilyomonas" Chhetri et al. 2019
- Lacibacter Qu et al. 2009
- Mucibacter Kim et al. 2020
- Nemorincola Chaudhary et al. 2018
- Niabella Kim et al. 2007
- Niastella Weon et al. 2006
- Niveitalea Hyeon et al. 2017
- Panacibacter Siddiqi et al. 2016
- Paracnuella Wang et al. 2019
- Parafilimonas Kim et al. 2014
- Paraflavitalea Heo et al. 2020
- Parapseudoflavitalea Lawson et al. 2020
- Parasediminibacterium Kang et al. 2016
- Parasegetibacter Zhang et al. 2009
- Phnomibacter Siddiqi et al. 2021
- Pseudobacter Siddiqi and Im 2016
- "Pseudocnuella" Maeng et al. 2021
- Pseudoflavitalea Kim et al. 2016
- Puia Lv et al. 2017
- Rurimicrobium Dahal et al. 2017
- Sediminibacterium Qu and Yuan 2008
- Segetibacter An et al. 2007
- "Solibius" Kim et al. 2010
- Taibaiella Zhang et al. 2013
- Terrimonas Xie and Yokota 2006
- Thermoflavifilum Anders et al. 2014

== Phylogeny ==
The currently accepted taxonomy is based on the List of Prokaryotic names with Standing in Nomenclature and the phylogeny is based on whole-genome sequences. (Note: Agriterribacter, Arvibacter, Aurantisolimonas, Compostibacter, Deminuibacter, Dinghuibacter, Edaphobaculum, Ferruginibacter, Flaviaesturariibacter, Flavipsychrobacter, Flavitalea, Gynurincola, Haoranjiania, Heliimonas, Lacibacter, Mucibacter, Nemorincola, Niveitalea, Panacibacter, Paracnuella, Paraflavitalea, Parapseudoflavitalea, Parasediminibacterium, Parasegetibacter, Phnomibacter, Pseudobacter, Pseudoflavitalea, Puia, and Rurimicrobium are not included in this phylogenetic tree.)

- - Chitinophagia
    - - Thermoflavifilum
      - Chitinophaga
    - - Taibaiella
      - - Arachidicoccus
        - - - Segetibacter
            - - Parafilimonas
              - - Hydrotalea
                - - Filimonas
                  - - Sediminibacterium
                    - Hydrobacter
          - - - Flavihumibacter
              - Niastella
            - - - Cnuella
                - Flavisolibacter
              - - Terrimonas
                - Niabella
  - outgroup
    Sphingobacteriia
