= Sphingobacterium olei =

Scientific classification
- Domain: Bacteria
- Kingdom: Pseudomonadati
- Phylum: Bacteroidota
- Class: Sphingobacteriia
- Order: Sphingobacteriales
- Family: Sphingobacteriaceae
- Genus: Sphingobacterium
- Species: S. olei

Binomial name
- Sphingobacterium olei Liu et al. 2020

Species of bacterium

Sphingobacterium olei is a Gram-stain-negative, rod-shaped, and non-motile bacterium. It was first isolated from oil-contaminated soil in Daqing oil field, China. S. olei has been found to be able to degrade herbicides quizalofop-p-ethyl and diclofop-methyl. Before a name was given, S. olei was designated as strain HAL-9T. The species name olei means "of oil" in Latin.

== Morphology ==
Sphingobacterium olei is Gram-stain-negative, non-spore-forming, non-motile and rod-shaped. The cells are 0.5–0.6 μm in diameter and 1.1–1.3 μm in length. Colonies of S. olei are round, smooth, mucous and yellow. The yellow color is consistent with other Sphingobacterium species.

== Phylogeny ==
The genus Sphingobacterium is characterized by the high concentrations of sphingophospholipids as lipid components. The results of phylogenetic and genome-based analyses clearly suggest that S. olei belongs to the genus Sphingobacterium and represents a novel species. According to 16S rRNA analysis and multi-locus sequence analysis (MLST), S. olei shared the highest similarity to Sphingobacterium alkalisoli (98.3%), followed by Sphingobacterium mizutaii (95.1%) and Sphingobacterium lactis (95.1%). These values were below the 98.7% threshold suggested for proposing a novel species.

Some features distinguished S. olei from the most closely related S. alkalisoli. For example, unlike S. alkalisoli, S. olei are positive for oxidase, catalase, and glucose fermentation activities, while negative for nitrate reduction and indole production. S. alkalisoli could tolerate higher pH and salinity than S. olei, which might be due to the fact that S. alkalisoli was isolated from saline-alkaline soil.

== Genetics and genome ==
Sphingobacterium olei has a genome of 5.41million base pairs, which contains 4737 protein-coding genes and has a 40.6% GC content.

Sphingobacterium olei shared 98.3% genetic similarity to S. alkalisoli, another species under the genus Sphingobacterium, and less than 96% similarity to other reported members of the genus Sphingobacterium.

Although S. olei has similar genome size and features to other sphingobacteria, some differences could be observed. For example, S. olei has fewer genes that are putatively involved in cofactors, vitamins, prosthetic groups, pigments, cell wall and capsule, and phosphorus metabolism compared to S. alkalisoli. Meanwhile, more genes involved in nitrogen metabolism, sulfur metabolism, cell division and cell cycle have been putatively identified in S. olei compared to S. alkalisoli. These differences might be due to different habitats of the strains. S. alkalisoli is found in saline-alkaline soil of the same geographical region.

Sphingobacterium olei encodes for significantly more hydrolase enzymes than other sphingobacteria. Its genome contains 146 hydrolase genes, accounting for 3% of the total genes. Hydrolysis, a chemical reaction that hydrolases catalyze, has been shown to be a key step in herbicide degradation.

== Metabolism and biochemistry ==
Sphingobacterium olei is resistant to antibiotics including chloromycetin, kanamycin, polymyxin B, streptomycin, amikacin, gentamicin, lincomycin, novobiocin and neomycin.

Some key biochemical activities differ between S. olei and other strains of Sphingobacterium. S. olei assimilated capric acid and trisodium citrate, but not l-arabinose, d-mannose and d-mannitol. Oxidase activity was detected in S. olei but not in S. alkalisoli. The comparison of cellular fatty acid profiles revealed that the concentrations of iso-C_{15} : 0 and iso-C_{17} : 0 3-OH in S. olei were much lower than those in S. alkalisoli, while the concentration of summed feature 3 in S. olei was much higher than that in S. alkalisoli. In the polar lipid profiles, sphingophospholipid and two unknown phospholipids (PL1, PL2) were present in S. alkalisoli but not detected in S. olei; however, PGLs and Ls were present in S. olei but not detected in S. alkalisoli.

== Ecology ==
Sphingobacterium olei, initially designated as strain HAL-9T, was first isolated from an oil-contaminated soil sample collected from farmland near an oilfield in northern China. The soil sample was contaminated by crude oil spilled from an oil well. Before being contaminated by crude oil, the farmland was planted with soybean and corn, and herbicides such as quizalofop-p-ethyl, diclofop-methyl and atrazine were applied to the farmland for weeding every year.

While S. olei is incapable of degrading petroleum products associated with oilfield operations, it is found to efficiently degrade herbicides quizalofop-P-ethyl and diclofop-methyl. Approximately 95% of quizalofop-P-ethyl and diclofop-methyl was degraded after a five-day incubation. Previous studies revealed that the initial degradation step of these compounds was by hydrolysis, and S. olei has shown to possess a large number of hydrolase genes.

The inability of S. olei to utilize petroleum hydrocarbons in farmland soil can be explained by its lack of alkane monooxygenase and aromatic ring-cleavage dioxygenase genes. On the other hand, the diversity of hydrolase genes in the genome of S. olei enabled the degradation of herbicides as its energy and carbon sources and thus survive in the farmland environment.
