= Mucilaginibacter yixingensis =

Scientific classification
- Domain: Bacteria
- Kingdom: Pseudomonadati
- Phylum: Bacteroidota
- Class: Sphingobacteriia
- Order: Sphingobacteriales
- Family: Sphingobacteriaceae
- Genus: Mucilaginibacter
- Species: M. yixingensis

Binomial name
- Mucilaginibacter yixingensis Jing et al. 2016

Type strain
- CCTCC AB 2012880, DSM 26809, YX-36

Species of bacterium

Mucilaginibacter yixingensis is a Gram-negative, non-spore-forming, aerobic, rod-shaped and non-motile bacterium from the genus of Mucilaginibacter which has been isolated from vegetable soil in Yixing in China.
