= Sphingobacterium jejuense =

Scientific classification
- Domain: Bacteria
- Kingdom: Pseudomonadati
- Phylum: Bacteroidota
- Class: Sphingobacteriia
- Order: Sphingobacteriales
- Family: Sphingobacteriaceae
- Genus: Sphingobacterium
- Species: S. jejuense

Binomial name
- Sphingobacterium jejuense Siddiqi et al. 2016

Type strain
- JCM 30948, KACC 18625, GJ30-7

Species of bacterium

Sphingobacterium jejuense is a Gram-negative, strictly aerobic and non-motile bacterium from the genus Sphingobacterium which has been isolated from isolated from compost.
