= Mucilaginibacter gracilis =

Scientific classification
- Domain: Bacteria
- Kingdom: Pseudomonadati
- Phylum: Bacteroidota
- Class: Sphingobacteriia
- Order: Sphingobacteriales
- Family: Sphingobacteriaceae
- Genus: Mucilaginibacter
- Species: M. gracilis

Binomial name
- Mucilaginibacter gracilis Pankratov et al. 2007

Type strain
- ATCC BAA-1391, DSM 18602, TPT18, VKM B-2447

Species of bacterium

Mucilaginibacter gracilis is a Gram-negative, facultatively aerobic, heterotrophic and non-motile bacterium from the genus of Mucilaginibacter which has been isolated from Sphagnum peat bog in the Tomsk Region in Russia.
