= Mucilaginibacter ginsenosidivorax =

Scientific classification
- Domain: Bacteria
- Kingdom: Pseudomonadati
- Phylum: Bacteroidota
- Class: Sphingobacteriia
- Order: Sphingobacteriales
- Family: Sphingobacteriaceae
- Genus: Mucilaginibacter
- Species: M. ginsenosidivorax

Binomial name
- Mucilaginibacter ginsenosidivorax Kim et al. 2013

Type strain
- KACC 14955, LMG 25804, KH I28, KHI28

Species of bacterium

Mucilaginibacter ginsenosidivorax is a bacterium from the genus of Mucilaginibacter which has been isolated from sediments from the river Gapcheon in Korea. Mucilaginibacter ginsenosidivorax has the ability to convert ginsenoside.
