= Pseudopedobacter saltans =

Scientific classification
- Domain: Bacteria
- Kingdom: Pseudomonadati
- Phylum: Bacteroidota
- Class: Sphingobacteriia
- Order: Sphingobacteriales
- Family: Sphingobacteriaceae
- Genus: Pseudopedobacter
- Species: P. saltans

Binomial name
- Pseudopedobacter saltans (Steyn et al. 1998), Cao et al. 2014

Synonyms
- Pedobacter saltans

Species of bacterium

Pseudopedobacter saltans is a species of heparinase-producing bacteria. Pedobacter saltans was reclassified to Pseudopedobacter saltans.
