= Arcticibacter svalbardensis =

Scientific classification
- Domain: Bacteria
- Kingdom: Pseudomonadati
- Phylum: Bacteroidota
- Class: Sphingobacteriia
- Order: Sphingobacteriales
- Family: Sphingobacteriaceae
- Genus: Arcticibacter
- Species: A. svalbardensis

Binomial name
- Arcticibacter svalbardensis Prasad et al. 2013

Type strain
- CIP110422, KCTC 32015, MN12-7

Species of bacterium

Arcticibacter svalbardensis is a Gram-negative, rod-shaped and non-motile bacterium from the genus Arcticibacter which has been isolated from surface soil from Ny-Ålesund on Svalbard.
