= Pedobacter borealis =

Scientific classification
- Domain: Bacteria
- Kingdom: Pseudomonadati
- Phylum: Bacteroidota
- Class: Sphingobacteriia
- Order: Sphingobacteriales
- Family: Sphingobacteriaceae
- Genus: Pedobacter
- Species: P. borealis

Binomial name
- Pedobacter borealis Gordon et al. 2009

Species of bacterium

Pedobacter borealis is a Gram-negative, rod-shaped, non-spore-forming eubacterial species. Its type strain is G-1^{T} (=DSM 19626^{T} =LMG 24259^{T}).
