= Mucilaginibacter jinjuensis =

Scientific classification
- Domain: Bacteria
- Kingdom: Pseudomonadati
- Phylum: Bacteroidota
- Class: Sphingobacteriia
- Order: Sphingobacteriales
- Family: Sphingobacteriaceae
- Genus: Mucilaginibacter
- Species: M. jinjuensis

Binomial name
- Mucilaginibacter jinjuensis Khan et al. 2013

Type strain
- KACC 16571, NBRC 108856, YC7004

Species of bacterium

Mucilaginibacter jinjuensis is a Gram-negative and rod-shaped bacterium from the genus of Mucilaginibacter which has been isolated from rotten wood in Jinju in Korea. Mucilaginibacter jinjuensis has the ability to degrade xylan.
