= Mucilaginibacter gotjawali =

Scientific classification
- Domain: Bacteria
- Kingdom: Pseudomonadati
- Phylum: Bacteroidota
- Class: Sphingobacteriia
- Order: Sphingobacteriales
- Family: Sphingobacteriaceae
- Genus: Mucilaginibacter
- Species: M. gotjawali

Binomial name
- Mucilaginibacter gotjawali Lee et al. 2015

Type strain
- CECT 8628, DSM 29289, KCTC 32515, SA3-7

Species of bacterium

Mucilaginibacter gotjawali is a Gram-negative and non-motile bacterium from the genus of Mucilaginibacter which has been isolated from soil from the Gotjawal forest on Jejudo on Korea.
