= Mucilaginibacter lutimaris =

Scientific classification
- Domain: Bacteria
- Kingdom: Pseudomonadati
- Phylum: Bacteroidota
- Class: Sphingobacteriia
- Order: Sphingobacteriales
- Family: Sphingobacteriaceae
- Genus: Mucilaginibacter
- Species: M. lutimaris

Binomial name
- Mucilaginibacter lutimaris Kim et al. 2012

Type strain
- CCUG 60742, KCTC 23461, BR-3

Species of bacterium

Mucilaginibacter lutimaris is a Gram-negative, facultatively aerobic, non-spore-forming, rod-shaped and non-motile bacterium from the genus of Mucilaginibacter which has been isolated from tidal flat sediments from the western coast of Korea.
