= Pedobacter alluvionis =

Scientific classification
- Domain: Bacteria
- Kingdom: Pseudomonadati
- Phylum: Bacteroidota
- Class: Sphingobacteriia
- Order: Sphingobacteriales
- Family: Sphingobacteriaceae
- Genus: Pedobacter
- Species: P. alluvionis

Binomial name
- Pedobacter alluvionis Gordon et al. 2009

Species of bacterium

Pedobacter alluvionis is a Gram-negative, rod-shaped, non-spore-forming eubacterial species. Its type strain is NWER-II11^{T} (=DSM 19624^{T} =LMG 24258^{T}).
