= Sphingobacterium faecium =

Scientific classification
- Domain: Bacteria
- Kingdom: Pseudomonadati
- Phylum: Bacteroidota
- Class: Sphingobacteriia
- Order: Sphingobacteriales
- Family: Sphingobacteriaceae
- Genus: Sphingobacterium
- Species: S. faecium

Binomial name
- Sphingobacterium faecium Takeuchi and Yokota 1993

Type strain
- CIP 104193, DSM 11690, IAM 15376, IFO 15299, JCM 21820, KS 0470, LMG 14022, NBRC 15299, NCIMB 13408

Species of bacterium

Sphingobacterium faecium is a bacterium from the genus Sphingobacterium which has been isolated from the feces of the cattle Bos sprunigenius taurus.
