= Mucilaginibacter lappiensis =

Scientific classification
- Domain: Bacteria
- Kingdom: Pseudomonadati
- Phylum: Bacteroidota
- Class: Sphingobacteriia
- Order: Sphingobacteriales
- Family: Sphingobacteriaceae
- Genus: Mucilaginibacter
- Species: M. lappiensis

Binomial name
- Mucilaginibacter lappiensis Männistö et al. 2010

Type strain
- ANJLI2, ATCC BAA-1855, LMG 25358

Species of bacterium

Mucilaginibacter lappiensis is an aerobic, chemoorganotrophic and non-motile bacterium from the genus of Mucilaginibacter which has been isolated from the Finnish Lapland.
