= Mucilaginibacter mallensis =

Scientific classification
- Domain: Bacteria
- Kingdom: Pseudomonadati
- Phylum: Bacteroidota
- Class: Sphingobacteriia
- Order: Sphingobacteriales
- Family: Sphingobacteriaceae
- Genus: Mucilaginibacter
- Species: M. mallensis

Binomial name
- Mucilaginibacter mallensis Männistö et al. 2010

Type strain
- ATCC BAA-1856, LMG 25360, MP1X4

Species of bacterium

Mucilaginibacter mallensis is a chemoorganotrophic, aerobic and non-motile bacterium from the genus of Mucilaginibacter which has been isolated from the Finnish Lapland.
