= Pedobacter soli =

Scientific classification
- Domain: Bacteria
- Kingdom: Pseudomonadati
- Phylum: Bacteroidota
- Class: Sphingobacteriia
- Order: Sphingobacteriales
- Family: Sphingobacteriaceae
- Genus: Pedobacter
- Species: P. soli

Binomial name
- Pedobacter soli Kwon et al. 2011

Species of bacterium

Pedobacter soli is a species of Gram-negative bacteria, first isolated from rhizosphere soil of Brassica campestris, hence its name. Its type strain is 15-51(T) (=KACC 14939(T) =NBRC 107691(T)).
