= Sphingobacterium gobiense =

Scientific classification
- Domain: Bacteria
- Kingdom: Pseudomonadati
- Phylum: Bacteroidota
- Class: Sphingobacteriia
- Order: Sphingobacteriales
- Family: Sphingobacteriaceae
- Genus: Sphingobacterium
- Species: S. gobiense

Binomial name
- Sphingobacterium gobiense Zhao et al. 2014

Type strain
- ACCC 05757, KCTC 32293, H7

Synonyms
- Sphingobacterium gobideserti

Species of bacterium

Sphingobacterium gobiense is a Gram-negative, short rod-shaped, non-spore-formin and non-motile bacterium from the genus Sphingobacterium which has been isolated from soil from the Gobi Desert in the Xinjiang Province in China.
