= Sphingobacterium kitahiroshimense =

Scientific classification
- Domain: Bacteria
- Kingdom: Pseudomonadati
- Phylum: Bacteroidota
- Class: Sphingobacteriia
- Order: Sphingobacteriales
- Family: Sphingobacteriaceae
- Genus: Sphingobacterium
- Species: S. kitahiroshimense

Binomial name
- Sphingobacterium kitahiroshimense Matsuyama et al. 2008

Type strain
- 10C, JCM 14970, NCIMB 14398

Synonyms
- Sphingobacterium kitahiroense

Species of bacterium

Sphingobacterium kitahiroshimense is a Gram-negative, exopolysaccharide-degrading, strictly aerobic and chemoheterotrophic bacterium from the genus Sphingobacterium which has been isolated from soil from the city Kitahiroshima on Japan.
