= Mucilaginibacter soli =

Scientific classification
- Domain: Bacteria
- Kingdom: Pseudomonadati
- Phylum: Bacteroidota
- Class: Sphingobacteriia
- Order: Sphingobacteriales
- Family: Sphingobacteriaceae
- Genus: Mucilaginibacter
- Species: M. soli

Binomial name
- Mucilaginibacter soli Jiang et al. 2012

Type strain
- CCTCC AB 2010331, R9-65, NRRL B-59458

Species of bacterium

Mucilaginibacter soli is a Gram-negative, facultatively anaerobic, rod-shaped and non-motile bacterium from the genus of Mucilaginibacter which has been isolated from soil from the Arctic tundra near Ny-Ålesund in Norway.
