= Sphingobacterium caeni =

Scientific classification
- Domain: Bacteria
- Kingdom: Pseudomonadati
- Phylum: Bacteroidota
- Class: Sphingobacteriia
- Order: Sphingobacteriales
- Family: Sphingobacteriaceae
- Genus: Sphingobacterium
- Species: S. caeni

Binomial name
- Sphingobacterium caeni Sun et al. 2013

Type strain
- CCTCC AB 2012020, DC-8, KACC 16850

Species of bacterium

Sphingobacterium caeni is a gram-negative, non-spore-forming, rod-shaped and non-motile bacterium from the genus Sphingobacterium which has been isolated from activated sludge.
