= Pedobacter heparinus =

Scientific classification
- Domain: Bacteria
- Kingdom: Pseudomonadati
- Phylum: Bacteroidota
- Class: Sphingobacteriia
- Order: Sphingobacteriales
- Family: Sphingobacteriaceae
- Genus: Pedobacter
- Species: P. heparinus

Binomial name
- Pedobacter heparinus Steyn et al. 1998

Species of bacterium

Pedobacter heparinus is non-spore-forming, Gram-negative bacterium that can use carbohydrates as its sole nutrient source.
