= Parapedobacter luteus =

Scientific classification
- Domain: Bacteria
- Kingdom: Pseudomonadati
- Phylum: Bacteroidota
- Class: Sphingobacteriia
- Order: Sphingobacteriales
- Family: Sphingobacteriaceae
- Genus: Parapedobacter
- Species: P. luteus

Binomial name
- Parapedobacter luteus Kim et al. 2010

Type strain
- 4M29, DSM 22899, JCM 15977, KACC 10955

Species of bacterium

Parapedobacter luteus is a Gram-negative, non-spore-forming and aerobic bacterium from the genus of Parapedobacter which has been isolated from cotton waste compost in Suwon in Korea.
