= Olivibacter ginsengisoli =

Scientific classification
- Domain: Bacteria
- Kingdom: Pseudomonadati
- Phylum: Bacteroidota
- Class: Sphingobacteriia
- Order: Sphingobacteriales
- Family: Sphingobacteriaceae
- Genus: Olivibacter
- Species: O. ginsengisoli

Binomial name
- Olivibacter ginsengisoli Wang et al. 2008

Type strain
- Gsoil 060, KCTC 12646, LMG 23491

Species of bacterium

Olivibacter ginsengisoli is a Gram-negative, aerobic, heterotrophic, rod-shaped, non-spore-forming and non-motile bacterium from the genus of Olivibacter which has been isolated from Korea.
