= Mucilaginibacter gossypii =

Scientific classification
- Domain: Bacteria
- Kingdom: Pseudomonadati
- Phylum: Bacteroidota
- Class: Sphingobacteriia
- Order: Sphingobacteriales
- Family: Sphingobacteriaceae
- Genus: Mucilaginibacter
- Species: M. gossypii

Binomial name
- Mucilaginibacter gossypii Madhaiyan et al. 2010

Type strain
- KCTC 22380, NCIMB 14470, Gh-67

Species of bacterium

Mucilaginibacter gossypii is a Gram-negative, non-motile and plant-growth-promoting bacterium from the genus of Mucilaginibacter which has been isolated from rhizosphere soil from cotton plants.
