= Mucilaginibacter craterilacus =

Scientific classification
- Domain: Bacteria
- Kingdom: Pseudomonadati
- Phylum: Bacteroidota
- Class: Sphingobacteriia
- Order: Sphingobacteriales
- Family: Sphingobacteriaceae
- Genus: Mucilaginibacter
- Species: M. craterilacus

Binomial name
- Mucilaginibacter craterilacus Lee et al. 2017

Type strain
- KCTC 52404, KCTC 52404, strain N60A

Genus of bacteria

Mucilaginibacter craterilacus is a Gram-negative and non-motile bacterium from the genus of Mucilaginibacter which has been isolated from the soil of a crater lake from Baekrokdam on the Jeju Island.
