= Olivibacter soli =

Scientific classification
- Domain: Bacteria
- Kingdom: Pseudomonadati
- Phylum: Bacteroidota
- Class: Sphingobacteriia
- Order: Sphingobacteriales
- Family: Sphingobacteriaceae
- Genus: Olivibacter
- Species: O. soli

Binomial name
- Olivibacter soli Wang et al. 2008

Type strain
- Gsoil 034, KCTC 12645, LMG 23492

Species of bacterium

Olivibacter soli is a Gram-negative, aerobic, non-spore-forming, rod-shaped, heterotrophic and non-motile bacterium from the genus of Olivibacter which has been isolated from Korea.
