= Pedobacter ginsengisoli =

Scientific classification
- Domain: Bacteria
- Kingdom: Pseudomonadati
- Phylum: Bacteroidota
- Class: Sphingobacteriia
- Order: Sphingobacteriales
- Family: Sphingobacteriaceae
- Genus: Pedobacter
- Species: P. ginsengisoli

Binomial name
- Pedobacter ginsengisoli Ten et al. 2006

Species of bacterium

Pedobacter ginsengisoli is a species of bacteria first isolated from a ginseng field, hence its name. It is a Gram-negative, strictly aerobic, rod-shaped, non-motile and non-spore-forming bacterial strain with type strain Gsoil 104T (=KCTC 12576T =LMG 23399T).
