= Olivibacter sitiensis =

Scientific classification
- Domain: Bacteria
- Kingdom: Pseudomonadati
- Phylum: Bacteroidota
- Class: Sphingobacteriia
- Order: Sphingobacteriales
- Family: Sphingobacteriaceae
- Genus: Olivibacter
- Species: O. sitiensis

Binomial name
- Olivibacter sitiensis Ntougias et al. 2007

Type strain
- AW-6, CECT 7133, CIP 109529, DSM 17696

Species of bacterium

Olivibacter sitiensis is a gram-negative, aerobic, non-spore-forming, rod-shaped and non-motile bacterium from the genus of Olivibacter that has been isolated from alkaline olive-oil mill wastes on Sitia on Crete. Olivibacter sitiensis has the ability to degrade diphenol.
