= Mucilaginibacter ximonensis =

Scientific classification
- Domain: Bacteria
- Kingdom: Pseudomonadati
- Phylum: Bacteroidota
- Class: Sphingobacteriia
- Order: Sphingobacteriales
- Family: Sphingobacteriaceae
- Genus: Mucilaginibacter
- Species: M. ximonensis

Binomial name
- Mucilaginibacter ximonensis Luo et al. 2009

Type strain
- CCTCC AB 207094, KCTC 22437, XM-003

Species of bacterium

Mucilaginibacter ximonensis is a Gram-negative and non-motile bacterium from the genus of Mucilaginibacter which has been isolated from soil from the Ximo region in Tibet in China.
