= Pedobacter terricola =

Scientific classification
- Domain: Bacteria
- Kingdom: Pseudomonadati
- Phylum: Bacteroidota
- Class: Sphingobacteriia
- Order: Sphingobacteriales
- Family: Sphingobacteriaceae
- Genus: Pedobacter
- Species: P. terricola

Binomial name
- Pedobacter terricola Yoon et al. 2007

Species of bacterium

Pedobacter terricola is a species of Gram-negative, non-motile, pleomorphic bacteria. Its type strain is DS-45(T) (=KCTC 12876(T) =JCM 14594(T)).
