= Pedobacter rhizosphaerae =

Scientific classification
- Domain: Bacteria
- Kingdom: Pseudomonadati
- Phylum: Bacteroidota
- Class: Sphingobacteriia
- Order: Sphingobacteriales
- Family: Sphingobacteriaceae
- Genus: Pedobacter
- Species: P. rhizosphaerae

Binomial name
- Pedobacter rhizosphaerae Kwon et al. 2011

Species of bacterium

Pedobacter rhizosphaerae is a species of Gram-negative bacteria, first isolated from rhizosphere soil of Brassica campestris, hence its name. Its type strain is 01-96(T) (=KACC 14938(T) =NBRC 107690(T)).
