= Nubsella zeaxanthinifaciens =

Scientific classification
- Domain: Bacteria
- Kingdom: Pseudomonadati
- Phylum: Bacteroidota
- Class: Sphingobacteriia
- Order: Sphingobacteriales
- Family: Sphingobacteriaceae
- Genus: Nubsella
- Species: N. zeaxanthinifaciens

Binomial name
- Nubsella zeaxanthinifaciens Asker et al. 2008

Type strain
- CCUG 54348, NBRC 102579, TDMA-5

Synonyms
- Pedobacter zeaxanthinifaciens

Species of bacterium

Nubsella zeaxanthinifaciens is a Gram-negative, strictly aerobic and rod-shaped bacterium from the genus of Nubsella which has been isolated from freshwater in Misasa in Japan. Nubsella zeaxanthinifaciens produces zeaxanthin.
