= Sphingobacterium arenae =

Scientific classification
- Domain: Bacteria
- Kingdom: Pseudomonadati
- Phylum: Bacteroidota
- Class: Sphingobacteriia
- Order: Sphingobacteriales
- Family: Sphingobacteriaceae
- Genus: Sphingobacterium
- Species: S. arenae

Binomial name
- Sphingobacterium arenae Jiang et al. 2014

Species of bacterium

Sphingobacterium arenae is a Gram-negative, non-spore-forming, short rod-shaped and non-motile bacterium from the genus Sphingobacterium which has been isolated from sandy soil in Xinjiang in China.
