= Mucilaginibacter panaciglaebae =

Scientific classification
- Domain: Bacteria
- Kingdom: Pseudomonadati
- Phylum: Bacteroidota
- Class: Sphingobacteriia
- Order: Sphingobacteriales
- Family: Sphingobacteriaceae
- Genus: Mucilaginibacter
- Species: M. panaciglaebae

Binomial name
- Mucilaginibacter panaciglaebae Lee et al. 2018

Type strain
- JCM 17085, KACC 14957, BXN5-31

Genus of bacteria

Mucilaginibacter panaciglaebae is a Gram-negative, strictly aerobic, rod-shaped and non-motile bacterium from the genus of Mucilaginibacter which has been isolated from soil from a ginseng field.
