= Mucilaginibacter defluvii =

Scientific classification
- Domain: Bacteria
- Kingdom: Pseudomonadati
- Phylum: Bacteroidota
- Class: Sphingobacteriia
- Order: Sphingobacteriales
- Family: Sphingobacteriaceae
- Genus: Mucilaginibacter
- Species: M. defluvii

Binomial name
- Mucilaginibacter defluvii Hwang et al. 2014

Type strain
- A5, JCM 18283, KCTC 23922

Species of bacterium

Mucilaginibacter defluvii is a Gram-negative, rod-shaped, aerobic and non-motile bacterium from the genus of Mucilaginibacter which has been isolated from a dye wastewater treatment facility in Korea.
