= Solitalea koreensis =

Scientific classification
- Domain: Bacteria
- Kingdom: Pseudomonadati
- Phylum: Bacteroidota
- Class: Sphingobacteriia
- Order: Sphingobacteriales
- Family: Sphingobacteriaceae
- Genus: Solitalea
- Species: S. koreensis

Binomial name
- Solitalea koreensis Weon et al. 2009

Type strain
- DSM 21342, KACC 12953, R-2 A36-4

Species of bacterium

Solitalea koreensis is a Gram-negative, rod-shaped and non-spore-forming bacterium from the genus of Solitalea which has been isolated from greenhouse soil in Yongin in Korea.
