= Pedobacter arcticus =

Scientific classification
- Domain: Bacteria
- Kingdom: Pseudomonadati
- Phylum: Bacteroidota
- Class: Sphingobacteriia
- Order: Sphingobacteriales
- Family: Sphingobacteriaceae
- Genus: Pedobacter
- Species: P. arcticus

Binomial name
- Pedobacter arcticus Zhou et al. 2011

Species of bacterium

Pedobacter arcticus is a species of facultative psychrophile bacteria isolated from Arctic soil. It is gram-negative, short rod-shaped and motile (by gliding), with type strain A12(T) ( = CCTCC AB 2010223(T) = NRRL B-59457(T)). Its genome has been sequenced.
