= Olivibacter jilunii =

Scientific classification
- Domain: Bacteria
- Kingdom: Pseudomonadati
- Phylum: Bacteroidota
- Class: Sphingobacteriia
- Order: Sphingobacteriales
- Family: Sphingobacteriaceae
- Genus: Olivibacter
- Species: O. jilunii

Binomial name
- Olivibacter jilunii Chen et al. 2013

Type strain
- CCTCC AB 2010105, KCTC 23098, 14-2A

Species of bacterium

Olivibacter jilunii is a Gram-negative, aerobic, non-spore-forming and non-motile bacterium from the genus of Olivibacter which has been isolated from DDT-contaminated soil in China.
