= Sphingobacterium spiritivorum =

Scientific classification
- Domain: Bacteria
- Kingdom: Pseudomonadati
- Phylum: Bacteroidota
- Class: Sphingobacteriia
- Order: Sphingobacteriales
- Family: Sphingobacteriaceae
- Genus: Sphingobacterium
- Species: S. spiritivorum

Binomial name
- Sphingobacterium spiritivorum (Holmes et al. 1982) Yabuuchi et al. 1983

Species of bacterium

Spingobacterium spiritivorum is a gram-negative, rod-shaped bacterium, and is a member of the phylum Bacteroidota. It is aerobic, non-motile, and non-spore-producing. It is positive for catalase, oxidase, and urease, and produces yellow colonies on blood agar plates. S. spiritivorum is commonly isolated from soil and water. S. spiritivorum was initially identified as a Flavobacterium, but the genus name Sphingobacterium was later proposed due to its high numbers of sphingophospholipids in the cell wall, differentiating it from Flavobacterium.

== Associations with infection ==
S. spiritivorum associated infections are rare, there are only a limited number of cases of Sphingobacterium spiritivorum bacteremia and S. spiritivorum associated infections. S. spiritivorum and S. multivorum are the only Sphingobacterium which have been isolated from human clinical specimens. S. spiritivorum is commonly identified through blood and urine.

Sphingobacterium spiritivorum infections, while rare, are most commonly associated with cellulitis and septicemia. Though it has also been associated with scrub typhus, post-keratoplasty keratitis, and extrinsic allergic alveolitis among other complications, procedures, and infections.

== Bioremediation ==
Sphingobacterium spiritivorum has also been used in the bioremediation of benzo(a)pyrene and phenanthrene contaminated soils though there is limited research surrounding the biodegradation of soil contaminants.
