= Sphingobacterium populi =

Scientific classification
- Domain: Bacteria
- Kingdom: Pseudomonadati
- Phylum: Bacteroidota
- Class: Sphingobacteriia
- Order: Sphingobacteriales
- Family: Sphingobacteriaceae
- Genus: Sphingobacterium
- Species: S. populi

Binomial name
- Sphingobacterium populi Li et al. 2016

Type strain
- CFCC 11742, KCTC 42247, 7Y-4

Species of bacterium

Sphingobacterium populi is a Gram-negative, aerobic and non-motile bacterium from the genus Sphingobacterium which has been isolated from the bark of the tree Populus × euramericana.
