= Arcticibacter pallidicorallinus =

Scientific classification
- Domain: Bacteria
- Kingdom: Pseudomonadati
- Phylum: Bacteroidota
- Class: Sphingobacteriia
- Order: Sphingobacteriales
- Family: Sphingobacteriaceae
- Genus: Arcticibacter
- Species: A. pallidicorallinus

Binomial name
- Arcticibacter pallidicorallinus Liu et al. 2014

Type strain
- CGMCC 1.9313, KCTC 32542, Hh36

Species of bacterium

Arcticibacter pallidicorallinus is a Gram-negative and rod-shaped bacterium from the genus Arcticibacter which has been isolated from glacier ice from a glacier in Xinjiang in China.
