= Sphingobacterium bambusae =

Scientific classification
- Domain: Bacteria
- Kingdom: Pseudomonadati
- Phylum: Bacteroidota
- Class: Sphingobacteriia
- Order: Sphingobacteriales
- Family: Sphingobacteriaceae
- Genus: Sphingobacterium
- Species: S. bambusae

Binomial name
- Sphingobacterium bambusae Duan et al. 2010

Species of bacterium

Sphingobacterium bambusae is a Gram-negative, non-spore-forming and non-motile bacterium from the genus Sphingobacterium which has been isolated from soil from a bamboo plantation.
