= Mucilaginibacter oryzae =

Scientific classification
- Domain: Bacteria
- Kingdom: Pseudomonadati
- Phylum: Bacteroidota
- Class: Sphingobacteriia
- Order: Sphingobacteriales
- Family: Sphingobacteriaceae
- Genus: Mucilaginibacter
- Species: M. oryzae

Binomial name
- Mucilaginibacter oryzae Jeon et al. 2009

Type strain
- B9, DSM 19975, KACC 12816

Species of bacterium

Mucilaginibacter oryzae is a Gram-negative and non-spore-forming bacterium from the genus of Mucilaginibacter which has been isolated from rhizosphere soil from a rice plant (Oryza sativa) in Jinju in Korea.
