= Arcticibacter eurypsychrophilus =

Scientific classification
- Domain: Bacteria
- Kingdom: Pseudomonadati
- Phylum: Bacteroidota
- Class: Sphingobacteriia
- Order: Sphingobacteriales
- Family: Sphingobacteriaceae
- Genus: Arcticibacter
- Species: A. eurypsychrophilus

Binomial name
- Arcticibacter eurypsychrophilus Shen et al. 2015

Type strain
- MJ9-5, JCM 19862, KCTC 42008

Species of bacterium

Arcticibacter eurypsychrophilus is a Gram-negative and rod-shaped bacterium from the genus Arcticibacter which has been isolated from the ice core of the Muji Glacier.
