= Sphingobacterium yanglingense =

Scientific classification
- Domain: Bacteria
- Kingdom: Pseudomonadati
- Phylum: Bacteroidota
- Class: Sphingobacteriia
- Order: Sphingobacteriales
- Family: Sphingobacteriaceae
- Genus: Sphingobacterium
- Species: S. yanglingense

Binomial name
- Sphingobacterium yanglingense Peng et al. 2014

Type strain
- ACCC 19328, JCM 30166, CCNWSP36-1

Species of bacterium

Sphingobacterium yanglingense is a Gram-negative and non-motile bacterium from the genus Sphingobacterium which has been isolated from the root nodule surface of a soybean (Glycine max) in Yangling in China.
