= Sphingobacterium suaedae =

Scientific classification
- Domain: Bacteria
- Kingdom: Pseudomonadati
- Phylum: Bacteroidota
- Class: Sphingobacteriia
- Order: Sphingobacteriales
- Family: Sphingobacteriaceae
- Genus: Sphingobacterium
- Species: S. suaedae

Binomial name
- Sphingobacterium suaedae Sun et al. 2015

Type strain
- CGMCC 1.15277, KCTC 42662, T47

Synonyms
- Sphingobacterium bayannaoerense

Species of bacterium

Sphingobacterium suaedae is a Gram-negative, non-spore-forming and non-motile bacterium from the genus Sphingobacterium which has been isolated from rhizosphere soil from the plant Suaeda corniculata from the bank of the Wuliangsuhai Lake in the Inner Mongolia in China.
