= Pedobacter cryoconitis =

Scientific classification
- Domain: Bacteria
- Kingdom: Pseudomonadati
- Phylum: Bacteroidota
- Class: Sphingobacteriia
- Order: Sphingobacteriales
- Family: Sphingobacteriaceae
- Genus: Pedobacter
- Species: P. cryoconitis

Binomial name
- Pedobacter cryoconitis Margesin et al. 2003

Species of bacterium

Pedobacter cryoconitis is a species of bacteria. It is facultatively psychrophilic, Gram-negative, aerobic and rod-shaped strain, having been first isolated from alpine glacier cryoconite. It is also non-flagellated and non-spore-forming, with type strain A37^{T} (=DSM 14825^{T} =LMG 21415^{T}).
