= Sphingobacterium zeae =

Scientific classification
- Domain: Bacteria
- Kingdom: Pseudomonadati
- Phylum: Bacteroidota
- Class: Sphingobacteriia
- Order: Sphingobacteriales
- Family: Sphingobacteriaceae
- Genus: Sphingobacterium
- Species: S. zeae

Binomial name
- Sphingobacterium zeae Kämpfer et al. 2016

Type strain
- CCM 8652, LMG 29191, JM-1081

Species of bacterium

Sphingobacterium zeae is a Gram-negative and rod-shaped bacterium from the genus Sphingobacterium which has been isolated from stem tissue of a mays-plant (Zea mays).
