= Pseudopedobacter beijingensis =

Scientific classification
- Domain: Bacteria
- Kingdom: Pseudomonadati
- Phylum: Bacteroidota
- Class: Sphingobacteriia
- Order: Sphingobacteriales
- Family: Sphingobacteriaceae
- Genus: Pseudopedobacter
- Species: P. beijingensis

Binomial name
- Pseudopedobacter beijingensis Cao et al. 2014

Type strain
- CGMCC 1.12329, GCS-AE-31, LMG 27180, MCCC 1A01299

Species of bacterium

Pseudopedobacter beijingensis is a Gram-negative and motile bacterium from the genus of Pseudopedobacter.
