= Mucilaginibacter soyangensis =

Scientific classification
- Domain: Bacteria
- Kingdom: Pseudomonadati
- Phylum: Bacteroidota
- Class: Sphingobacteriia
- Order: Sphingobacteriales
- Family: Sphingobacteriaceae
- Genus: Mucilaginibacter
- Species: M. soyangensis

Binomial name
- Mucilaginibacter soyangensis Joung et al. 2014

Type strain
- CECT 7824, HME6664, KCTC 23261

Species of bacterium

Mucilaginibacter soyangensis is a non-motile bacterium from the genus of Mucilaginibacter which has been isolated from the Lake Soyang in Korea.
