= Anseongella ginsenosidimutans =

Scientific classification
- Domain: Bacteria
- Kingdom: Pseudomonadati
- Phylum: Bacteroidota
- Class: Sphingobacteriia
- Order: Sphingobacteriales
- Family: Sphingobacteriaceae
- Genus: Anseongella
- Species: A. ginsenosidimutans

Binomial name
- Anseongella ginsenosidimutans Siddiqi et al. 2016

Type strain
- KACC 14636, LMG 24494, Gsoil 524

Species of bacterium

Anseongella ginsenosidimutans is a Gram-negative, rod-shaped and non-spore-forming bacterium from the genus of Anseongella which has been isolated from soil from a ginseng field in Pocheon in Korea.
