= Sphingobacterium wenxiniae =

Scientific classification
- Domain: Bacteria
- Kingdom: Pseudomonadati
- Phylum: Bacteroidota
- Class: Sphingobacteriia
- Order: Sphingobacteriales
- Family: Sphingobacteriaceae
- Genus: Sphingobacterium
- Species: S. wenxiniae

Binomial name
- Sphingobacterium wenxiniae Zhang et al. 2012

Type strain
- ACCC 05410, CCTCC AB 2010005, KCTC 23009, LQY-18

Synonyms
- Parasphingobacterium wenxiniae

Species of bacterium

Sphingobacterium wenxiniae is a Gram-negative, non-spore-forming bacterium from the genus Sphingobacterium which has been isolated from activated sludge from a wastewater treatment plant in China. Sphingobacterium wenxiniae has the ability to degrade cypermethrin.
