= Sphingobacterium ginsenosidimutans =

Scientific classification
- Domain: Bacteria
- Kingdom: Pseudomonadati
- Phylum: Bacteroidota
- Class: Sphingobacteriia
- Order: Sphingobacteriales
- Family: Sphingobacteriaceae
- Genus: Sphingobacterium
- Species: S. ginsenosidimutans

Binomial name
- Sphingobacterium ginsenosidimutans Son et al. 2014

Type strain
- JCM 16722, KACC 14526, THG 07

Species of bacterium

Sphingobacterium ginsenosidimutans is a Gram-negative, aerobic, non-spore-forming, rod-shaped and non-motile bacterium from the genus Sphingobacterium which has been isolated from a ginseng field in Pocheon in Korea.
