= Mucilaginibacter pineti =

Scientific classification
- Domain: Bacteria
- Kingdom: Pseudomonadati
- Phylum: Bacteroidota
- Class: Sphingobacteriia
- Order: Sphingobacteriales
- Family: Sphingobacteriaceae
- Genus: Mucilaginibacter
- Species: M. pineti

Binomial name
- Mucilaginibacter pineti Paiva et al. 2014

Type strain
- CIP 110632, LMG 28160, M47C3B

Species of bacterium

Mucilaginibacter pineti is a gram-negative bacterium from the genus of Mucilaginibacter which has been isolated from wood from the tree Pinus pinaster.
