= Mucilaginibacter amnicola =

Scientific classification
- Domain: Bacteria
- Kingdom: Pseudomonadati
- Phylum: Bacteroidota
- Class: Sphingobacteriia
- Order: Sphingobacteriales
- Family: Sphingobacteriaceae
- Genus: Mucilaginibacter
- Species: M. amnicola

Binomial name
- Mucilaginibacter amnicola Chen et al. 2018

Type strain
- BCRC 80976, KCTC 52238, LMG 29556, strain TAPP7

Genus of bacteria

Mucilaginibacter angelicae is a Gram-negative, aerobic and short-rod-shaped bacterium from the genus of Mucilaginibacter which has been isolated from a freshwater creek in Taiwan.
