= Mucilaginibacter aquaedulcis =

Scientific classification
- Domain: Bacteria
- Kingdom: Pseudomonadati
- Phylum: Bacteroidota
- Class: Sphingobacteriia
- Order: Sphingobacteriales
- Family: Sphingobacteriaceae
- Genus: Mucilaginibacter
- Species: M. aquaedulcis

Binomial name
- Mucilaginibacter aquaedulcis Joung et al. 2015

Type strain
- CECT 8102, KCTC 23942, PGW1-R01

Species of bacterium

Mucilaginibacter aquaedulcis is a Gram-negative, aerobic and rod-shaped bacterium from the genus of Mucilaginibacter which has been isolated from fresh water in Yeongju in Korea.
