= Parapedobacter indicus =

Scientific classification
- Domain: Bacteria
- Kingdom: Pseudomonadati
- Phylum: Bacteroidota
- Class: Sphingobacteriia
- Order: Sphingobacteriales
- Family: Sphingobacteriaceae
- Genus: Parapedobacter
- Species: P. indicus

Binomial name
- Parapedobacter indicus Kumar et al. 2015

Type strain
- DSM 28470, MCC 2546, RK1

Species of bacterium

Parapedobacter indicus is a Gram-negative, non-spore-forming, rod-shaped and non-motile bacterium from the genus of Parapedobacter which has been isolated from soil from a hexachlorocyclohexane-contaminated dumpsite in Lucknow in India.
