= Mucilaginibacter polytrichastri =

Scientific classification
- Domain: Bacteria
- Kingdom: Pseudomonadati
- Phylum: Bacteroidota
- Class: Sphingobacteriia
- Order: Sphingobacteriales
- Family: Sphingobacteriaceae
- Genus: Mucilaginibacter
- Species: M. polytrichastri

Binomial name
- Mucilaginibacter polytrichastri Chen et al. 2014

Type strain
- CGMCC 1.12493, DSM 26907, RG4-7

Species of bacterium

Mucilaginibacter polytrichastri is a Gram-negative, non-spore-forming and rod-shaped bacterium from the genus of Mucilaginibacter which has been isolated from the moss Polytrichastrum formosum from the Gawalong glacier zone from the Tibetan Plateau in China.
