= Parapedobacter composti =

Scientific classification
- Domain: Bacteria
- Kingdom: Pseudomonadati
- Phylum: Bacteroidota
- Class: Sphingobacteriia
- Order: Sphingobacteriales
- Family: Sphingobacteriaceae
- Genus: Parapedobacter
- Species: P. composti

Binomial name
- Parapedobacter composti Kim et al. 2010

Type strain
- DSM 22900, JCM 15978, KACC 10972, 4M40

Synonyms
- Parapedobacter compostus

Species of bacterium

Parapedobacter composti is a Gram-negative and non-spore-forming bacterium from the genus of Parapedobacter which has been isolated from cotton waste compost in Suwon in Korea.
