= Pelobium manganitolerans =

Scientific classification
- Domain: Bacteria
- Kingdom: Pseudomonadati
- Phylum: Bacteroidota
- Class: Sphingobacteriia
- Order: Sphingobacteriales
- Family: Sphingobacteriaceae
- Genus: Pelobium
- Species: P. manganitolerans

Binomial name
- Pelobium manganitolerans Xia et al. 2016

Type strain
- CCTCC AB 2016051, KCTC 52203, YS-25

Species of bacterium

Pelobium manganitolerans is a Gram-negative, rod-shaped, facultative anaerobic and motile bacterium from the genus of Pelobium which has been isolated from sludge from a manganese mine.
