= Mucilaginibacter calamicampi =

Scientific classification
- Domain: Bacteria
- Kingdom: Pseudomonadati
- Phylum: Bacteroidota
- Class: Sphingobacteriia
- Order: Sphingobacteriales
- Family: Sphingobacteriaceae
- Genus: Mucilaginibacter
- Species: M. calamicampi

Binomial name
- Mucilaginibacter calamicampi Yoon et al. 2013

Type strain
- CCUG 63418, KCTC 32214, WR-R1Y

Species of bacterium

Mucilaginibacter calamicampi is a Gram-negative, aerobic and rod-shaped bacterium from the genus of Mucilaginibacter which has been isolated from soil from a reed field in Korea.
