= Mucilaginibacter carri =

Scientific classification
- Domain: Bacteria
- Kingdom: Pseudomonadati
- Phylum: Bacteroidota
- Class: Sphingobacteriia
- Order: Sphingobacteriales
- Family: Sphingobacteriaceae
- Genus: Mucilaginibacter
- Species: M. carri

Binomial name
- Mucilaginibacter carri Kim et al. 2016

Type strain
- KACC 17938, NBRC 111539, PR0008K

Species of bacterium

Mucilaginibacter carri is a Gram-negative, rod-shaped and obligately aerobic bacterium from the genus of Mucilaginibacter which has been isolated from a car air conditioning system in Korea.
