= Sphingobacterium alimentarium =

Scientific classification
- Domain: Bacteria
- Kingdom: Pseudomonadati
- Phylum: Bacteroidota
- Class: Sphingobacteriia
- Order: Sphingobacteriales
- Family: Sphingobacteriaceae
- Genus: Sphingobacterium
- Species: S. alimentarium

Binomial name
- Sphingobacterium alimentarium Schmidt et al. 2012

Type strain
- DSM 22362, DSM 22632, LMG 25273, WCC 4521

Species of bacterium

Sphingobacterium alimentarium is a Gram-negative and rod-shaped bacterium from the genus Sphingobacterium which has been isolated from a dairy environment in Germany.
