= Mucilaginibacter boryungensis =

Scientific classification
- Domain: Bacteria
- Kingdom: Pseudomonadati
- Phylum: Bacteroidota
- Class: Sphingobacteriia
- Order: Sphingobacteriales
- Family: Sphingobacteriaceae
- Genus: Mucilaginibacter
- Species: M. boryungensis

Binomial name
- Mucilaginibacter boryungensis Kang et al. 2011

Type strain
- CCUG 59599, KCTC 23157, BDR-9

Species of bacterium

Mucilaginibacter boryungensis is a Gram-negative, non-spore-forming and non-motile bacterium from the genus of Mucilaginibacter which has been isolated from soil from the west coast of Boryeong on Korea.
