= Mucilaginibacter roseus =

Scientific classification
- Domain: Bacteria
- Kingdom: Pseudomonadati
- Phylum: Bacteroidota
- Class: Sphingobacteriia
- Order: Sphingobacteriales
- Family: Sphingobacteriaceae
- Genus: Mucilaginibacter
- Species: M. roseus

Binomial name
- Mucilaginibacter roseus Chen et al. 2016

Type strain
- KCTC 42273, LMG 28454, TTM-1

Species of bacterium

Mucilaginibacter roseus is a Gram-negative, aerobic, rod-shaped and non-motile bacterium from the genus of Mucilaginibacter which has been isolated from the Caohu River in Taiwan.
