= Mucilaginibacter ginsengisoli =

Scientific classification
- Domain: Bacteria
- Kingdom: Pseudomonadati
- Phylum: Bacteroidota
- Class: Sphingobacteriia
- Order: Sphingobacteriales
- Family: Sphingobacteriaceae
- Genus: Mucilaginibacter
- Species: M. ginsengisoli

Binomial name
- Mucilaginibacter ginsengisoli Ahn et al. 2015

Species of bacterium

Mucilaginibacter ginsengisoli is a Gram-negative, strictly aerobic, short-rod-shaped and non-motile bacterium from the genus of Mucilaginibacter which has been isolated from soil which was cultivated with ginseng.
