= Sphingobacterium composti =

Scientific classification
- Domain: Bacteria
- Kingdom: Pseudomonadati
- Phylum: Bacteroidota
- Class: Sphingobacteriia
- Order: Sphingobacteriales
- Family: Sphingobacteriaceae
- Genus: Sphingobacterium
- Species: S. composti

Binomial name
- Sphingobacterium composti Ten et al. 2007

Type strain
- CCUG 52467, KCTC 12578, LMG 23401, T5-12, VTT E-072691

Synonyms
- Sphingobacterium composta

Species of bacterium

Sphingobacterium composti is a Gram-negative, strictly aerobic, short rod-shaped and non-motile bacterium from the genus Sphingobacterium which has been isolated from cotton waste compost in Korea.
