= Sphingobacterium hotanense =

Scientific classification
- Domain: Bacteria
- Kingdom: Pseudomonadati
- Phylum: Bacteroidota
- Class: Sphingobacteriia
- Order: Sphingobacteriales
- Family: Sphingobacteriaceae
- Genus: Sphingobacterium
- Species: S. hotanense

Binomial name
- Sphingobacterium hotanense Xiao et al. 2013

Type strain
- CCTCC AB 209007, NRRL B-59204, XH4

Synonyms
- Sphingobacterium populus

Species of bacterium

Sphingobacterium hotanense is a Gram-negative, strictly aerobic and non-motile bacterium from the genus Sphingobacterium which has been isolated from the Populus euphratica forest from the Hotan River valley in China.
