= Mucilaginibacter myungsuensis =

Scientific classification
- Domain: Bacteria
- Kingdom: Pseudomonadati
- Phylum: Bacteroidota
- Class: Sphingobacteriia
- Order: Sphingobacteriales
- Family: Sphingobacteriaceae
- Genus: Mucilaginibacter
- Species: M. myungsuensis

Binomial name
- Mucilaginibacter myungsuensis Joung and Joh 2011

Type strain
- CECT 7550, HMD1056, KCTC 22746

Species of bacterium

Mucilaginibacter myungsuensis is a non-motile, gram-negative bacterium from the genus of Mucilaginibacter which has been isolated from a mesotrophic lake near the campus of Hankuk University of Foreign Studies in Yongin in Korea.
