= Mucilaginibacter rubeus =

Scientific classification
- Domain: Bacteria
- Kingdom: Pseudomonadati
- Phylum: Bacteroidota
- Class: Sphingobacteriia
- Order: Sphingobacteriales
- Family: Sphingobacteriaceae
- Genus: Mucilaginibacter
- Species: M. rubeus

Binomial name
- Mucilaginibacter rubeus Wei et al. 2017

Type strain
- CGMCC 1.15913, KCTC 52516, strain EF23

Genus of bacteria

Mucilaginibacter rubeus is a gram-negative bacterium from the genus of Mucilaginibacter which has been isolated from a gold and copper mine from Longyan in China.
