= Mucilaginibacter psychrotolerans =

Scientific classification
- Domain: Bacteria
- Kingdom: Pseudomonadati
- Phylum: Bacteroidota
- Class: Sphingobacteriia
- Order: Sphingobacteriales
- Family: Sphingobacteriaceae
- Genus: Mucilaginibacter
- Species: M. psychrotolerans

Binomial name
- Mucilaginibacter psychrotolerans Deng et al. 2017

Type strain
- CGMCC 1.14937, JCM 30607, strain NH7-4

Genus of bacteria

Mucilaginibacter psychrotolerans is a psychrotolerant, Gram-negative and rod-shaped bacterium from the genus of Mucilaginibacter which has been isolated from the Riganqiao peatlands from the Tibetan Plateau.
