= Olivibacter ginsenosidimutans =

Scientific classification
- Domain: Bacteria
- Kingdom: Pseudomonadati
- Phylum: Bacteroidota
- Class: Sphingobacteriia
- Order: Sphingobacteriales
- Family: Sphingobacteriaceae
- Genus: Olivibacter
- Species: O. ginsenosidimutans

Binomial name
- Olivibacter ginsenosidimutans Siddiqi et al. 2018

Type strain
- JCM 18200, KACC 16612, strain BS18

Species of bacterium

Olivibacter ginsenosidimutans is a Gram-negative, aerobic and rod-shaped bacterium from the genus of Olivibacter which has been isolated from compost.
