= Mucilaginibacter gynuensis =

Scientific classification
- Domain: Bacteria
- Kingdom: Pseudomonadati
- Phylum: Bacteroidota
- Class: Sphingobacteriia
- Order: Sphingobacteriales
- Family: Sphingobacteriaceae
- Genus: Mucilaginibacter
- Species: M. gynuensis

Binomial name
- Mucilaginibacter gynuensis Khan et al. 2013

Type strain
- JCM 17705, KACC 15532, YC7003

Species of bacterium

Mucilaginibacter gynuensis is a Gram-negative, aerobic and rod-shaped bacterium from the genus of Mucilaginibacter which has been isolated from rotten wood in Jinju in Korea.
