= Mucilaginibacter auburnensis =

Scientific classification
- Domain: Bacteria
- Kingdom: Pseudomonadati
- Phylum: Bacteroidota
- Class: Sphingobacteriia
- Order: Sphingobacteriales
- Family: Sphingobacteriaceae
- Genus: Mucilaginibacter
- Species: M. auburnensis

Binomial name
- Mucilaginibacter auburnensis Kämpfer et al. 2014

Type strain
- CIP 110694, JM-1070, LMG 28078

Species of bacterium

Mucilaginibacter auburnensis is a Gram-negative, rod-shaped and non-spore-forming bacterium from the genus of Mucilaginibacter which has been isolated from the stem from a corn plant Zea mays from the field of E. V. Smith Research Center, Plant Breeding Unit facility in Tallassee in the United States.
