= Mucilaginibacter flavus =

Scientific classification
- Domain: Bacteria
- Kingdom: Pseudomonadati
- Phylum: Bacteroidota
- Class: Sphingobacteriia
- Order: Sphingobacteriales
- Family: Sphingobacteriaceae
- Genus: Mucilaginibacter
- Species: M. flavus

Binomial name
- Mucilaginibacter flavus Joung et al. 2014

Type strain
- CECT 7857, HME6839, KCTC 23441

Species of bacterium

Mucilaginibacter flavus is a species of gram-negative bacterium from the genus of Mucilaginibacter which has been isolated from wetland from the Jeju Island in Korea.
