= Sphingobacterium chuzhouense =

Scientific classification
- Domain: Bacteria
- Kingdom: Pseudomonadati
- Phylum: Bacteroidota
- Class: Sphingobacteriia
- Order: Sphingobacteriales
- Family: Sphingobacteriaceae
- Genus: Sphingobacterium
- Species: S. chuzhouense

Binomial name
- Sphingobacterium chuzhouense Wang et al. 2016

Type strain
- ACCC 19856, KCTC 42746, DH-5

Species of bacterium

Sphingobacterium chuzhouense is a Gram-negative, aerobic, rod-shaped, non-spore-forming and non-motile bacterium from the genus Sphingobacterium which has been isolated from farmland soil from Chuzhouin China.
