= Mucilaginibacter litoreus =

Scientific classification
- Domain: Bacteria
- Kingdom: Pseudomonadati
- Phylum: Bacteroidota
- Class: Sphingobacteriia
- Order: Sphingobacteriales
- Family: Sphingobacteriaceae
- Genus: Mucilaginibacter
- Species: M. litoreus

Binomial name
- Mucilaginibacter litoreus Yoon et al. 2012

Type strain
- CCUG 61484, KCTC 23697, BR-18

Species of bacterium

Mucilaginibacter litoreus is a Gram-negative, facultatively aerobic, non-spore-forming and rod-shaped bacterium from the genus of Mucilaginibacter which has been isolated from marine sand from the western coast of Korea.
