= Mucilaginibacter sabulilitoris =

Scientific classification
- Domain: Bacteria
- Kingdom: Pseudomonadati
- Phylum: Bacteroidota
- Class: Sphingobacteriia
- Order: Sphingobacteriales
- Family: Sphingobacteriaceae
- Genus: Mucilaginibacter
- Species: M. sabulilitoris

Binomial name
- Mucilaginibacter sabulilitoris Kang et al. 2013

Type strain
- CCUG 62214, KCTC 32111, SMS-12

Synonyms
- Muclilaginibacter sabulilitoris

Species of bacterium

Mucilaginibacter sabulilitoris is a Gram-negative, strictly aerobic, non-spore-forming and rod-shaped bacterium from the genus of Mucilaginibacter which has been isolated from marine sand.
