= Solitalea canadensis =

Scientific classification
- Domain: Bacteria
- Kingdom: Pseudomonadati
- Phylum: Bacteroidota
- Class: Sphingobacteriia
- Order: Sphingobacteriales
- Family: Sphingobacteriaceae
- Genus: Solitalea
- Species: S. canadensis

Binomial name
- Solitalea canadensis (Christensen 1980) Weon et al. 2009

Type strain
- ATCC 29591, CIP 104802, DSM 3403, IAM 15375, IFO 15130, JCM 21819, KACC 13276, LMG 8368, NBRC 15130, NCIB 12057, NCIMB 12057, UASM 9 D

Synonyms
- Flexibacter canadensis

Species of bacterium

Solitalea canadensis is a bacterium from the genus of Solitalea which has been isolated from soil in Canada.
