= Mucilaginibacter antarcticus =

Scientific classification
- Domain: Bacteria
- Kingdom: Pseudomonadati
- Phylum: Bacteroidota
- Class: Sphingobacteriia
- Order: Sphingobacteriales
- Family: Sphingobacteriaceae
- Genus: Mucilaginibacter
- Species: M. antarcticus

Binomial name
- Mucilaginibacter antarcticus Zheng et al. 2016

Type strain
- CCTCC AB 2015321, KCTC 52232, S14-88

Species of bacterium

Mucilaginibacter antarcticus is a Gram-negative, rod-shaped, anaerobic and non-motile bacterium from the genus Mucilaginibacter which has been isolated from soil near Antarctic Peninsula.
