= Pedobacter africanus =

Scientific classification
- Domain: Bacteria
- Kingdom: Pseudomonadati
- Phylum: Bacteroidota
- Class: Sphingobacteriia
- Order: Sphingobacteriales
- Family: Sphingobacteriaceae
- Genus: Pedobacter
- Species: P. africanus

Binomial name
- Pedobacter africanus Steyn et al. 1998

Species of bacterium

Pedobacter africanus is a species of heparinase-producing bacteria.
