= Parapedobacter defluvii =

Scientific classification
- Domain: Bacteria
- Kingdom: Pseudomonadati
- Phylum: Bacteroidota
- Class: Sphingobacteriia
- Order: Sphingobacteriales
- Family: Sphingobacteriaceae
- Genus: Parapedobacter
- Species: P. defluvii

Binomial name
- Parapedobacter defluvii Yang et al. 2017

Type strain
- CGMCC 1.15342, NBRC 112611, strain WY-1

Genus of bacteria

Parapedobacter defluvii is a Gram-negative, non-spore-forming, rod-shaped and non-motile bacterium from the genus of Parapedobacter.
