= Sphingobacterium kyonggiense =

Scientific classification
- Domain: Bacteria
- Kingdom: Pseudomonadati
- Phylum: Bacteroidota
- Class: Sphingobacteriia
- Order: Sphingobacteriales
- Family: Sphingobacteriaceae
- Genus: Sphingobacterium
- Species: S. kyonggiense

Binomial name
- Sphingobacterium kyonggiense Choi and Lee 2012

Type strain
- JCM 16704, KEMC 2241-005, 2-1-2

Species of bacterium

Sphingobacterium kyonggiense is a Gram-negative, strictly aerobic, rod-shaped and non-motile bacterium from the genus Sphingobacterium which has been isolated from soil contaminated with trichloroethene in Suwon in Korea.
