= Sphingobacterium detergens =

Scientific classification
- Domain: Bacteria
- Kingdom: Pseudomonadati
- Phylum: Bacteroidota
- Class: Sphingobacteriia
- Order: Sphingobacteriales
- Family: Sphingobacteriaceae
- Genus: Sphingobacterium
- Species: S. detergens

Binomial name
- Sphingobacterium detergens Marqués et al. 2012

Type strain
- 6.2S, CECT 7938, LMG 26465

Species of bacterium

Sphingobacterium detergens is a Gram-negative bacterium from the genus Sphingobacterium which has been isolated from soil. Sphingobacterium detergens produces surfactant.
