= Pedobacter lentus =

Scientific classification
- Domain: Bacteria
- Kingdom: Pseudomonadati
- Phylum: Bacteroidota
- Class: Sphingobacteriia
- Order: Sphingobacteriales
- Family: Sphingobacteriaceae
- Genus: Pedobacter
- Species: P. lentus

Binomial name
- Pedobacter lentus Yoon et al. 2007

Species of bacterium

Pedobacter lentus is a species of Gram-negative, non-motile, pleomorphic bacteria. Its type strain is DS-40(T) (=KCTC 12875(T) =JCM 14593(T)).
