= Olivibacter composti =

Scientific classification
- Domain: Bacteria
- Kingdom: Pseudomonadati
- Phylum: Bacteroidota
- Class: Sphingobacteriia
- Order: Sphingobacteriales
- Family: Sphingobacteriaceae
- Genus: Olivibacter
- Species: O. composti

Binomial name
- Olivibacter composti Lin et al. 2017

Type strain
- BCRC 80939, JCM 31198, CC-KYC063

Species of bacterium

Olivibacter composti is a Gram-negative and aerobic bacterium from the genus of Olivibacter which has been isolated from compost from a greenhouse in Taiwan.
