= Sphingobacterium pakistanense =

Scientific classification
- Domain: Bacteria
- Kingdom: Pseudomonadati
- Phylum: Bacteroidota
- Class: Sphingobacteriia
- Order: Sphingobacteriales
- Family: Sphingobacteriaceae
- Genus: Sphingobacterium
- Species: S. pakistanense

Binomial name
- Sphingobacterium pakistanense Ahmed et al. 2015

Type strain
- JCM 18974, KCTC 23914, NCCP-246

Synonyms
- Sphingobacterium pakistanensis

Species of bacterium

Sphingobacterium pakistanense is a Gram-negative, strictly aerobic and non-motile bacterium from the genus Sphingobacterium which has been isolated from the rhizosphere of the plant Vigna mungo in Pakistan. Sphingobacterium pakistanense is a plant growth promoting bacterium.
