= Mucilaginibacter angelicae =

Scientific classification
- Domain: Bacteria
- Kingdom: Pseudomonadati
- Phylum: Bacteroidota
- Class: Sphingobacteriia
- Order: Sphingobacteriales
- Family: Sphingobacteriaceae
- Genus: Mucilaginibacter
- Species: M. angelicae

Binomial name
- Mucilaginibacter angelicae Kim et al. 2012

Type strain
- KCTC 23250, GG-w14, NCAIM B 02415

Species of bacterium

Mucilaginibacter angelicae is a Gram-negative and non-motile bacterium from the genus of Mucilaginibacter which has been isolated from the rhizosphere of the plant Angelica polymorpha.
