= Mucilaginibacter koreensis =

Scientific classification
- Domain: Bacteria
- Kingdom: Pseudomonadati
- Phylum: Bacteroidota
- Class: Sphingobacteriia
- Order: Sphingobacteriales
- Family: Sphingobacteriaceae
- Genus: Mucilaginibacter
- Species: M. koreensis

Binomial name
- Mucilaginibacter koreensis Park et al. 2014

Type strain
- JCM 19323, KACC 17468, TF8

Species of bacterium

Mucilaginibacter koreensis is a Gram-negative and strictly aerobic bacterium from the genus of Mucilaginibacter which has been isolated from leaf mold in Cheonan in Korea.
