= Sphingobacterium anhuiense =

Scientific classification
- Domain: Bacteria
- Kingdom: Pseudomonadati
- Phylum: Bacteroidota
- Class: Sphingobacteriia
- Order: Sphingobacteriales
- Family: Sphingobacteriaceae
- Genus: Sphingobacterium
- Species: S. anhuiense

Binomial name
- Sphingobacterium anhuiense Wei et al. 2008

Type strain
- CCTCC AB 207197, CW 186, KCTC 22209, LMG 24450

Synonyms
- Sphingobacterium anhuiensis

Species of bacterium

Sphingobacterium anhuiense is a Gram-negative, strictly aerobic, rod-shaped and non-motile bacterium from the genus Sphingobacterium which has been isolated from forest soil in the Anhui province in China.
