= Mucilaginibacter polysacchareus =

Scientific classification
- Domain: Bacteria
- Kingdom: Pseudomonadati
- Phylum: Bacteroidota
- Class: Sphingobacteriia
- Order: Sphingobacteriales
- Family: Sphingobacteriaceae
- Genus: Mucilaginibacter
- Species: M. polysacchareus

Binomial name
- Mucilaginibacter polysacchareus Han et al. 2012

Type strain
- KACC 15075, DRP28, DRP29, DRP31, NBRC 107757

Species of bacterium

Mucilaginibacter polysacchareus is a Gram-negative, aerobic and non-motile bacterium from the genus of Mucilaginibacter which has been isolated from the rhizoplane of the plant Angelica sinensis in Geumsan in Korea. Mucilaginibacter polysacchareus produces exopolysaccharide.
