= Sphingobacterium cladoniae =

Scientific classification
- Domain: Bacteria
- Kingdom: Pseudomonadati
- Phylum: Bacteroidota
- Class: Sphingobacteriia
- Order: Sphingobacteriales
- Family: Sphingobacteriaceae
- Genus: Sphingobacterium
- Species: S. cladoniae

Binomial name
- Sphingobacterium cladoniae Lee et al. 2013

Type strain
- JCM 16113, KCTC 22613, No.6

Species of bacterium

Sphingobacterium cladoniae is a Gram-negative and strictly aerobic bacterium from the genus Sphingobacterium which has been isolated from the lichen Cladonia from the Geogeum Island in Korea.
