= Mucilaginibacter composti =

Scientific classification
- Domain: Bacteria
- Kingdom: Pseudomonadati
- Phylum: Bacteroidota
- Class: Sphingobacteriia
- Order: Sphingobacteriales
- Family: Sphingobacteriaceae
- Genus: Mucilaginibacter
- Species: M. composti

Binomial name
- Mucilaginibacter composti Cui et al. 2011

Type strain
- KACC 14956, KACC 19456, KCTC 12642, Lee TR6-03, LMG 23497, TR6-03

Species of bacterium

Mucilaginibacter composti is a Gram-negative, strictly aerobic rod-shaped, non-spore-forming and non-motile bacterium from the genus of Mucilaginibacter which has been isolated from compost.
