= Sphingobacterium nematocida =

Scientific classification
- Domain: Bacteria
- Kingdom: Pseudomonadati
- Phylum: Bacteroidota
- Class: Sphingobacteriia
- Order: Sphingobacteriales
- Family: Sphingobacteriaceae
- Genus: Sphingobacterium
- Species: S. nematocida

Binomial name
- Sphingobacterium nematocida Liu et al. 2012

Type strain
- CCTCC AB 2010390, JCM 17339, M-SX103

Species of bacterium

Sphingobacterium nematocida is a Gram-negative bacterium from the genus Sphingobacterium which has been isolated from the tobacco-plant Nicotiana tabacum in Yuxi in China.
