= Mucilaginibacter kameinonensis =

Scientific classification
- Domain: Bacteria
- Kingdom: Pseudomonadati
- Phylum: Bacteroidota
- Class: Sphingobacteriia
- Order: Sphingobacteriales
- Family: Sphingobacteriaceae
- Genus: Mucilaginibacter
- Species: M. kameinonensis

Binomial name
- Mucilaginibacter kameinonensis Urai et al. 2008

Type strain
- KCTC 22227, NBRC 102645, SCK

Species of bacterium

Mucilaginibacter kameinonensis is a Gram-negative and non-motile bacterium from the genus of Mucilaginibacter which has been isolated from garden soil from Kameino in Fujisawa in Japan.
