= Parapedobacter lycopersici =

Scientific classification
- Domain: Bacteria
- Kingdom: Pseudomonadati
- Phylum: Bacteroidota
- Class: Sphingobacteriia
- Order: Sphingobacteriales
- Family: Sphingobacteriaceae
- Genus: Parapedobacter
- Species: P. lycopersici

Binomial name
- Parapedobacter lycopersici Kim et al. 2017

Type strain
- JCM 31602, KACC 18788, strain T16R-256

Genus of bacteria

Parapedobacter lycopersici is a Gram-negative, aerobic and rod-shaped bacterium from the genus of Parapedobacter which has been isolated from the rhizospheric soil from a tomato plant from a greenhouse from Yecheon-gun in Korea.
