= Sphingobacterium daejeonense =

Scientific classification
- Domain: Bacteria
- Kingdom: Pseudomonadati
- Phylum: Bacteroidota
- Class: Sphingobacteriia
- Order: Sphingobacteriales
- Family: Sphingobacteriaceae
- Genus: Sphingobacterium
- Species: S. daejeonense

Binomial name
- Sphingobacterium daejeonense Kim et al. 2006

Type strain
- CCUG 52468, CIP 109390, KCTC 12579, LMG 23402, LMG 23402 TR6-04

Species of bacterium

Sphingobacterium daejeonense is a Gram-negative, strictly aerobic, non-spore-forming and non-motile bacterium from the genus Sphingobacterium which has been isolated from compost.
