= Parapedobacter pyrenivorans =

Scientific classification
- Domain: Bacteria
- Kingdom: Pseudomonadati
- Phylum: Bacteroidota
- Class: Sphingobacteriia
- Order: Sphingobacteriales
- Family: Sphingobacteriaceae
- Genus: Parapedobacter
- Species: P. pyrenivorans

Binomial name
- Parapedobacter pyrenivorans Zhao et al. 2013

Type strain
- CGMCC 1.12195, NBRC 109113, P4

Species of bacterium

Parapedobacter pyrenivorans is a Gram-negative and non-motile bacterium from the genus of Parapedobacter. Parapedobacter pyrenivorans has the ability to degrade pyrene.
