= Sphingobacterium shayense =

Scientific classification
- Domain: Bacteria
- Kingdom: Pseudomonadati
- Phylum: Bacteroidota
- Class: Sphingobacteriia
- Order: Sphingobacteriales
- Family: Sphingobacteriaceae
- Genus: Sphingobacterium
- Species: S. shayense

Binomial name
- Sphingobacterium shayense He et al. 2010

Type strain
- CCTCC AB 209006, HS39, NRRL B-59203

Species of bacterium

Sphingobacterium shayense is a bacterium from the genus Sphingobacterium which has been isolated from forest soil from a Populus euphratica forest in Xinjiang in China.
