= Sphingobacterium canadense =

Scientific classification
- Domain: Bacteria
- Kingdom: Pseudomonadati
- Phylum: Bacteroidota
- Class: Sphingobacteriia
- Order: Sphingobacteriales
- Family: Sphingobacteriaceae
- Genus: Sphingobacterium
- Species: S. canadense

Binomial name
- Sphingobacterium canadense Mehnaz et al. 2008

Type strain
- LMG 23727, NCCB 100125, CR11

Species of bacterium

Sphingobacterium canadense is a Gram-negative bacterium from the genus Sphingobacterium which has been isolated from corn roots.
