= Sphingobacterium psychroaquaticum =

Scientific classification
- Domain: Bacteria
- Kingdom: Pseudomonadati
- Phylum: Bacteroidota
- Class: Sphingobacteriia
- Order: Sphingobacteriales
- Family: Sphingobacteriaceae
- Genus: Sphingobacterium
- Species: S. psychroaquaticum

Binomial name
- Sphingobacterium psychroaquaticum Albert et al. 2013

Type strain
- DSM 22418, MOL-1, NRRL B-59232

Synonyms
- Sphingobacterium aquatica

Species of bacterium

Sphingobacterium psychroaquaticum is a Gram-negative and psychrophilic bacterium from the genus Sphingobacterium which has been isolated from lake water from the Lake Michigan in Wisconsin in the United States.
