= Sphingobacterium griseoflavum =

Scientific classification
- Domain: Bacteria
- Kingdom: Pseudomonadati
- Phylum: Bacteroidota
- Class: Sphingobacteriia
- Order: Sphingobacteriales
- Family: Sphingobacteriaceae
- Genus: Sphingobacterium
- Species: S. griseoflavum

Binomial name
- Sphingobacterium griseoflavum Long et al. 2016

Type strain
- CGMCC 1.12966, KCTC 42158, SCU-B140

Species of bacterium

Sphingobacterium griseoflavum is a Gram-negative, aerobic, rod-shaped and non-motile bacterium from the genus Sphingobacterium which has been isolated from the cricket Teleogryllus occipitalis.
