= Pedobacter nyackensis =

Scientific classification
- Domain: Bacteria
- Kingdom: Pseudomonadati
- Phylum: Bacteroidota
- Class: Sphingobacteriia
- Order: Sphingobacteriales
- Family: Sphingobacteriaceae
- Genus: Pedobacter
- Species: P. nyackensis

Binomial name
- Pedobacter nyackensis Gordon et al. 2009

Species of bacterium

Pedobacter nyackensis is a species of Gram-negative, rod-shaped, non-spore-forming eubacterial species. Its type strain is (NWG-II14(T) =DSM 19625(T) =LMG 24260(T)).
