= Parapedobacter soli =

Scientific classification
- Domain: Bacteria
- Kingdom: Pseudomonadati
- Phylum: Bacteroidota
- Class: Sphingobacteriia
- Order: Sphingobacteriales
- Family: Sphingobacteriaceae
- Genus: Parapedobacter
- Species: P. soli

Binomial name
- Parapedobacter soli Kim et al. 2008

Type strain
- DCY14, KCTC 12984, LMG 24069

Species of bacterium

Parapedobacter soli is a Gram-negative, non-spore-forming, rod-shaped, and non-motile bacterium from the genus Parapedobacter which has been isolated from soil from a ginseng field in Korea.
