= Mucilaginibacter daejeonensis =

Scientific classification
- Domain: Bacteria
- Kingdom: Pseudomonadati
- Phylum: Bacteroidota
- Class: Sphingobacteriia
- Order: Sphingobacteriales
- Family: Sphingobacteriaceae
- Genus: Mucilaginibacter
- Species: M. daejeonensis

Binomial name
- Mucilaginibacter daejeonensis An et al. 2009

Type strain
- Jip 10, KCTC 12639, LMG 23488

Species of bacterium

Mucilaginibacter daejeonensis is a Gram-negative, facultatively aerobic, heterotrophic, non-spore-forming, rod-shaped and non-motile bacterium from the genus of Mucilaginibacter which has been isolated from a dried rice straw.
