= Mucilaginibacter rigui =

Scientific classification
- Domain: Bacteria
- Kingdom: Pseudomonadati
- Phylum: Bacteroidota
- Class: Sphingobacteriia
- Order: Sphingobacteriales
- Family: Sphingobacteriaceae
- Genus: Mucilaginibacter
- Species: M. rigui

Binomial name
- Mucilaginibacter rigui Baik et al. 2010

Type strain
- KCTC 12534, WPCB133, NBRC 101115

Species of bacterium

Mucilaginibacter rigui is a Gram-negative, aerobic, rod-shaped and non-motile bacterium from the genus of Mucilaginibacter which has been isolated from freshwater from the Woopo wetland in Korea.
