= Pedobacter insulae =

Scientific classification
- Domain: Bacteria
- Kingdom: Pseudomonadati
- Phylum: Bacteroidota
- Class: Sphingobacteriia
- Order: Sphingobacteriales
- Family: Sphingobacteriaceae
- Genus: Pedobacter
- Species: P. insulae

Binomial name
- Pedobacter insulae Yoon et al. 2007

Species of bacterium

Pedobacter insulae is a species of bacteria. It is Gram-negative, non-motile and rod-shaped, with type strain DS-139(T) (=KCTC 12820(T) =DSM 18684(T)).
