= Mucilaginibacter herbaticus =

Scientific classification
- Domain: Bacteria
- Kingdom: Pseudomonadati
- Phylum: Bacteroidota
- Class: Sphingobacteriia
- Order: Sphingobacteriales
- Family: Sphingobacteriaceae
- Genus: Mucilaginibacter
- Species: M. herbaticus

Binomial name
- Mucilaginibacter herbaticus Lee et al. 2013

Type strain
- DR-9, KACC 16469, NBRC 108839

Species of bacterium

Mucilaginibacter herbaticus is a Gram-negative, strictly aerobic, rod-shaped and non-motile bacterium from the genus of Mucilaginibacter which has been isolated from rhizosphere soil from the plant Angelica sinensis.
