= Mucilaginibacter paludis =

Scientific classification
- Domain: Bacteria
- Kingdom: Pseudomonadati
- Phylum: Bacteroidota
- Class: Sphingobacteriia
- Order: Sphingobacteriales
- Family: Sphingobacteriaceae
- Genus: Mucilaginibacter
- Species: M. paludis

Binomial name
- Mucilaginibacter paludis Pankratov et al. 2007

Type strain
- ATCC BAA-1394, DSM 18603, TPT56, VKM B-2446

Species of bacterium

Mucilaginibacter paludis is a facultatively aerobic and heterotrophic bacterium from the genus of Mucilaginibacter which has been isolated from acidic Sphagnum peat bog in western Siberia in Russia. Mucilaginibacter paludis has the ability to degrade pectin, xylan and laminarin.
