= Olivibacter oleidegradans =

Scientific classification
- Domain: Bacteria
- Kingdom: Pseudomonadati
- Phylum: Bacteroidota
- Class: Sphingobacteriia
- Order: Sphingobacteriales
- Family: Sphingobacteriaceae
- Genus: Olivibacter
- Species: O. oleidegradans

Binomial name
- Olivibacter oleidegradans Szabó et al. 2011

Type strain
- CCM 7765, NCAIM B 02393, NCAIMB 02393, TBF2/20.2

Synonyms
- Olivibacter petrodegradans

Species of bacterium

Olivibacter oleidegradans is a Gram-negative, obligately aerobic, non-spore-forming, rod-shaped and non-motile bacterium from the genus of Olivibacter which has been isolated from a biofilter in Hungary. Olivibacter oleidegradans has the ability to degrade hydrocarbon.
