= Sphingobacterium siyangense =

Scientific classification
- Domain: Bacteria
- Kingdom: Pseudomonadati
- Phylum: Bacteroidota
- Class: Sphingobacteriia
- Order: Sphingobacteriales
- Family: Sphingobacteriaceae
- Genus: Sphingobacterium
- Species: S. siyangense

Binomial name
- Sphingobacterium siyangense Liu et al. 2008

Type strain
- CGMCC 1.6855, JCM 14866, KCTC 22131, SY1

Synonyms
- Sphingobacterium siyangensis

Species of bacterium

Sphingobacterium siyangense is a Gram-negative, non-spore-forming and non-motile bacterium from the genus Sphingobacterium which has been isolated from soil from Jiangsu in China.
