= Mucilaginibacter galii =

Scientific classification
- Domain: Bacteria
- Kingdom: Pseudomonadati
- Phylum: Bacteroidota
- Class: Sphingobacteriia
- Order: Sphingobacteriales
- Family: Sphingobacteriaceae
- Genus: Mucilaginibacter
- Species: M. galii

Binomial name
- Mucilaginibacter galii Aydogan et al. 2017

Type strain
- CCM 8711, CIP 111182, LMG 29767, strain PP-F2F-G47

Genus of bacteria

Mucilaginibacter galii is a Gram-negative, non-spore-forming and rod-shaped bacterium from the genus of Mucilaginibacter which has been isolated from leaves of the plant Galium album.
