= Sphingobacterium changzhouense =

Scientific classification
- Domain: Bacteria
- Kingdom: Pseudomonadati
- Phylum: Bacteroidota
- Class: Sphingobacteriia
- Order: Sphingobacteriales
- Family: Sphingobacteriaceae
- Genus: Sphingobacterium
- Species: S. changzhouense

Binomial name
- Sphingobacterium changzhouense Liu et al. 2013

Type strain
- CCTCC AB 2012100, KACC 16854, N7

Species of bacterium

Sphingobacterium changzhouense is a Gram-negative, non-spore-forming and rod-shaped bacterium from the genus Sphingobacterium which has been isolated from soil from a rice field in Jiangsu in China.
