= Sphingobacterium thermophilum =

Scientific classification
- Domain: Bacteria
- Kingdom: Pseudomonadati
- Phylum: Bacteroidota
- Class: Sphingobacteriia
- Order: Sphingobacteriales
- Family: Sphingobacteriaceae
- Genus: Sphingobacterium
- Species: S. thermophilum

Binomial name
- Sphingobacterium thermophilum Yabe et al. 2013

Type strain
- JCM 17858, KCTC 23708, CKTN2

Species of bacterium

Sphingobacterium thermophilum is a Gram-negative and strictly aerobic bacterium from the genus Sphingobacterium which has been isolated from compost.
