= Parapedobacter deserti =

Scientific classification
- Domain: Bacteria
- Kingdom: Pseudomonadati
- Phylum: Bacteroidota
- Class: Sphingobacteriia
- Order: Sphingobacteriales
- Family: Sphingobacteriaceae
- Genus: Parapedobacter
- Species: P. deserti

Binomial name
- Parapedobacter deserti Liu et al. 2017

Type strain
- ACCC 19928, KCTC 52416, N5SSJ16

Genus of bacteria

Parapedobacter deserti is a Gram-negative, non-spore-forming, rod-shaped and non-motile bacterium from the genus of Parapedobacter which has been isolated from the stem of the plant Haloxylon ammodendron.
