= Mucilaginibacter dorajii =

Scientific classification
- Domain: Bacteria
- Kingdom: Pseudomonadati
- Phylum: Bacteroidota
- Class: Sphingobacteriia
- Order: Sphingobacteriales
- Family: Sphingobacteriaceae
- Genus: Mucilaginibacter
- Species: M. dorajii

Binomial name
- Mucilaginibacter dorajii Kim et al. 2011

Type strain
- JCM 16601, KACC 14556, DR-f4

Species of bacterium

Mucilaginibacter dorajii is a Gram-negative, rod-shaped and non-motile bacterium from the genus of Mucilaginibacter which has been isolated from the rhizosphere of the plant Platycodon grandiflorus.
