= Olivibacter domesticus =

Scientific classification
- Domain: Bacteria
- Kingdom: Pseudomonadati
- Phylum: Bacteroidota
- Class: Sphingobacteriia
- Order: Sphingobacteriales
- Family: Sphingobacteriaceae
- Genus: Olivibacter
- Species: O. domesticus

Binomial name
- Olivibacter domesticus (Vaz-Moreira et al. 2007) Siddiqi et al. 2018

Type strain
- CCUG 54353, DSM 18733, LMG 23837, strain DC-186

Synonyms
- Pseudosphingobacterium domesticum, Pseudosphingobacterium domesticus

Species of bacterium

Olivibacter domesticus is a species of gram-negative bacterium from the genus of Olivibacter which has been isolated from compost from Porto in Portugal.
