= Pedobacter agri =

Scientific classification
- Domain: Bacteria
- Kingdom: Pseudomonadati
- Phylum: Bacteroidota
- Class: Sphingobacteriia
- Order: Sphingobacteriales
- Family: Sphingobacteriaceae
- Genus: Pedobacter
- Species: P. agri

Binomial name
- Pedobacter agri Roh et al. 2008

Species of bacterium

Pedobacter agri is a species of Gram-negative bacteria. Its genome has been sequenced. Its type strain is PB92(T) (=KCTC 12511(T) =DSM 19486(T)).
