= Parapedobacter koreensis =

Scientific classification
- Domain: Bacteria
- Kingdom: Pseudomonadati
- Phylum: Bacteroidota
- Class: Sphingobacteriia
- Order: Sphingobacteriales
- Family: Sphingobacteriaceae
- Genus: Parapedobacter
- Species: P. koreensis

Binomial name
- Parapedobacter koreensis Kim et al. 2007

Type strain
- Jip14, KCTC 12643, LMG 23493

Species of bacterium

Parapedobacter koreensis is a Gram-negative, non-spore-forming, rod-shaped and non-motile bacterium from the genus of Parapedobacter which has been isolated from dried rice straw.
