= Olivibacter terrae =

Scientific classification
- Domain: Bacteria
- Kingdom: Pseudomonadati
- Phylum: Bacteroidota
- Class: Sphingobacteriia
- Order: Sphingobacteriales
- Family: Sphingobacteriaceae
- Genus: Olivibacter
- Species: O. terrae

Binomial name
- Olivibacter terrae Wang et al. 2008

Type strain
- Jip13, KCTC 12644, LMG 23494

Synonyms
- Pocheonia terrae

Species of bacterium

Olivibacter terrae is a Gram-negative, aerobic, heterotrophic, rod-shaped, non-spore-forming and non-motile bacterium from the genus of Olivibacter which has been isolated from Korea.
