= Sphingobacterium mucilaginosum =

Scientific classification
- Domain: Bacteria
- Kingdom: Pseudomonadati
- Phylum: Bacteroidota
- Class: Sphingobacteriia
- Order: Sphingobacteriales
- Family: Sphingobacteriaceae
- Genus: Sphingobacterium
- Species: S. mucilaginosum

Binomial name
- Sphingobacterium mucilaginosum Du et al. 2015

Type strain
- CCTCC AB 2014317, KCTC 42503, THG-SQA8

Species of bacterium

Sphingobacterium mucilaginosum is a Gram-negative, strictly aerobic, short rod-shaped and motile bacterium from the genus Sphingobacterium which has been isolated from rhizosphere soil from a rose in China.
