= Mucilaginibacter vulcanisilvae =

Scientific classification
- Domain: Bacteria
- Kingdom: Pseudomonadati
- Phylum: Bacteroidota
- Class: Sphingobacteriia
- Order: Sphingobacteriales
- Family: Sphingobacteriaceae
- Genus: Mucilaginibacter
- Species: M. vulcanisilvae

Binomial name
- Mucilaginibacter vulcanisilvae Baek and Ok Jeon 2015

Type strain
- JCM 30363, KACC 18231, G27

Species of bacterium

Mucilaginibacter vulcanisilvae is an exopolysaccharide-producing and non-motile bacterium from the genus of Mucilaginibacter which has been isolated from the volcanic forest of the Jeju Island in Korea.
