= Sphingobacterium paludis =

Scientific classification
- Domain: Bacteria
- Kingdom: Pseudomonadati
- Phylum: Bacteroidota
- Class: Sphingobacteriia
- Order: Sphingobacteriales
- Family: Sphingobacteriaceae
- Genus: Sphingobacterium
- Species: S. paludis

Binomial name
- Sphingobacterium paludis Feng et al. 2014

Type strain
- CGMCC 1.12801, NBRC 110386, S37

Species of bacterium

Sphingobacterium paludis is a Gram-negative bacterium from the genus Sphingobacterium which has been isolated from soil from the Xixi wetland in China.
