= Sphingobacterium cibi =

Scientific classification
- Domain: Bacteria
- Kingdom: Pseudomonadati
- Phylum: Bacteroidota
- Class: Sphingobacteriia
- Order: Sphingobacteriales
- Family: Sphingobacteriaceae
- Genus: Sphingobacterium
- Species: S. cibi

Binomial name
- Sphingobacterium cibi Lai et al. 2016

Species of bacterium

Sphingobacterium cibie is a Gram-negative, aerobic, rod-shaped and non-motile bacterium from the genus Sphingobacterium which has been isolated from food-waste compost.
