= Mucilaginibacter =

Scientific classification
- Domain: Bacteria
- Kingdom: Pseudomonadati
- Phylum: Bacteroidota
- Class: Sphingobacteriia
- Order: Sphingobacteriales
- Family: Sphingobacteriaceae
- Genus: Mucilaginibacter; Pankratov et al. 2007

Type species
- Mucilaginibacter paludis

Species
- See text.

Genus of bacteria

Mucilaginibacter is a genus of gram-negative bacteria from the family of Sphingobacteriaceae.

== Species ==
The genus Mucilaginibacter comprises the following species:

M. amnicola
M. angelicae
M. antarcticus
M. aquaedulcis
M. auburnensis
M. boryungensis
M. calamicampi
M. carri
M. composti
M. craterilacus
M. daejeonensis
M. defluvii
M. dorajii
M. flavus
M. frigoritolerans
M. galii
M. ginsengisoli
M. ginsenosidivorax
M. gossypii
M. gossypiicola
M. gotjawali
M. gracilis
M. gynuensis
M. herbaticus
M. jinjuensis
M. kameinonensis
M. koreensis
M. lappiensis
M. litoreus
M. lutimaris
M. mallensis
M. myungsuensis
M. oryzae
M. paludis
M. panaciglaebae
M. pineti
M. polysacchareus
M. polytrichastri
M. psychrotolerans
M. rigui
M. rubeus
M. roseus
M. sabulilitoris
M. soli
M. soyangensis
M. vulcanisilvae
M. ximonensis
M. yixingensis
