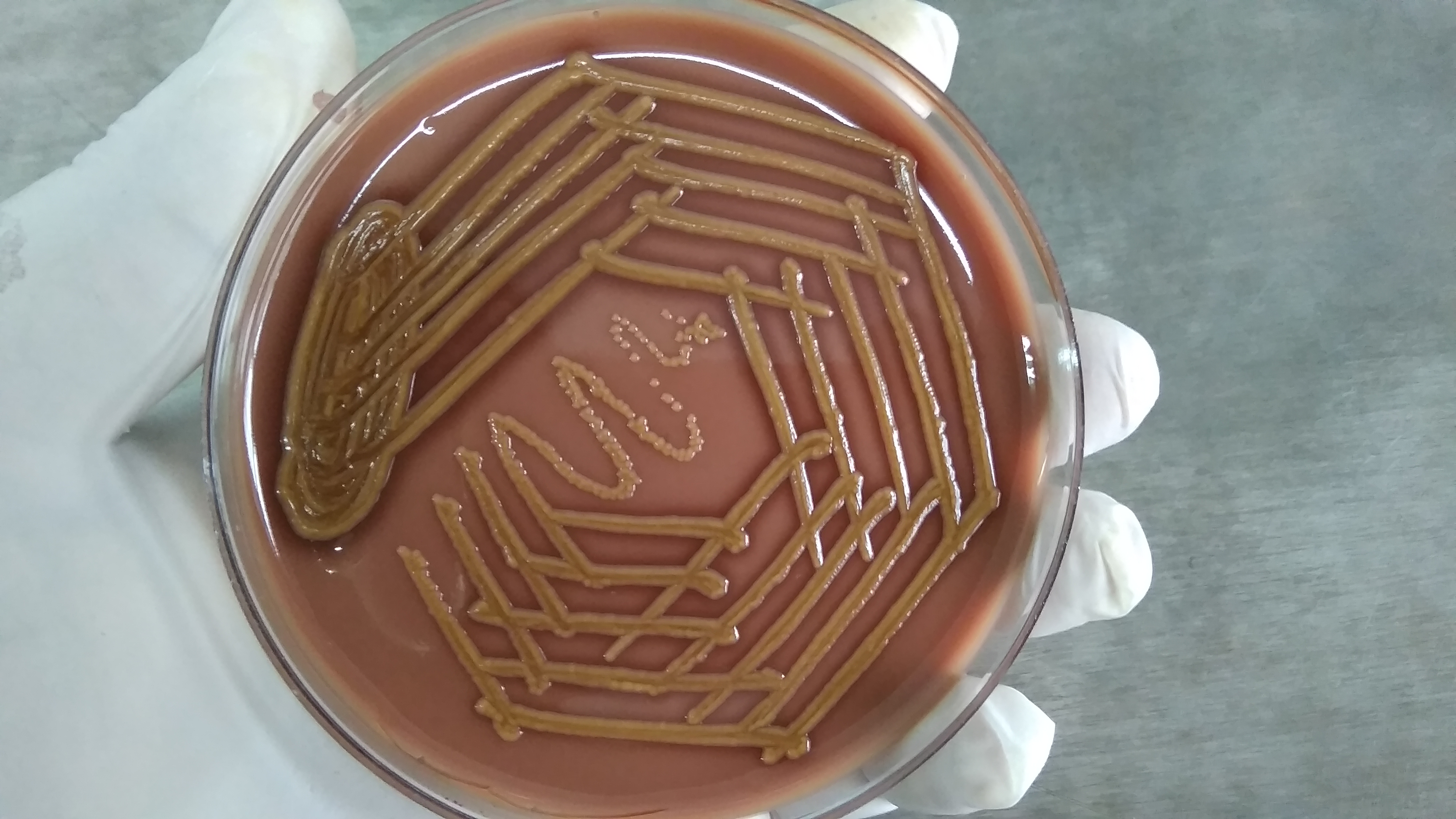
- Sphingobacterium mizutii colony characteristics on Chocolate agar

Scientific classification
- Domain: Bacteria
- Kingdom: Pseudomonadati
- Phylum: Bacteroidota
- Class: Sphingobacteriia
- Order: Sphingobacteriales
- Family: Sphingobacteriaceae
- Genus: Sphingobacterium; Yabuuchi et al. 1983

Species
- See text

= Sphingobacterium =

Genus of bacteria

Sphingobacterium is a genus in the family Sphingobacteriaceae. The genus Sphingobacterium is characterized by the high concentrations of sphingophospholipids as lipid components.

== Species ==
S. alimentarium
S. anhuiense
S. arenae
S. bambusae
S. caeni
S. canadense
S. changzhouense
S. chuzhouense
S. cibi
S. cladoniae
S. composti
S. daejeonense
S. detergens
S. faecium
S. ginsenosidimutans
S. gobiense
S. griseoflavum
S. hotanense
S. jejuense
S. kitahiroshimense
S. kyonggiense
S. lactis
S. mizutaii
S. mucilaginosum
S. multivorum
S. nematocida
S. olei
S. pakistanense
S. paludis
S. populi
S. psychroaquaticum
S. shayense
S. siyangense
S. spiritivorum
S. suaedae
S. thalpophilum
S. thermophilum
S. wenxiniae
S. yanglingense
S. zeae
