= Anseongella =

Scientific classification
- Domain: Bacteria
- Kingdom: Pseudomonadati
- Phylum: Bacteroidota
- Class: Sphingobacteriia
- Order: Sphingobacteriales
- Family: Sphingobacteriaceae
- Genus: Anseongella; Siddiqi et al. 2016

Species
- A. ginsenosidimutans

Genus of bacteria

Anseongella is a genus of gram-negative bacteria from the family of Sphingobacteriaceae, with one known species (Anseongella ginsenosidimutans).
