= Pelobium =

Scientific classification
- Domain: Bacteria
- Kingdom: Pseudomonadati
- Phylum: Bacteroidota
- Class: Sphingobacteriia
- Order: Sphingobacteriales
- Family: Sphingobacteriaceae
- Genus: Pelobium; Xia et al. 2016

Species
- P. manganitolerans

Genus of bacteria

Pelobium is a genus from the family of Sphingobacteriaceae, with one known species (Pelobium manganitolerans).
