= Nubsella =

Scientific classification
- Domain: Bacteria
- Kingdom: Pseudomonadati
- Phylum: Bacteroidota
- Class: Sphingobacteriia
- Order: Sphingobacteriales
- Family: Sphingobacteriaceae
- Genus: Nubsella; Asker et al. 2008

Species
- N. zeaxanthinifaciens

Genus of bacteria

Nubsella is a genus of gram-negative bacteria from the family of Sphingobacteriaceae with one known species (Nubsella zeaxanthinifaciens).
