= Arcticibacter =

Scientific classification
- Domain: Bacteria
- Kingdom: Pseudomonadati
- Phylum: Bacteroidota
- Class: Sphingobacteriia
- Order: Sphingobacteriales
- Family: Sphingobacteriaceae
- Genus: Arcticibacter; Prasad et al. 2013

Type species
- Arcticibacter svalbardensis

Species
- Arcticibacter eurypsychrophilus Arcticibacter pallidicorallinus Arcticibacter svalbardensis

Genus of bacteria

Arcticibacter is a genus of gram-negative bacteria from the family Sphingobacteriaceae.
