= Solitalea =

Scientific classification
- Domain: Bacteria
- Kingdom: Pseudomonadati
- Phylum: Bacteroidota
- Class: Sphingobacteriia
- Order: Sphingobacteriales
- Family: Sphingobacteriaceae
- Genus: Solitalea; Weon et al. 2009

Type species
- Solitalea koreensis

Species
- S. canadensis S. koreensis

Genus of bacteria

Solitalea is a genus from the family of Sphingobacteriaceae.
