= Olivibacter =

Scientific classification
- Domain: Bacteria
- Kingdom: Pseudomonadati
- Phylum: Bacteroidota
- Class: Sphingobacteriia
- Order: Sphingobacteriales
- Family: Sphingobacteriaceae
- Genus: Olivibacter; Ntougias et al. 2007

Type species
- Olivibacter sitiensis

Species
- O. composti O. domesticus O. ginsengisoli O. ginsenosidimutans O. jilunii O. oleidegradans O. sitiensis O. soli O. terrae

Synonyms
- Pseudosphingobacterium Vaz-Moreira et al. 2007

Genus of bacteria

Olivibacter is a genus of gram-negative from the family of Sphingobacteriaceae.
