= Pseudopedobacter =

Scientific classification
- Domain: Bacteria
- Kingdom: Pseudomonadati
- Phylum: Bacteroidota
- Class: Sphingobacteriia
- Order: Sphingobacteriales
- Family: Sphingobacteriaceae
- Genus: Pseudopedobacter; Cao et al. 2014

Type species
- Pseudopedobacter beijingensis

Species
- P. beijingensis P. saltans

Genus of bacteria

Pseudopedobacter is a genus from the family of Sphingobacteriaceae.
