= Pedobacter =

Scientific classification
- Domain: Bacteria
- Kingdom: Pseudomonadati
- Phylum: Bacteroidota
- Class: Sphingobacteriia
- Order: Sphingobacteriales
- Family: Sphingobacteriaceae
- Genus: Pedobacter; Steyn et al. 1998

Species
- See text

Genus of bacteria

Pedobacter is a genus of Gram-negative soil-associated bacteria. Species including Pedobacter heparinus, formerly known as Flavobacterium heparinum, produce heparinase and are capable of using heparin as their sole carbon and nitrogen source.

In molecular biology, Pedobacter has also been identified as a contaminant of DNA extraction kit reagents and ultra-pure water systems, which may lead to its erroneous appearance in microbiota or metagenomic datasets.

== Species ==
- Pedobacter africanus
- Pedobacter agri
- Pedobacter alluvionis
- Pedobacter arcticus
- Pedobacter borealis
- Pedobacter cryoconitis
- Pedobacter ginsengisoli
- Pedobacter heparinus
- Pedobacter insulae
- Pedobacter jejuensis
- Pedobacter lentus
- Pedobacter lusitanus
- Pedobacter nyackensis
- Pedobacter rhizosphaerae
- Pedobacter soli
- Pedobacter terricola
