= Parapedobacter =

Scientific classification
- Domain: Bacteria
- Kingdom: Pseudomonadati
- Phylum: Bacteroidota
- Class: Sphingobacteriia
- Order: Sphingobacteriales
- Family: Sphingobacteriaceae
- Genus: Parapedobacter; Kim et al. 2007

Type species
- Parapedobacter koreensis

Species
- P. composti P. defluvii P. deserti P. indicus P. koreensis P. luteus P. lycopersici P. pyrenivorans P. soli

Genus of bacteria

Parapedobacter is a genus of gram-negative bacteria from the family of Sphingobacteriaceae.
