= Sphingobacterium lactis =

Scientific classification
- Domain: Bacteria
- Kingdom: Pseudomonadati
- Phylum: Bacteroidota
- Class: Sphingobacteriia
- Order: Sphingobacteriales
- Family: Sphingobacteriaceae
- Genus: Sphingobacterium
- Species: S. lactis

Binomial name
- Sphingobacterium lactis Schmidt et al. 2012

Type strain
- DSM 22361, LMG 25272, WCC 4521

Synonyms
- Sphingobacterium lacticum

Species of bacterium

Sphingobacterium lactis is a Gram-negative and rod-shaped bacterium from the genus Sphingobacterium which has been isolated from raw milk in Bavaria in Germany.
