= Filobacterium =

Scientific classification
- Domain: Bacteria
- Kingdom: Pseudomonadati
- Phylum: Bacteroidota
- Class: Sphingobacteriia
- Order: Sphingobacteriales
- Family: Filobacteriaceae; Ike et al. 2016
- Genus: Filobacterium; Ike et al. 2016
- Species: F. rodentium

Binomial name
- Filobacterium rodentium Ike et al. 2016

Type strain
- DSM 100392; JCM 19453; SMR-C

Species of bacteria

Filobacterium rodentium is a species of bacteria, the only species in the genus Filobacterium and the family Filobacteriaceae. It was first isolated from the respiratory tract of a diseased rodent.
