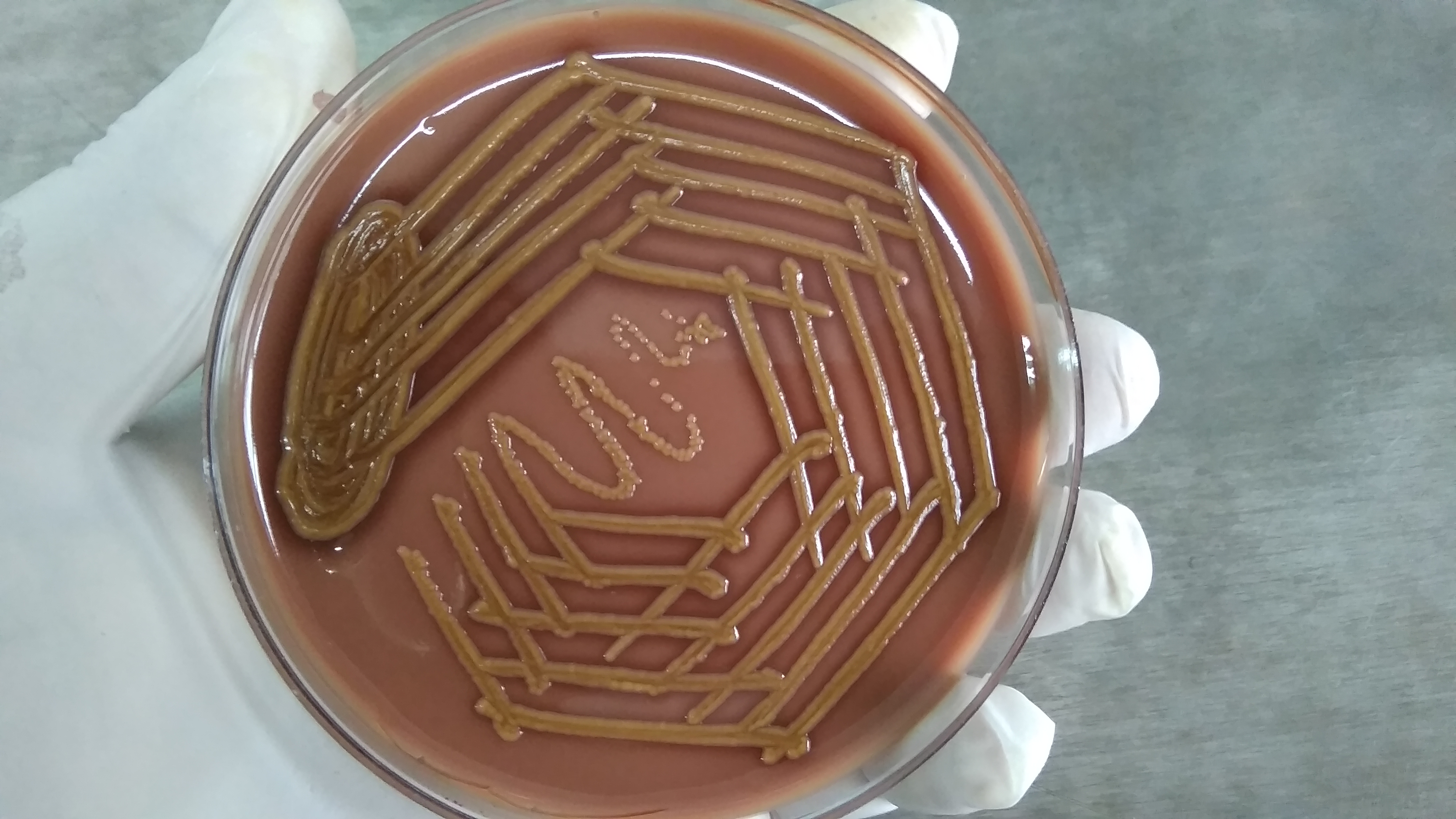
- Sphingobacterium mizutii colony

Scientific classification
- Domain: Bacteria
- Kingdom: Pseudomonadati
- Phylum: Bacteroidota
- Class: Sphingobacteriia
- Order: Sphingobacteriales
- Family: Sphingobacteriaceae; Steyn et al. 1998

Genera
- Albibacterium García-López et al. 2020; Anseongella Siddiqi et al. 2016; Arcticibacter Prasad et al. 2013; Daejeonella García-López et al. 2020; Desertivirga Li et al. 2024; Mucilaginibacter Pankratov et al. 2007; Nubsella Asker et al. 2008; Olivibacter Ntougias et al. 2007; Parapedobacter Kim et al. 2007; Pararcticibacter Cai et al. 2020; Pedobacter Steyn et al. 1998; Pelobium Xia et al. 2016; Pseudopedobacter Cao et al. 2014; Rhinopithecimicrobium Wang et al. 2024; Rubrilithobacter Lian et al. 2025; Solitalea Weon et al. 2009; Sphingobacterium Yabuuchi et al. 1983

= Sphingobacteriaceae =

Family of bacteria

Sphingobacteriaceae is a family of gram-negative, environmental bacteria.

== Phylogeny ==
The currently accepted taxonomy is based on the List of Prokaryotic names with Standing in Nomenclature and the phylogeny is based on whole-genome sequences. (Note: Anseongella, Nubsella, Pararcticibacter, and Pelobium are not included in this phylogenetic tree.)

- - Sphingobacteriaceae
    - Solitalea
    - - - - Albibacterium
          - - Olivibacter
            - Pseudosphingobacterium
        - - Parapedobacter
          - Sphingobacterium
      - - Pedobacter
        - - Pseudopedobacter
          - - Mucilaginibacter
            - - Daejeonella
              - Arcticibacter
  - outgroup
    Chitinophagia
