= Sphingobacteriales =

Scientific classification
- Domain: Bacteria
- Kingdom: Pseudomonadati
- Phylum: Bacteroidota
- Class: Sphingobacteriia
- Order: Sphingobacteriales; Kämpfer 2012

Families
- Aurantibacillaceae Vieira et al. 2023; Filobacteriaceae Ike et al. 2016; Sphingobacteriaceae Steyn et al. 1998

Order of bacteria

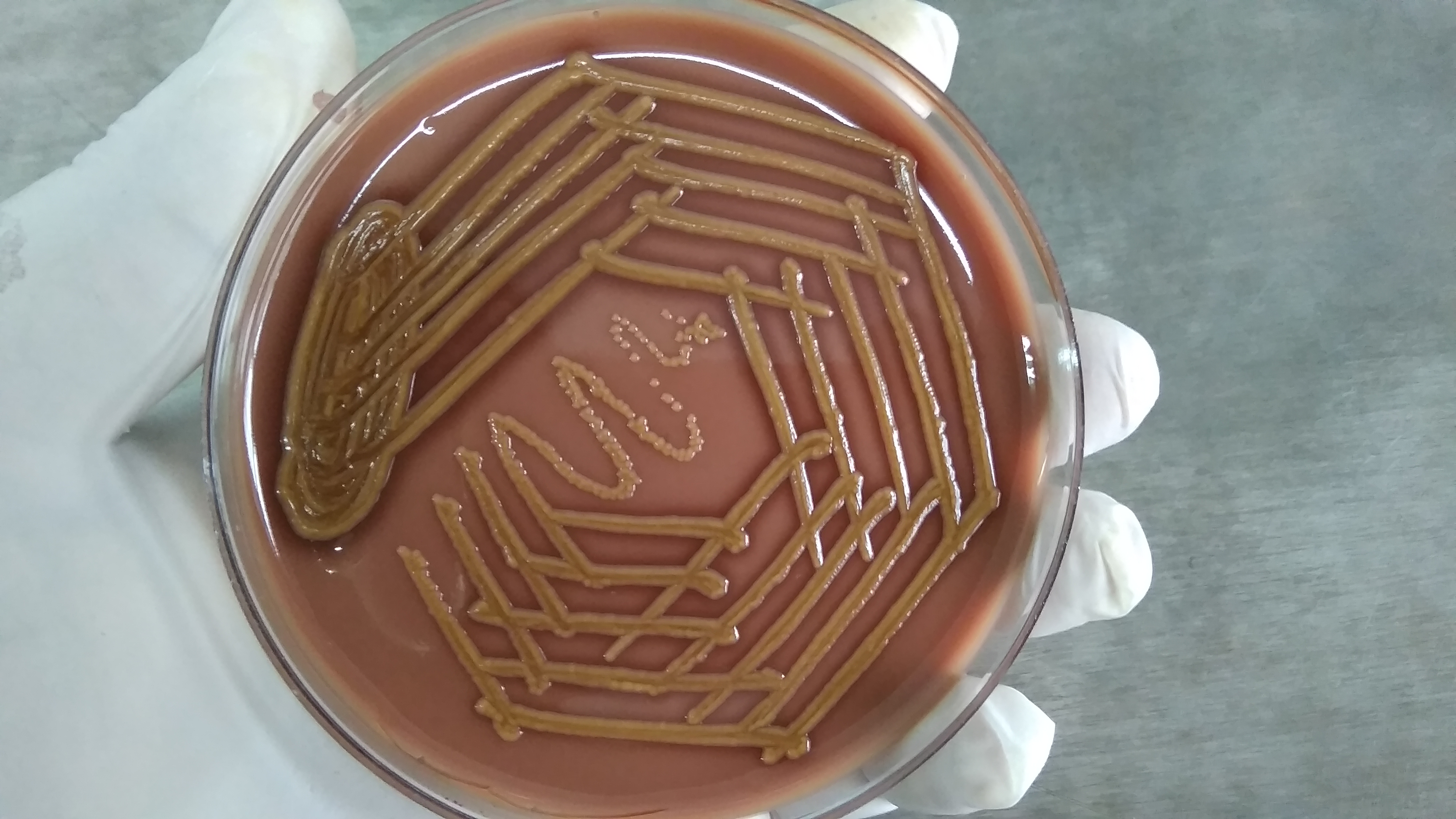
Sphingobacterium mizutii colony characteristics on Chocolate agar

The Sphingobacteriales is an order of environmental, gram-negative bacteria.

== See also ==
- List of bacteria genera
- List of bacterial orders
