= Sphingobacteriia =

Scientific classification
- Domain: Bacteria
- Kingdom: Pseudomonadati
- Phylum: Bacteroidota
- Class: Sphingobacteriia; Kämpfer 2011

Orders
- Sphingobacteriales Kämpfer 2012

Class of bacteria

Sphingobacteriia is a taxonomic class composed of a single order of environmental bacteria that are capable of producing sphingolipids. The earlier name Sphingibacteria was changed in 2011.
