= Paraconexibacter algicola =

Scientific classification
- Domain: Bacteria
- Kingdom: Bacillati
- Phylum: Actinomycetota
- Class: Thermoleophilia
- Order: Solirubrobacterales
- Family: Solirubrobacteraceae
- Genus: Paraconexibacter
- Species: P. algicola

Binomial name
- Paraconexibacter algicola Chun et al. 2020

Type strain
- JCM 31881; KCTC 39791; Seoho-28

Species of bacterium

Paraconexibacter algicola is a species of bacterium in the phylum Actinomycetota.
