= Solirubrobacter soli =

Scientific classification
- Domain: Bacteria
- Kingdom: Bacillati
- Phylum: Actinomycetota
- Class: Thermoleophilia
- Order: Solirubrobacterales
- Family: Solirubrobacteraceae
- Genus: Solirubrobacter
- Species: S. soli

Binomial name
- Solirubrobacter soli Kim et al. 2007

Type strain
- Gsoil 355, JCM 14923, KCTC 12628, LMG 23485, DSM 22325

Species of bacterium

Solirubrobacter soli is a Gram-positive, non-spore-forming, rod-shaped and non-motile bacterium from the genus Solirubrobacter which has been isolated from soil from a ginseng field in Korea.
