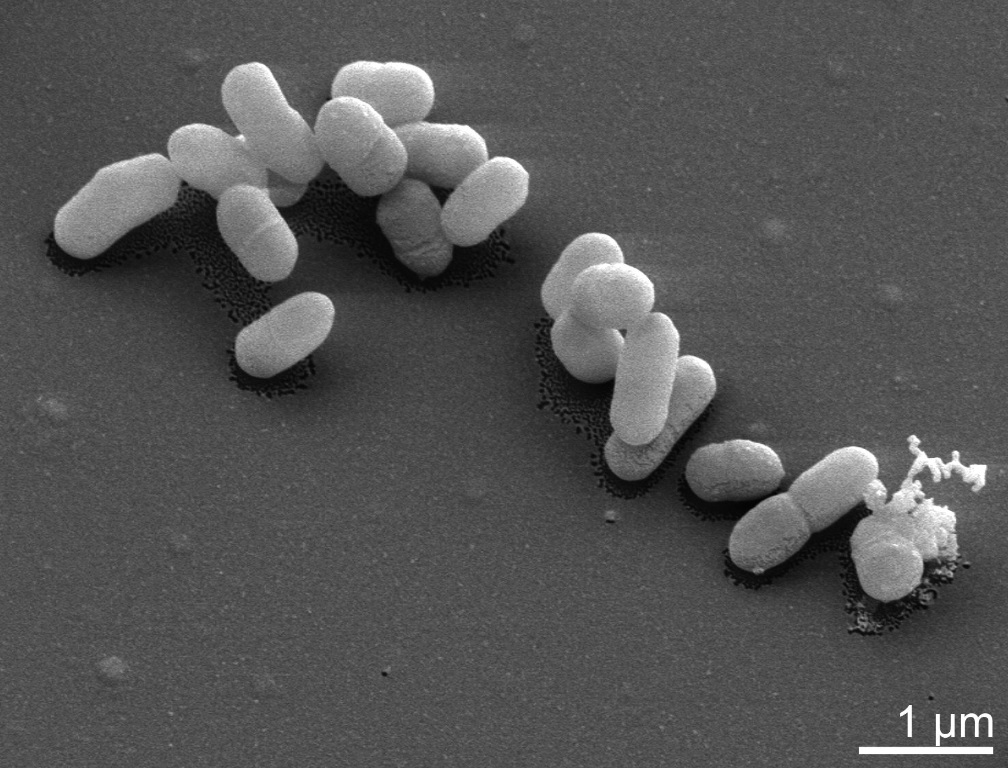

Scientific classification
- Domain: Bacteria
- Kingdom: Bacillati
- Phylum: Actinomycetota
- Class: Thermoleophilia
- Order: Solirubrobacterales
- Family: Conexibacteraceae
- Genus: Conexibacter
- Species: C. woesei

Binomial name
- Conexibacter woesei Monciardini et al. 2003

Type strain
- CCUG 47730, CIP 108061, DSM 14684, ID131577, JCM 11494, KCTC 9949, NBRC 100937

= Conexibacter woesei =

Species of bacterium

Conexibacter woesei is a Gram-positive and mesophilic bacterium from the genus Conexibacter which has been isolated from forest soil in Italy.
