= Conexibacter arvalis =

Scientific classification
- Domain: Bacteria
- Kingdom: Bacillati
- Phylum: Actinomycetota
- Class: Thermoleophilia
- Order: Solirubrobacterales
- Family: Conexibacteraceae
- Genus: Conexibacter
- Species: C. arvalis

Binomial name
- Conexibacter arvalis Seki et al. 2012

Type strain
- DSM 23288, KV-962, NBRC 106558

Species of bacterium

Conexibacter arvalis is a Gram-positive, non-spore-forming, short rod-shaped and motile bacterium from the genus Conexibacter which has been isolated from soil from Saitama prefecture in Japan.
