= Solirubrobacter pauli =

Scientific classification
- Domain: Bacteria
- Kingdom: Bacillati
- Phylum: Actinomycetota
- Class: Thermoleophilia
- Order: Solirubrobacterales
- Family: Solirubrobacteraceae
- Genus: Solirubrobacter
- Species: S. pauli

Binomial name
- Solirubrobacter pauli Singleton et al. 2003

Type strain
- ATCC BAA-492, B33D1, CIP 108104, DSM 14954, JCM 13025, KCTC 9974

Species of bacterium

Solirubrobacter pauli is a mesophilic Gram-positive and aerobic bacterium from the genus Solirubrobacter which has been isolated from the earthworm Lumbricus rubellus from Athens, Georgia in the United States.
