= Solirubrobacter phytolaccae =

Scientific classification
- Domain: Bacteria
- Kingdom: Bacillati
- Phylum: Actinomycetota
- Class: Thermoleophilia
- Order: Solirubrobacterales
- Family: Solirubrobacteraceae
- Genus: Solirubrobacter
- Species: S. phytolaccae

Binomial name
- Solirubrobacter phytolaccae Wei et al. 2014

Type strain
- CCTCC AB 2013011, KCTC 29190, GTGR-8

Species of bacterium

Solirubrobacter phytolaccae is a Gram-positive, strictly aerobic, rod-shaped, non-spore-forming and non-motile bacterium from the genus Solirubrobacter which has been isolated from the roots of the plant Phytolacca acinosa from the Mount Taibai in China.
