= Ilumatobacter coccineus =

Scientific classification
- Domain: Bacteria
- Kingdom: Bacillati
- Phylum: Actinomycetota
- Class: Acidimicrobiia
- Order: Acidimicrobiales
- Family: Ilumatobacteraceae
- Genus: Ilumatobacter
- Species: I. coccineus

Binomial name
- Ilumatobacter coccineus corrig. Matsumoto et al. 2013

Type strain
- KCTC 29153; NBRC 103263; YM16-304

Synonyms
- Ilumatobacter coccineum Matsumoto et al. 2013

Species of bacterium

Ilumatobacter coccineus is a Gram-positive, aerobic and non-motile bacterium from the genus Ilumatobacter which has been isolated from sand from the beach of Shimane Prefecture in Japan.
