= Patulibacter ginsengiterrae =

Scientific classification
- Domain: Bacteria
- Kingdom: Bacillati
- Phylum: Actinomycetota
- Class: Thermoleophilia
- Order: Solirubrobacterales
- Family: Patulibacteraceae
- Genus: Patulibacter
- Species: P. ginsengiterrae

Binomial name
- Patulibacter ginsengiterrae Kim et al. 2012

Type strain
- CECT 7603, DSMZ 25990, KCTC 19427, P4-5

Species of bacterium

Patulibacter ginsengiterrae is a Gram-positive bacterium from the genus Patulibacter which has been isolated from soil from a ginseng field in Geumsan County in Korea.
