= Parviterribacter kavangonensis =

Scientific classification
- Domain: Bacteria
- Kingdom: Bacillati
- Phylum: Actinomycetota
- Class: Thermoleophilia
- Order: Solirubrobacterales
- Family: Parviterribacteraceae
- Genus: Parviterribacter
- Species: P. kavangonensis

Binomial name
- Parviterribacter kavangonensis Foesel et al. 2016

Type strain
- DSM 25205, LMG 26950, D16/0/H6

Species of bacterium

Parviterribacter kavangonensis is a Gram-positive, non-spore-forming bacterium from the genus Parviterribacter which has been isolated from savannah soil in Kavango in Namibia.
