= Ilumatobacter nonamiensis =

Scientific classification
- Domain: Bacteria
- Kingdom: Bacillati
- Phylum: Actinomycetota
- Class: Acidimicrobiia
- Order: Acidimicrobiales
- Family: Ilumatobacteraceae
- Genus: Ilumatobacter
- Species: I. nonamiensis

Binomial name
- Ilumatobacter nonamiensis corrig. Matsumoto et al. 2013

Type strain
- KCTC 29139; NBRC 109120; YM16-303

Synonyms
- Ilumatobacter nonamiense Matsumoto et al. 2013

Species of bacterium

Ilumatobacter nonamiensis is a Gram-positive, aerobic, and non-motile bacterium from the genus Ilumatobacter.
