= Conexibacter stalactiti =

Scientific classification
- Domain: Bacteria
- Kingdom: Bacillati
- Phylum: Actinomycetota
- Class: Thermoleophilia
- Order: Solirubrobacterales
- Family: Conexibacteraceae
- Genus: Conexibacter
- Species: C. stalactiti

Binomial name
- Conexibacter stalactiti Lee 2017

Type strain
- YC2-25, DSM 103719, KCTC 39840

Species of bacterium

Conexibacter stalactiti is a Gram-positive, strictly aerobic, non-spore-forming, rod-shaped and motile bacterium from the genus Conexibacter which has been isolated from stalactites from a lava cave in Jeju in Korea.
