= Solirubrobacter taibaiensis =

Scientific classification
- Domain: Bacteria
- Kingdom: Bacillati
- Phylum: Actinomycetota
- Class: Thermoleophilia
- Order: Solirubrobacterales
- Family: Solirubrobacteraceae
- Genus: Solirubrobacter
- Species: S. taibaiensis

Binomial name
- Solirubrobacter taibaiensis Zhang et al. 2014

Type strain
- CCTCC AB 2013308, KCTC 29222, GTJR-20

Species of bacterium

Solirubrobacter taibaiensis is a Gram-positive, strictly aerobic, rod-shaped and non-motile bacterium from the genus Solirubrobacter which has been isolated from the stem of the plant Phytolacca acinosa from the Mount Taibai in China.
