= Solirubrobacter ginsenosidimutans =

Scientific classification
- Domain: Bacteria
- Kingdom: Bacillati
- Phylum: Actinomycetota
- Class: Thermoleophilia
- Order: Solirubrobacterales
- Family: Solirubrobacteraceae
- Genus: Solirubrobacter
- Species: S. ginsenosidimutans

Binomial name
- Solirubrobacter ginsenosidimutans An et al. 2011

Type strain
- BXN5-15, KACC 20671, LMG 24459, DSM 21036

Species of bacterium

Solirubrobacter ginsenosidimutans is a Gram-positive, non-spore-forming, aerobic and non-motile bacterium from the genus Solirubrobacter which has been isolated from soil from a ginseng field from the Baekdu Mountain in China.
