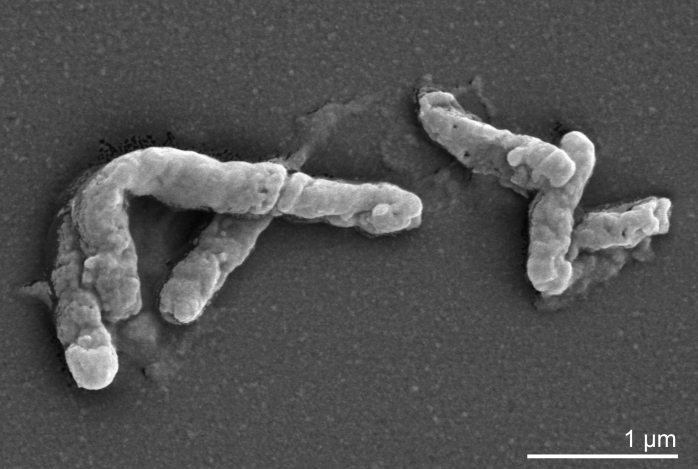
- Acidimicrobium ferrooxidans

Scientific classification
- Domain: Bacteria
- Kingdom: Bacillati
- Phylum: Actinomycetota
- Class: Acidimicrobiia
- Order: Acidimicrobiales
- Family: Acidimicrobiaceae; Stackebrandt et al. 1997

Genera
- Acidiferrimicrobium; Acidimicrobium; Aciditerrimonas; Acidithrix; Ferrimicrobium; Ferrithrix

= Acidimicrobiaceae =

Family of bacteria

Acidimicrobiaceae is a family of bacteria in the phylum Actinomycetota.

== Phylogeny ==
The currently accepted taxonomy is based on the List of Prokaryotic names with Standing in Nomenclature (LPSN) and the National Center for Biotechnology Information (NCBI).

16S rRNA based LTP_10_2024

- Acidimicrobiaceae
  - Acidiferrimicrobium González et al. 2020
  - - Aciditerrimonas Itoh et al. 2011
    - - Acidithrix Jones & Johnson 2022
      - - Ferrithrix Johnson et al. 2009
        - - Acidimicrobium Clark & Norris 1996
          - Ferrimicrobium Johnson et al. 2009

120 marker proteins based GTDB 09-RS220

- - UBA8190
    Aciditerrimonas
  - Acidimicrobiaceae
    - Acidithrix
    - - Ferrithrix
      - - Acidimicrobium
        - Ferrimicrobium
