= Patulibacter brassicae =

Scientific classification
- Domain: Bacteria
- Kingdom: Bacillati
- Phylum: Actinomycetota
- Class: Thermoleophilia
- Order: Solirubrobacterales
- Family: Patulibacteraceae
- Genus: Patulibacter
- Species: P. brassicae

Binomial name
- Patulibacter brassicae Jin et al. 2016

Type strain
- CICC 24108, KCTC 39817, strain SD

Species of bacterium

Patulibacter brassicae is a Gram-positive and aerobic bacterium from the genus Patulibacter which has been isolated from rhizosphere soil from the plant Chinese cabbage in Shandong in China.
