= Ilumatobacter fluminis =

Scientific classification
- Domain: Bacteria
- Kingdom: Bacillati
- Phylum: Actinomycetota
- Class: Acidimicrobiia
- Order: Acidimicrobiales
- Family: Ilumatobacteraceae
- Genus: Ilumatobacter
- Species: I. fluminis

Binomial name
- Ilumatobacter fluminis Matsumoto et al. 2009

Type strain
- DSM 18936; JCM 17811; MBIC08263; YM22-133

Species of bacterium

Ilumatobacter fluminis is a Gram-positive, aerobic, rod-shaped, and non-motile bacterium from the genus Ilumatobacter, which has been isolated from sediments from the mouth of the Kuiragawa River in Japan.
