= Patulibacter medicamentivorans =

Scientific classification
- Domain: Bacteria
- Kingdom: Bacillati
- Phylum: Actinomycetota
- Class: Thermoleophilia
- Order: Solirubrobacterales
- Family: Patulibacteraceae
- Genus: Patulibacter
- Species: P. medicamentivorans

Binomial name
- Patulibacter medicamentivorans Almeida et al. 2013

Type strain
- CECT 8141, DSM 25962, I11

Species of bacterium

Patulibacter medicamentivorans is a Gram-positive, ibuprofen-degrading, non-spore-forming, rod-shaped, aerobic and non-motile bacterium from the genus Patulibacter which has been isolated from activated sludge in Lisbon in Portugal.
