= Patulibacter americanus =

Scientific classification
- Domain: Bacteria
- Kingdom: Bacillati
- Phylum: Actinomycetota
- Class: Thermoleophilia
- Order: Solirubrobacterales
- Family: Patulibacteraceae
- Genus: Patulibacter
- Species: P. americanus

Binomial name
- Patulibacter americanus Reddy and Garcia-Pichel 2009

Type strain
- ATCC BAA-1038, CP177-2, DSM 16676, DSM 16766, JCM 16550

Species of bacterium

Patulibacter americanus is a Gram-positive, psychrotolerant and aerobic bacterium from the genus Patulibacter which has been isolated from biological soil crusts from the Colorado Plateau in the United States.
