= Patulibacter minatonensis =

Scientific classification
- Domain: Bacteria
- Kingdom: Bacillati
- Phylum: Actinomycetota
- Class: Thermoleophilia
- Order: Solirubrobacterales
- Family: Patulibacteraceae
- Genus: Patulibacter
- Species: P. minatonensis

Binomial name
- Patulibacter minatonensis Takahashi et al. 2006

Type strain
- DSM 18081, JCM 12834, NBRC 100761, NRRL B-24346, KV-614

Species of bacterium

Patulibacter minatonensis is a Gram-positive bacterium from the genus Patulibacter which has been isolated from soil in Japan.
