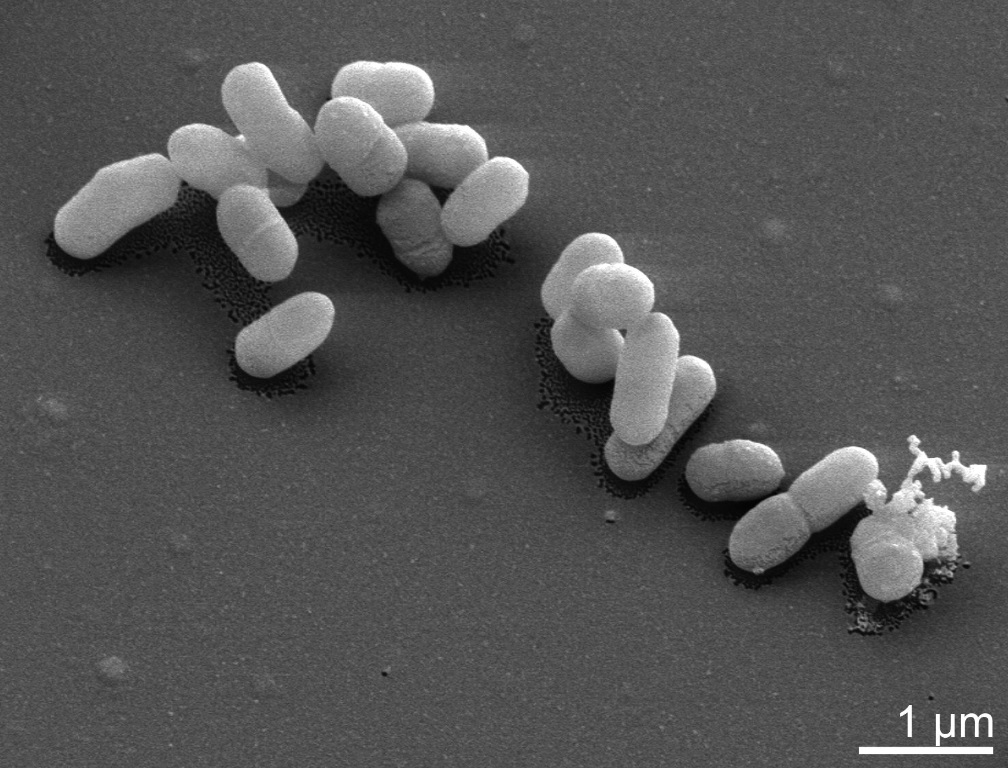
- Conexibacter woesei

Scientific classification
- Domain: Bacteria
- Kingdom: Bacillati
- Phylum: Actinomycetota
- Class: Thermoleophilia
- Order: Solirubrobacterales
- Family: Conexibacteraceae; Stackebrandt 2005
- Genus: Conexibacter; Monciardini et al. 2003

Type species
- Conexibacter woesei Monciardini et al. 2003

Species
- C. arvalis; "Ca. C. pandaia"; C. stalactiti; C. woesei

= Conexibacter =

Genus of bacteria

Conexibacter is a Gram-positive, non-spore-forming and aerobic genus of bacteria from the family Conexibacteraceae.

== Phylogeny ==
The currently accepted taxonomy is based on the List of Prokaryotic names with Standing in Nomenclature (LPSN) and National Center for Biotechnology Information (NCBI).

16S rRNA based LTP_10_2024

- Conexibacter
  - C. stalactiti Lee 2017
  - - C. arvalis Seki et al. 2012
    - C. woesei Monciardini et al. 2003

120 marker proteins based GTDB 10-RS226

- Conexibacter
  - C. arvalis
  - - C. stalactiti
    - C. woesei

== See also ==
- List of bacteria genera
- List of bacterial orders
