= Patulibacter =

Scientific classification
- Domain: Bacteria
- Kingdom: Bacillati
- Phylum: Actinomycetota
- Class: Thermoleophilia
- Order: Solirubrobacterales
- Family: Patulibacteraceae; Takahashi et al. 2006
- Genus: Patulibacter; Takahashi et al. 2006

Type species
- Patulibacter minatonensis Takahashi et al. 2006

Species
- P. americanus; P. brassicae; "P. defluvii"; P. ginsengiterrae; P. medicamentivorans; P. minatonensis

Genus of bacteria

Patulibacter is a genus of bacteria from the family Patulibacteraceae.

== Phylogeny ==
The currently accepted taxonomy is based on the List of Prokaryotic names with Standing in Nomenclature (LPSN) and National Center for Biotechnology Information (NCBI).

16S rRNA based LTP_10_2024

- Patulibacter
  - - P. brassicae Jin et al. 2016
    - P. medicamentivorans Almeida et al. 2013
  - - P. ginsengiterrae Kim et al. 2012
    - - P. americanus Reddy and Garcia-Pichel 2009
      - P. minatonensis Takahashi et al. 2006

120 marker proteins based GTDB 10-RS226

- Patulibacter
  - - P. brassicae
    - P. medicamentivorans
  - - P. americanus
    - P. minatonensis

== See also ==
- List of bacteria genera
- List of bacterial orders
