= Paraconexibacter =

Scientific classification
- Domain: Bacteria
- Kingdom: Bacillati
- Phylum: Actinomycetota
- Class: Thermoleophilia
- Order: Solirubrobacterales
- Family: Paraconexibacteraceae; Chun et al. 2020
- Genus: Paraconexibacter; Chun et al. 2020

Species
- P. algicola Chun et al. 2020; P. antarcticus Kim et al. 2022

Genus of bacteria

Paraconexibacter is a genus of bacteria in the phylum Actinomycetota. It is the only genus in the family Paraconexibacteraceae.
