= Thermoleophilum album =

Scientific classification
- Domain: Bacteria
- Kingdom: Bacillati
- Phylum: Actinomycetota
- Class: Thermoleophilia
- Order: Thermoleophilales
- Family: Thermoleophilaceae
- Genus: Thermoleophilum
- Species: T. album

Binomial name
- Thermoleophilum album Zarilla and Perry 1986

Species of bacterium

Thermoleophilum album is a bacterium obligate for thermophily and n-alkane substrates, the type species of its genus. It is Gram-negative, aerobic, small, and rod-shaped. It lacks pigmentation, motility, and the ability to form endospores, with type strain ATCC 35263.
