= Parviterribacter =

Scientific classification
- Domain: Bacteria
- Kingdom: Bacillati
- Phylum: Actinomycetota
- Class: Thermoleophilia
- Order: Solirubrobacterales
- Family: Parviterribacteraceae; Foesel et al. 2016
- Genus: Parviterribacter; Foesel et al. 2016

Type species
- Parviterribacter kavangonensis Foesel et al. 2015b

Species
- P. kavangonensis; P. multiflagellatus

Genus of bacteria

Parviterribacter is a Gram-positive and non-spore-forming genus of bacteria from the family of Parviterribacteraceae.

== See also ==
- List of bacteria genera
- List of bacterial orders
