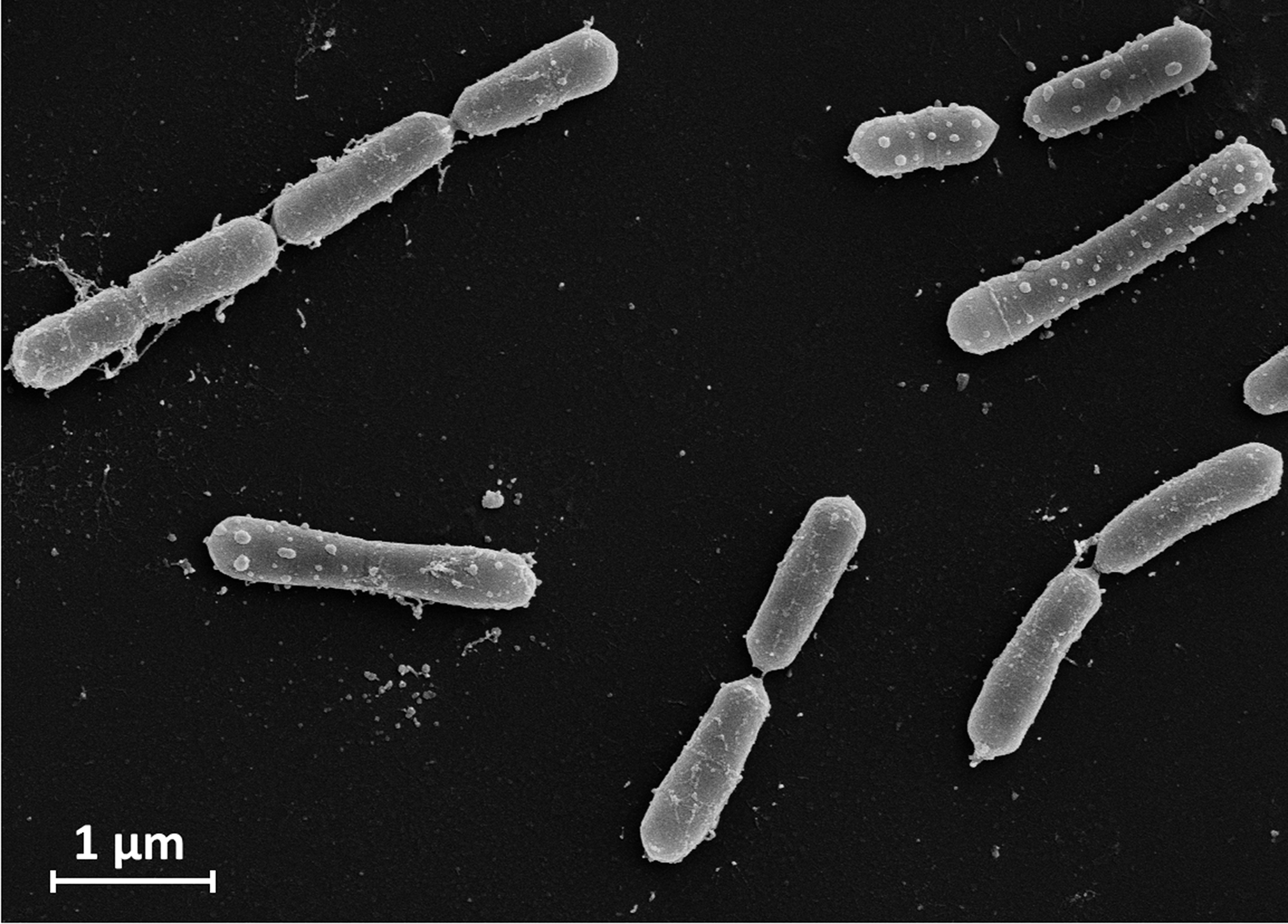
- Baekduia alba

Scientific classification
- Domain: Bacteria
- Kingdom: Bacillati
- Phylum: Actinomycetota
- Class: Thermoleophilia
- Order: Solirubrobacterales
- Family: Baekduiaceae
- Genus: Baekduia
- Species: B. soli

Binomial name
- Baekduia soli An et al. 2019

Type strain
- BR7-21; KCTC 22257; LMG 24797

= Baekduia soli =

Class of bacteria

Baekduia soli is a species of Actinomycetota.
