= Ferrithrix thermotolerans =

Scientific classification
- Domain: Bacteria
- Kingdom: Bacillati
- Phylum: Actinomycetota
- Class: Acidimicrobiia
- Order: Acidimicrobiales
- Family: Acidimicrobiaceae
- Genus: Ferrithrix; Johnson et al. 2009
- Species: F. thermotolerans

Binomial name
- Ferrithrix thermotolerans Johnson et al. 2009

Type strain
- ATCC BAA-1645; DSM 19514; Y005

Species of bacterium

Ferrithrix thermotolerans is a bacterium from the genus Ferrithrix which has been isolated from mineral samples from the Yellowstone National Park in the United States.
