= Ferrimicrobium acidiphilum =

Scientific classification
- Domain: Bacteria
- Kingdom: Bacillati
- Phylum: Actinomycetota
- Class: Acidimicrobiia
- Order: Acidimicrobiales
- Family: Acidimicrobiaceae
- Genus: Ferrimicrobium; Johnson et al. 2009
- Species: F. acidiphilum

Binomial name
- Ferrimicrobium acidiphilum Johnson et al. 2009

Type strain
- ATCC BAA-1647; DSM 19497; T23

Species of bacterium

Ferrimicrobium acidiphilum is an extremely acidophilic and iron-oxidizing bacterium from the genus Ferrimicrobium which has been isolated from mine water from the Cae Coch sulfur mine in North Wales in England.
