= Gaiella =

Scientific classification
- Domain: Bacteria
- Kingdom: Bacillati
- Phylum: Actinomycetota
- Class: Thermoleophilia
- Order: Gaiellales; Albuquerque et al. 2012
- Family: Gaiellaceae; Albuquerque et al. 2012
- Genus: Gaiella; Albuquerque et al. 2012
- Species: G. occulta

Binomial name
- Gaiella occulta Albuquerque et al. 2012

Type strain
- CECT 7815 F2-233; LMG 26412 strain F2-233

Species of bacterium

Gaiella occulta is a rod-shaped and non-motile bacterium from the genus Gaiella which has been isolated from deep mineral water in Portugal. It is gram-negative staining, aerobic and chemoorganotrophic bacteria. G. occulta has an optimal growth temperature of 35 – 37°C and a PH for optimum growth between 6.5 and 7.5.
