= Ilumatobacter =

Scientific classification
- Domain: Bacteria
- Kingdom: Bacillati
- Phylum: Actinomycetota
- Class: Acidimicrobiia
- Order: Acidimicrobiales
- Family: Ilumatobacteraceae
- Genus: Ilumatobacter; Matsumoto et al. 2009

Type species
- Ilumatobacter fluminis Matsumoto et al. 2009

Species
- I. coccineus; I. fluminis; "Ca. I. herschelensis"; "Ca. I. isfjordensis"; I. nonamiensis

Genus of bacteria

Ilumatobacter is a genus from the order Acidimicrobiales.

== Phylogeny ==
The currently accepted taxonomy is based on the List of Prokaryotic names with Standing in Nomenclature (LPSN) and National Center for Biotechnology Information (NCBI).

16S rRNA based LTP_10_2024

- Ilumatobacter
  - I. fluminis
  - - I. coccineus
    - I. nonamiensis

120 marker proteins based GTDB 10-RS226

- Ilumatobacter
  - I. fluminis Matsumoto et al. 2009
  - - I. coccineus corrig. Matsumoto et al. 2013
    - I. nonamiensis corrig. Matsumoto et al. 2013
