= Solirubrobacter =

Scientific classification
- Domain: Bacteria
- Kingdom: Bacillati
- Phylum: Actinomycetota
- Class: Thermoleophilia
- Order: Solirubrobacterales
- Family: Solirubrobacteraceae; Stackebrandt 2005
- Genus: Solirubrobacter; Singleton et al. 2003

Type species
- Solirubrobacter pauli Singleton et al. 2003

Species
- "S. deserti"; S. ginsenosidimutans; S. pauli; S. phytolaccae; "Ca. S. pratensis"; S. soli; S. taibaiensis

Genus of bacteria

Solirubrobacter is a Gram-positive, spore-forming, aerobic, mesophilic and non-motile genus of bacteria from the family Solirubrobacteraceae.

== Phylogeny ==
The currently accepted taxonomy is based on the List of Prokaryotic names with Standing in Nomenclature (LPSN) and National Center for Biotechnology Information (NCBI).

16S rRNA based LTP_10_2024

- Solirubrobacter
  - - S. ginsenosidimutans An et al. 2011
    - S. soli
  - - S. taibaiensis
    - - S. pauli
      - S. phytolaccae

120 marker proteins based GTDB 10-RS226

- Solirubrobacter
  - "Ca. S. pratensis" Jiang et al. 2023
  - - S. soli Kim et al. 2007
    - - "S. deserti" Jiang et al. 2023
      - - S. taibaiensis Zhang et al. 2014
        - - S. pauli Singleton et al. 2003
          - S. phytolaccae Wei et al. 2014
