= C25 =

C25 or C-25 may refer to:

== Vehicles ==
Aircraft

- Boeing VC-25, an American aircraft operated as Air Force One
- Caudron C.25, a French biplane
- Cierva C.25, a British autogyro
- Lockheed C-25 Altair, an American military transport

Automobiles

- BSA C25 Barracuda, a British motorcycle
- Carlsson C25, a German sports car
- Citroën C25, a French van

Ships and boats

- Catalina 25, an American sailboat
- HMS C25, a C-class submarine of the Royal Navy

== Other uses ==
- C-25 highway (Spain), in Catalonia
- C25 road (Namibia)
- Caldwell 25, a globular cluster
- OMX Copenhagen 25, an index on the Copenhagen Stock Exchange
- Pancreatic cancer
- Siemens C25, a mobile phone
- Vienna Game, a chess opening
- Waverly Municipal Airport, in Waverly, Iowa
- Isolate C25 of the bacterium Acidithrix ferrooxidans
- C25 gas, a gaseous mixture of 75% Argon and 25% Carbon Dioxide, commonly used in MIG welding.
- C25, the latest Canadian Service Rifle.
