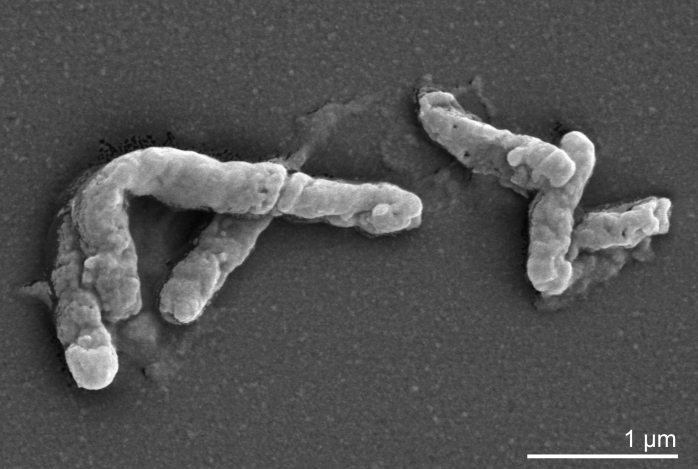

Scientific classification
- Domain: Bacteria
- Kingdom: Bacillati
- Phylum: Actinomycetota
- Class: Acidimicrobiia
- Order: Acidimicrobiales
- Family: Acidimicrobiaceae
- Genus: Acidimicrobium; Clark and Norris 1996
- Species: A. ferrooxidans

Binomial name
- Acidimicrobium ferrooxidans Clark and Norris 1996

= Acidimicrobium ferrooxidans =

Species of bacterium

Acidimicrobium ferrooxidans is a bacterium, the type species of its genus. It is a ferrous-iron-oxidizing, moderately thermophilic and acidophilic bacterium. A complete genome of one strain, DSM 10331 isolated in Iceland from hot spring runoff water, has been resolved.
