= Iamia majanohamensis =

Scientific classification
- Domain: Bacteria
- Kingdom: Bacillati
- Phylum: Actinomycetota
- Class: Acidimicrobiia
- Order: Acidimicrobiales
- Family: Iamiaceae
- Genus: Iamia; Kurahashi et al. 2009
- Species: I. majanohamensis

Binomial name
- Iamia majanohamensis Kurahashi et al. 2009

Type strain
- DSM 19957; F12; NBRC 102561

Species of bacterium

Iamia majanohamensis is a Gram-positive bacterium from the genus of Iamia which has been isolated from the sea cucumber (Holothuria edulis) on the Aka Island in Japan.
