= Iamiaceae =

Scientific classification
- Domain: Bacteria
- Kingdom: Bacillati
- Phylum: Actinomycetota
- Class: Acidimicrobiia
- Order: Acidimicrobiales
- Family: Iamiaceae; Kurahashi et al. 2009

Genera
- Actinomarinicola; Actinospongiicola; Aquihabitans; Iamia; Rhabdothermincola

Family of bacteria

Iamiaceae is a family of bacteria in the phylum Actinomycetota.

== Phylogeny ==
The currently accepted taxonomy is based on the List of Prokaryotic names with Standing in Nomenclature (LPSN) and National Center for Biotechnology Information (NCBI).

16S rRNA based LTP_10_2024

- - Iamiaceae
    - - Aquihabitans
      - Iamia
    - - Actinomarinicola
      - Rhabdothermincola
  - other

120 marker proteins based GTDB 10-RS226

- - - Iamiaceae
      - Aquihabitans Jin et al. 2013
      - Iamia Kurahashi et al. 2009
  - - - "Rhabdothermincolaceae"
        Rhabdothermincola Liu et al. 2021
    - - - "Actinomarinicolaceae"
          Actinomarinicola He et al. 2020
      - other
