= Thermoleophilum =

Scientific classification
- Domain: Bacteria
- Kingdom: Bacillati
- Phylum: Actinomycetota
- Class: Thermoleophilia
- Order: Thermoleophilales
- Family: Thermoleophilaceae
- Genus: Thermoleophilum; Zarilla and Perry 1986

Type species
- Thermoleophilum album Zarilla and Perry 1986

Species
- T. album; T. minutum

Genus of bacteria

Thermoleophilum is a genus of Actinomycetota.

== Phylogeny ==
The currently accepted taxonomy is based on the List of Prokaryotic names with Standing in Nomenclature (LPSN) and National Center for Biotechnology Information (NCBI).

16S rRNA based LTP_10_2024

- Thermoleophilum
  - T. album Zarilla & Perry 1986
  - T. minutum Zarilla & Perry 1986 [incl. Thermomicrobium fosteri Phillips & Perry 1976]

120 marker proteins based GTDB 10-RS226

- Thermoleophilum
  T. album
