= Aciditerrimonas ferrireducens =

Scientific classification
- Domain: Bacteria
- Kingdom: Bacillati
- Phylum: Actinomycetota
- Class: Acidimicrobiia
- Order: Acidimicrobiales
- Family: incertae sedis
- Genus: Aciditerrimonas; Itoh et al. 2011
- Species: A. ferrireducens

Binomial name
- Aciditerrimonas ferrireducens Itoh et al. 2011

Type strain
- DSM 45281; IC-180; JCM 15389

Species of bacterium

Aciditerrimonas ferrireducens is a Gram-positive, iron-reducing, moderately thermophilic, short rod-shaped, acidophilic and motile bacterium from the genus Aciditerrimonas which has been isolated from soil from a solfataric field in Ōwakudani in Japan.
