= Amycolatopsis nalaikhensis =

Scientific classification
- Domain: Bacteria
- Kingdom: Bacillati
- Phylum: Actinomycetota
- Class: Actinomycetes
- Order: Pseudonocardiales
- Family: Pseudonocardiaceae
- Genus: Amycolatopsis
- Species: A. nalaikhensis

Binomial name
- Amycolatopsis nalaikhensis Oyuntsetseg and Kim 2024

Species of actinobacterium

Amycolatopsis nalaikhensis is an actinobacterium from the genus Amycolatopsis that has been isolated from a coal mining site soil in Mongolia (Nalaikh coal mining site, Nalaikh, Mongolia). Amycolatopsis nalaikhensis showed broad antifungal activity against several filamentous fungi and also antibacterial activity against methicillin-resistant Staphylococcus aureus and Acinetobacter baumannii. It was first described by Oyuntsetseg and Kim in 2024.
