= Acidithrix ferrooxidans =

Scientific classification
- Domain: Bacteria
- Kingdom: Bacillati
- Phylum: Actinomycetota
- Class: Acidimicrobiia
- Order: Acidimicrobiales
- Family: incertae sedis
- Genus: "Acidithrix"; Kay et al. 2013
- Species: A. ferrooxidans

Binomial name
- Acidithrix ferrooxidans Kay et al. 2013

Type strain
- DSM 28176; JCM 19728; Py-F3

Species of bacterium

Acidithrix ferrooxidans (A. ferrooxidans) is a heterotrophic, acidophilic and Gram-positive bacterium from the genus Acidithrix. The type strain of this species, A. ferrooxidans Py-F3, was isolated from an acidic stream draining from a copper mine in Wales. This species grows in a variety of acidic environments such as streams, mines or geothermal sites. Mine lakes with a redoxcline support growth with ferrous iron as the electron donor. "A. ferrooxidans" grows rapidly in macroscopic streamer, producing greater cell densities than other streamer-forming microbes. Use in a bioreactors to remediate mine waste has been proposed due to cell densities and rapid oxidation of ferrous iron oxidation in acidic mine drainage. Exopolysaccharide production during metal substrate metabolism, such as iron oxidation helps to prevent cell encrustation by minerals.

== Isolates/Sequencing ==
=== Isolate Py-F3 ===
Type strain Py-F3 was isolated from acidic, metal-rich mine waters in North Wales. Py-3 can grow different metabolisms for potential growth substrates, and can grow at a range of temperatures from 10 to 30 °C and pH from1.5–4.4. Strain Py-F3 encodes multiple enzymes for carbon fixation, including RubisCO, but its carbon fixation activity has not been studied. Genes encoding proteins for metabolic pathways utilizing sulfur, nitrogen, and iron were discovered in the genome. The source of sulfur is sulfate, and it can use amino acids as a nitrogen source. This is unique requirement of isolate Py-F3, leaving it with an inability to grow in media unless complex substrates are added. For pH homeostasis the urease genes could aid survival due to encoded the proton pumping activity. Uptake of urea is documented in Py-F3 and allows for the intracellular production of urea, rather than taking it in to the cell. This organism's peptidoglycan contains meso-diaminopimelic acid and with major fatty acid chains and a respiratory quinone.

=== Isolate C25 ===
Isolate C25 was recovered from particulate iron forming in a pelagic iron-rich redoxcline zone of a mine lake. This isolate can both oxidize Fe(II) and reduce Fe(III) under micro-oxic conditions, and was suggested to contribute to the formation of particulate iron in the pelagic environment. Growth did not occur at pH lower than that of Py-F3 (pH) of 2, while C25 had a higher pH tolerance. The observation that C25 can both oxidize and reduce iron provides insights into how microbes cycle both iron and organic carbon under acidic conditions. Fast rates of iron oxidation lead to the regeneration of ferric iron in the environment at a pH as low as 1.5. Compared to Py-F3, C25 did not encode for the ribulose, but future studies will need to be done for a definitive answer.

== Application to Bioremediation ==
The strains grow using iron metabolism on Tryptic Soy Broth/Agar (TSA/TSB) at low pH, where bacterial colonies form with iron precipitates. Lab conditions of 25 °C aerobically allowed for ferrous iron oxidation to occur in sterilized lake medium. Researchers recognized the potential of utilizing "A. ferrooxidans" for a bioreactor through growth/adherence on solid surfaces. Iron mines make an excellent growing condition and analogy for the bioreactor due to those similar surfaces. Utilizing the bacteria can facilitate soluble iron removal from ferruginous water, and the iron (III) production contributes to sulfide minerals dissolving.
