= Ilumatobacteraceae =

Scientific classification
- Domain: Bacteria
- Kingdom: Bacillati
- Phylum: Actinomycetota
- Class: Acidimicrobiia
- Order: Acidimicrobiales
- Family: Ilumatobacteraceae; Asem et al. 2018

Genera
- Desertimonas; Ilumatobacter

Family of bacteria

The Ilumatobacteraceae are a family bacteria in the phylum Actinomycetota.

== Phylogeny ==
The currently accepted taxonomy is based on the List of Prokaryotic names with Standing in Nomenclature (LPSN) and National Center for Biotechnology Information (NCBI).

16S rRNA based LTP_10_2024

- Ilumatobacteraceae
  - Desertimonas Asem et al. 2018
  - Ilumatobacter Matsumoto et al. 2009

120 marker proteins based GTDB 10-RS226

- Ilumatobacteraceae
  - Desertimonas
  - Ilumatobacter
