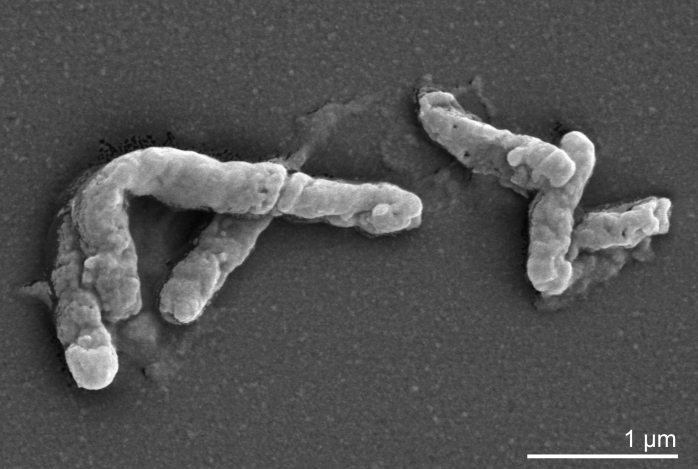
- Acidimicrobium ferrooxidans

Scientific classification
- Domain: Bacteria
- Kingdom: Bacillati
- Phylum: Actinomycetota; Norris 2013
- Class: Acidimicrobiia; Stackebrandt et al. 1997

Families
- Acidimicrobiales; Acidimicrobiaceae; "Actinomarinicolaceae"; "Aldehyrespiratoraceae"; "Hopanoidivoracaceae"; Iamiaceae; Ilumatobacteraceae; "Microtrichaceae"; "Poriferisodalaceae"; "Rhabdothermincolaceae"; "Salinilacustritrichaceae"; "Actinomarinales"; "Actinomarinaceae"; "Spongiisociales"; "Benthobacteraceae"; "Spongiisociaceae"

Synonyms
- Acidimicrobiidae Rainey & Ward-Rainey 1997; "Actinomarinidae" Ghai et al. 2013

= Acidimicrobiia =

Class of bacteria

The Acidimicrobiia are a class of Actinomycetota, in which three families, eight genera, and nine species have been described, Acidimicrobium ferrooxidans is the type species of the order.

== Phylogeny ==
The currently accepted taxonomy is based on the List of Prokaryotic names with Standing in Nomenclature (LPSN) and National Center for Biotechnology Information (NCBI).

MLST based phylogeny of 30 proteins.

- Acidimicrobiales
  - Aciditerrimonas
  - - - Acidimicrobiaceae
        - Acidithrix
        - - Ferrithrix
          - - Ferrimicrobium
            - Acidimicrobium
    - - - Iamiaceae
          - Aquihabitans
          - Iamia
      - - Ilumatobacteraceae
          Ilumatobacter
        - "Microtrichaceae"
          - "Ca. Limnosphaera"
          - "Ca. Neomicrothrix"

16S rRNA based LTP_10_2024

- Acidimicrobiia Acidimicrobiales
  - - Iamiaceae
      - - Aquihabitans
        - Iamia
      - - Actinomarinicola
        - Rhabdothermincola
  - - Ilumatobacteraceae
      - Desertimonas
      - Ilumatobacter
    - Acidimicrobiaceae
      - Acidiferrimicrobium González et al. 2020
      - - Aciditerrimonas
        - - Acidithrix
          - - Ferrithrix
            - - Ferrimicrobium
              - Acidimicrobium

120 marker proteins based GTDB 10-RS226

- Acidimicrobiia
  - - "Actinomarinales"
      - "Actinomarinaceae"
        Ca. "Actinomarina" Ghai et al. 2013
    - "Spongiisociales"
      - "Spongiisociaceae"
        Ca. "Spongiisocius" Nguyen 2022
      - "Benthobacteraceae"
        - Ca. "Benthobacter" Silva-Solar et al. 2024 [JAHEEL01]
        - Ca. "Hadalibacter" Silva-Solar et al. 2024 [B3-G11]
  - - Acidimicrobiales
      - - UBA8190
          Aciditerrimonas Itoh et al. 2011
        - Acidimicrobiaceae
          - Acidithrix Jones & Johnson 2022
          - - Ferrithrix Johnson et al. 2009
            - - Ferrimicrobium Johnson et al. 2009
              - Acidimicrobium Clark & Norris 1996
      - - - Ilumatobacteraceae
            - Desertimonas Asem et al. 2018
            - Ilumatobacter Matsumoto et al. 2009
        - - - Iamiaceae
              - Aquihabitans Jin et al. 2013
              - Iamia Kurahashi et al. 2009
          - - - "Rhabdothermincolaceae"
                Rhabdothermincola Liu et al. 2021
            - - - "Actinomarinicolaceae"
                  Actinomarinicola He et al. 2020
              - - - - "Poriferisodalaceae"
                      "Ca. Poriferisodalis" Nguyen 2022
                  - - - "Aldehyrespiratoraceae"
                        "Ca. Aldehyrespirator" Nguyen 2022
                    - - "Hopanoidivoracaceae"
                        "Ca. Hopanoidivorans" Nguyen 2022
                      - Bin134
                        "Ca. Poriferisocius" Nguyen 2022
                - - "Microtrichaceae"
                    - "Dermatobacter" Jo et al. 2023
                    - "Ca. Neomicrothrix" corrig. Blackall et al. 1996
                      ["Ca. Microthrix" Blackall et al. 1996 non Ragonot 1888]

=== Genera incertae sedis ===
- Acidimicrobiales
  - Acidithiomicrobium Davis-Belmar & Norris 2009
  - Acidimicrobiaceae
    - Acidiferrimicrobium González et al. 2020
  - Iamiaceae
    - Actinospongiicola corrig. Huang et al. 2026
  - "Salinilacustritrichaceae" Gao et al. 2024
    - "Salinilacustrithrix" Gao et al. 2024
  - "Microtrichaceae"
    - "Candidatus Limnosphaera" Kim, Kang & Cho 2017

== See also ==
- List of bacteria genera
- List of bacterial orders
