= Solirubrobacterales =

Scientific classification
- Domain: Bacteria
- Kingdom: Bacillati
- Phylum: Actinomycetota
- Class: Thermoleophilia
- Order: Solirubrobacterales; Reddy and Garcia-Pichel 2009

Families
- Baekduiaceae; Capillimicrobiaceae; Conexibacteraceae; Paraconexibacteraceae; Parviterribacteraceae; Patulibacteraceae; Solirubrobacteraceae

Class of bacteria

Solirubrobacterales isre an order of Actinomycetota.

== Phylogeny ==
The currently accepted taxonomy is based on the List of Prokaryotic names with Standing in Nomenclature (LPSN) and National Center for Biotechnology Information (NCBI).

16S rRNA based LTP_10_2024

- - Thermoleophilales
    - Thermoleophilaceae
      Thermoleophilum
  - Solirubrobacterales
    - - Solirubrobacteraceae
        Solirubrobacter
    - - - Conexibacteraceae
          Conexibacter
      - - - - Capillimicrobiaceae
              Capillimicrobium
          - - Baekduiaceae
              Baekduia
            - Paraconexibacteraceae
              Paraconexibacter
        - - Parviterribacteraceae
            Parviterribacter Foesel et al. 2015b
          - Patulibacteraceae
            Patulibacter

120 marker proteins based GTDB 10-RS226

- Thermoleophilales
  - Thermoleophilaceae
    Thermoleophilum Zarilla & Perry 1986
  - Solirubrobacteraceae
    - Patulibacter Takahashi et al. 2006
    - - Solirubrobacter Singleton et al. 2003
      - - Conexibacter Monciardini et al. 2003
        - - Capillimicrobium Vieira et al. 2022
          - - - "Ca. Siliceabacter" Fishman et al. 2022
              - Svornostia Kapinusova et al. 2024
            - - Baekduia An et al. 2019
              - Paraconexibacter Chun et al. 2020

Genus incertae sedis:

- Bactoderma Winogradsky & Winogradsky 1933 ex Tepper & Korshunova 1973
- "Candidatus Mayfieldus" Sipes et al. 2024

== See also ==
- List of bacterial orders
- List of bacteria genera
