= Thermoleophilia =

Scientific classification
- Domain: Bacteria
- Kingdom: Bacillati
- Phylum: Actinomycetota
- Class: Thermoleophilia; Suzuki and Whitman 2013

Orders
- Gaiellales; Miltoncostaeales; Solirubrobacterales; Thermoleophilales

Synonyms
- "Thermoleophilidae" Suzuki & Whitman 2012

Class of bacteria

The Thermoleophilia are a class of Actinomycetota.

== Phylogeny ==
The currently accepted taxonomy is based on the List of Prokaryotic names with Standing in Nomenclature (LPSN) and National Center for Biotechnology Information (NCBI).

16S rRNA based LTP_10_2024

- Thermoleophilia
  - Miltoncostaeales Li et al. 2021
  - - Gaiellales Albuquerque et al. 2012
    - - Thermoleophilales Reddy & Garcia-Pichel 2009
      - Solirubrobacterales Reddy & Garcia-Pichel 2009

120 marker proteins based GTDB 09-RS220

- Thermoleophilia
  - - Gaiellales
    - Miltoncostaeales
  - Thermoleophilales (incl. Solirubrobacterales)

== See also ==
- List of bacteria genera
- List of bacterial orders
