= MDR-NUDIX RNA motif =

MDR-NUDIX
- Consensus secondary structure and sequence conservation of MDR-NUDIX RNA

Identifiers
- Symbol: MDR-NUDIX
- Rfam: RF02918

Other data
- RNA type: Cis-reg
- SO: SO:0005836
- PDB structures: PDBe

The MDR-NUDIX RNA motif is a conserved RNA structure that was discovered by bioinformatics. The MDR-NUDIX motif is found in the poorly studied phylum TM7.

MDR-NUDIX motif RNAs likely function as cis-regulatory elements, in view of their positions upstream of protein-coding genes. Indeed, the RNAs are upstream of multiple genes that encode non-homologous proteins. If all examples of the RNA were upstream of homologous genes, there is the possibility that the RNAs were conserved in that position simply by inheritance. The non-homology of the genes downstream of MDR-NUDIX RNAs makes this scenario less likely. Most MDR-NUDIX RNAs are located upstream of genes that encode multidrug resistance transporters or the NUDIX protein domain, which is a hydrolase of various nucleoside diphosphate derivatives.
