= WS4 =

WS4 can refer to:

- Waardenburg syndrome type IV
- WS4, a candidate phylum of bacteria
