= RF3 =

RF3 can refer to:

- Red Faction: Guerrilla, the third installment of the Red Faction franchise
- RF3, a candidate phylum of bacteria
