= CPR2 =

CPR2 can refer to:

- Ottawa/Embrun Aerodrome, (TC LID: CPR2)
- CPR2, a candidate phylum of bacteria
