= CPR3 =

CPR3 may refer to:

- Palmerston Airport (TC LID: CPR3)
- CPR3, a candidate phylum of bacteria
