= WS3 =

WS3 can refer to:

- WS3, a candidate phylum of bacteria from the Wurtsmith contaminated aquifer
- Waardenburg syndrome type III
- Weapons Storage and Security System
