= Fertabacteria =

Scientific classification (Candidatus)
- Domain: Bacteria
- Kingdom: incertae sedis
- Informal group: Candidate phyla radiation
- Phylum: Fertabacteria; Dudek et al. 2017

Fertabacteria is a candidate bacterial phylum of the Candidate Phyla Radiation, first proposed in 2017 after analysis of a genome from the mouth of a bottlenose dolphin. Members of this phylum are predicted to have been widely under-detected in 16S rRNA gene-based surveys of community composition due to mismatches between commonly used primers and the corresponding primer site. Fertabacteria have been retroactively detected in a variety of environments.

== Description ==
Fertabacteria is a bacterial phylum candidate status, meaning there are no cultured representatives from this phylum to date. It is a member of the Candidate Phyla Radiation and may be a sister phylum to Peregrinibacteria.

== History ==
The Fertabacteria phylum was first proposed in 2017 following the recovery and analysis of a genome from the mouth of a bottlenose dolphin. Members of this phylum are predicted to have been widely under-detected in 16S rRNA gene-based surveys of community composition due to mismatches between commonly used primers and the corresponding primer site, as has been observed for many other members of the Candidate Phyla Radiation. The name "Fertabacteria" was proposed in recognition of this characteristic, as "ferta" is Latin for "tricky".

Members of the Fertabacteria have been detected (retroactively) in a variety of environments, including the Caribbean coral Montastrea faveolata (FJ403053.1), the Guerrero Negro hypersaline microbial mat (JN443099.1), and the surface of marine macro-alga Ulva australis (DQ269036).
