= TM7x =

Scientific classification
- Domain: Bacteria
- Kingdom: incertae sedis
- Phylum: Saccharibacteria
- Class: Saccharimonia
- Order: Nanosynbacterales
- Family: Nanosynbacteraceae
- Genus: Nanosynbacter
- Species: N. lyticus

Binomial name
- Nanosynbacter lyticus

Strain of bacteria

TM7x, also known as Nanosynbacter lyticus type strain TM7x HMT 952. is a phylotype of one of the most enigmatic phyla, Candidatus Saccharibacteria, formerly candidate phylum TM7. It was the first member of Saccharibacteria to be cultivated successfully from the human oral cavity, and stably maintained in vitro. and serves as a crucial paradigm. of the newly described Candidate Phyla Radiation (CPR). The cultivated oral taxon is designated as Saccharibacteria oral taxon TM7x (NCBI taxonomy ID: 1476577). TM7x has a unique lifestyle in comparison to other bacteria that are associated with humans. It is an obligate epibiont parasite, or an "epiparasite", growing on the surface of its host bacterial species Schaalia odontolytica (formerly named Actinomyces odontolyticus) subspecies actinosynbacter strain XH001, which is referred to as the "basibiont". Actinomyces species are one of the early microbial colonizers in the oral cavity. Together, they exhibit parasitic epibiont symbiosis.

The TM7 phylum was named with reference to the Torf, mittlere Schicht (or peat, middle layer) in which it was first detected in a German peat bog. The TM7 phylum correlates positively with various human inflammatory mucosal diseases. such as periodontitis. and particularly those conditions associated with a mature anaerobic biofilm. This is probably by modifying growth conditions for competing bacterial populations. The Saccharibacteria phylum has a cosmopolitan existence, devoid of any cultivable representative for more than 2 decades since the first RNA sequence was recovered. (except the recently cultivated oral taxon TM7x) and has thus been referred to as "microbial dark matter". Saccharibacteria are part of CPR which is a recently described expansion of the tree of life encompassing more than 15% of the bacterial domain, due to shared genomic characteristics with other novel genomes in the domain Bacteria. They display reduced metabolic capabilities and a parasitic lifestyle. along with their ability to promote biofilm formation capability of the host.

== Morphology ==
TM7x are ultra-small bacteria, with a tiny cell size. They are in the form of small spherical cocci, having a diameter of about 0.2-0.3 μm. and cell volume of approximately 0.009 μm^{3}. The TM7x bacteria belong to the TM7 phylum which consist of members that are gram positive in nature. The TM7 organisms have extensive cell wall or cell peptidoglycan metabolism since several cell wall components have high producibility metrics such as peptidoglycan, bactoprenyl diphosphate, and nine different types of teichoic acids.

TM7x is an obligate epibiotic parasite, which means that it lives on the surface of another micro-organism, called the basibiont or bacterial host. Due to its parasitic nature, it disrupts the host cell eventually causing cell death, on which it is dependent for metabolic functions, instead of living as free bacteria. The TM7x cells are host specific, and are physically bound to their host, Schaalia odontolytica strain XH001 which are rod shaped. When associated with the host in a co-culture, the epibiont forms a "grape on a vine" structure.

Microscopic examinations have revealed that both TM7x and XH001 display extensive morphological changes during symbiotic growth. Different morphologies of TM7x include cocci, filamentous cell bodies, short rods as well as elongated cells. Based on their morphology, the individual TM7x cells that are attached to XH001 can be classified into cocci, cocci with various tail lengths, two connected cocci, or two slightly separated cocci. The morphologies are observed during all growth phases and resemble budding bacteria thus suggesting that TM7x cells undergo bud formation while attached to XH001, and thus divide by budding. The different morphologies may reflect different budding stages. TM7x also do not have flagella or pili and this suggests that TM7x cells adhere in a directional manner using the cell surface or membrane proteins.

During the lag, exponential and stationary phase, TM7x cells present in the co-culture appear as cocci, although slightly elongated forms are also seen. During the death phase, the TM7x cells show greater elongation, in addition to cocci and short rod morphologies.

== Physiology ==
=== Physiology ===
TM7x, just like most microbes, has an optimum temperature of 37 °C and requires anaerobic conditions, and studies suggest that an increase in oxygen negatively impacts its growth. These cells are recalcitrant to cultivation due to auxotrophy which is a result of its reduced genome. The cells lack certain metabolic pathways, which means they do not have the ability to synthesize amino acids that are essential for life. Due to this, the TM7x cells are completely dependent on their host to survive. However, the TM7x cells that are unattached to the host are viable. and can re-establish the association with the host when it is available.

TM7x is sensitive to components such as hydrogen peroxide, as well as high concentrations of sodium chloride and potassium chloride. On the other hand, growth of TM7x is apparent when fetal bovine serum is present, however it hampers the growth of its host. It has also been seen that heat shocks of about 42 °C does not alter the balance between the host and TM7x in co-cultures. Due to the attachment between TM7x and XH001, carbon dioxide can also be considered as a necessary component for the growth of TM7x cells, since it is an essential to the host XH001.

Studies conducted on 16S RNA have revealed that TM7x cells are resistant to streptomycin due to certain mutations in their genes.

=== Cultivation ===
A stable co-culture of the TM7x and XH001 can be obtained by using a medium, which has been developed to resemble the saliva, called the SHI medium, on solid agar plates, which is an oral culture medium. It is a combination of the critical ingredients of 3 media, namely PYG (peptone-yeast extract-glucose medium), BMM (basal medium mucin) and sheep blood supplemented NAM (N-acetyl muramic acid) to base ingredients such as peptone and yeast extracts. This is a targeted enrichment approach, since the medium is also supplemented with streptomycin. This allows selection of streptomycin resistant strains. For best results, the culture is incubated at 37 °C under anaerobic conditions (85% N_{2}, 10% H_{2} and 5% CO_{2}). One thing to note, however is that TM7x cells associate with XH001 with the highest abundance, under microaerophilic conditions (2.6% oxygen, 5% CO_{2}). Subcultures with increasing concentrations of streptomycin can be carried out. SHI media is superior in cultivating saliva derived oral bacteria since it contains mucin, which is the principle glycoprotein of saliva and is an important growth limiting substrate, haemin and NAM which stimulate the growth.

=== Isolation ===
To isolate TM7 from the co-culture, various physical as well as chemical treatments can be used, which involves disrupting the attachment between TM7x and XH001. The co-culture can be passed through a 28-gauge needle, after which it can be filtered using a 0.22 μm filter. Using the medium enrichment technique can reduce the TM7x containing cultures from a complex community to a dual species co culture.

=== Identification ===
TM7x cells can be observed using microscopic techniques such as light microscopy, Transmission Electron Microscopy (TEM), which can be used to describe the microbial cell envelope, Scanning Electron Microscopy (SEM), which helped characterize the interactions between as XH001 and TM7x, and con-focal laser scanning microscope that distinguishes between the host and TM7x cells. Genetic approaches, such as complete DNA sequencing or whole genome sequencing. and 16S RNA sequencing. define the microbiome, as well as the relationship between TM7x and its host. The TM7x cells can also been observed using microfluidic devices. Fluorescent in situ hybridization (FISH) can be used to observe cell separation. and single cells can be acquired using flow cytometry. to conduct genetic analysis. These methods, in conjunction with well-established sample preparation, staining techniques and co-culturing using enrichment techniques, will allow proper cultivation and sequencing of TM7x cells. Microscopy coupled with recent advances in hardware and software make these methods indispensable.

== Ecology ==
=== Interactions with specific host A. odontolyticus XH001 ===
The two micro-organisms exhibit dynamic interactions, since TM7x is obligately and exclusively physically associated with its host Schaalia odontolytica strain XH001, with various phases that include co-existence, induction of lysis in addition to exospore formation. This is an example of parasitic ectosymbiosis. and it represents a novel inter-species interaction in the oral microbiota. Due to the inability to produce its own amino acids, it is apparent that the epibiont is fully dependent on A. odontolyticus XH001 for its nutrients. However, under certain conditions, TM7x can become parasitic, thus killing its host, which is an unusual interaction for oral micro-organisms.

=== Association of TM7x and XH001 ===
Studies suggest that physical attachment of TM7x with XH001 has both positive and negative effects on the XH001 cells.

==== Negative effects of association ====
- Induction of elongation, branching and hyphal formation in cells.
- Increased expression of stress related genes causing cell stress. and reduction in viability.
- Decrease in the doubling time.
- Induction of a cellular response similar to that of depletion of oxygen.
- Augmentation of a biofilm via AI-2 quorum sensing, forming a rougher and thicker (in height) biofilm as well as increased biovolume which hinders recognition of the immune system.

==== Positive effects of the association ====
- TM7x cells can effectively conceal their host from the human immune system response by inhibiting TNF-α mRNA expression in macrophages, which are induced by the presence of the host.
- Promotion of metabolite exchange.

=== Life cycle patterns ===
The association between TM7x and XH001 shifts from biotrophic (under nutrient replete conditions) to necrotrophic (under starvation or late nutrient deplete conditions). Both TM7x and XH001 show reciprocal changes under varying nutritional conditions:

Under nutritionally replete environments

Under normal conditions, TM7x is an obligate epibiont, and co-exists well. TM7x cells cause slight elongation and branching in XH001 cells, by keeping them healthy, which provides the epibiont with a larger surface area to grow.

Under starvation conditions

Under conditions of starvation, the TM7x cells remain vital and multiply. However, the host cells (XH001) lose their viability, due to disrupted or compromised cell membranes, when associated with TM7x, and some develop exospore-like structures, which result in the drastic reduction the TM7x cells. This negative impact on viability of host cells due to the obligate surface attachment indicates the parasitic nature of TM7x. The TM7x cells display a transformation from small cocci to elongated cells (which may be due to stress response) and induce a variety of severe changes in cell morphologies of XH001, such as swollen cell bodies, clubbed ends, and lysis.

=== Interactions with other organisms ===
When TM7x cells are co-cultured with other micro-organisms, related to its specific host, such as A. naeslundii, A. viscosus, A. meyeri, amongst others, no physical association is established. This suggests that TM7x and XH001 might have evolved together during their establishment in the mouth.

== Genomics ==
The TM7x genome is completely sequenced. and has a more streamlined genome than the other phylotypes, which may be due to its specific human microbiome habitat. The genome is highly reduced (probably due to its dependence on the host). and has a relatively small size of 705 kb (approx. 705,138 bp). It ranks among the smallest bacteria found on the human body or in nature. It reveals a limited metabolic repertoire (complete deficiency in amino acid synthetic capacity), which may explain its dependency on the host and the necessity to parasitize it. It has been postulated that the dependence of TM7x cells on the host has allowed further genome reduction, in comparison to the other TM7 phylotypes.

The genome consists of about 711 genes, of which there are 46 RNA genes, (43 tRNAs and 3 rRNAs), and a protein count of 693. It has a coding density of 93%. and is very dense in the production of toxins as well as virulent molecules, such as cytotoxic necrotizing factor 1, haemolysin toxin protein as well as type III secretion protein. The GC content of the genome is 44.5%. A list of all the core genes, shared by all genomes of Saccharibacteria as well as the unique genes possessed by the TM7x, has been published. A strikingly highly conserved gene synteny has been sustained between a huge fraction of the TM7x genome and the aquifer- and sludge bioreactor-associated TM7. The TM7x genome contains a high number of genes that encode proteins with transmembrane domains, to obtain nutrients from its host XH001, but contains a low gene percentage that encodes proteins with signal peptides.

Various hypotheses are proposed to describe the reductive genomic evolution, which is observed in these host-dependent bacterial lineages, such as the streamlining hypothesis, the black queen hypothesis and the increase of protein multifunctionality. Endosymbiont metabolisms follow inverse evolutionary pathways during genome reduction where some enzymes have relaxed specificity to compensate for gene number reduction.

== Transcriptomics and metabolomics ==
Transcriptomic data allows analysis and comparisons of gene expressions, profiles of secreted molecules, gene functions and products which are important for successfully establishing a symbiotic relationship. Transcriptomic data shows that about 340 genes in XH001 are differentially regulated under coculture conditions.

Approximately 70 genes belonging to XH001 genes are up-regulated when XH001 is physically associated with TM7x. These include genes that encode functions related to general stress related responses such as stress related proteins and transcriptional regulators, induced turgor stress-related response, a ribosomal subunit interface protein that binds to machinery of the ribosomes, inhibiting protein biosynthesis, Cys-tRNA-Pro deacylase which prevents addition of amino acids to the tRNA molecule, inhibiting protein translation, TA-encoding systems which include toxin component GNAT family, prevent-host death family protein, YefM TA system and addiction module toxin-RelE family; potassium efflux system KefA homolog, biosynthesis of essential amino acids and transporters. Apart from this, studies also suggest that when TM7x is associated with XH001, the gene encoding the lsrB ortholog which functions as a receptor for the AI-2 signalling molecule is highly upregulated. Comparatively, the genes encoding potassium uptake, putative membrane proteins, and ompA expression, known to encode an immunogenic protein were down-regulated.

The TM7x cells are capable of several common metabolic processes, such as glycolysis, the TCA cycle, nucleotide biosynthesis and some amino acid biosynthesis and salvage pathways. Genes coding for glycosyl hydrolase family enzymes have been observed, suggesting that these cells may use oligosaccharides as growth substrates, as well as Arginine, which is another potential growth substrate (arginine deiminase pathway). Genes for ABC transporters are also identified that are likely to be responsible for oligopeptide uptake, indicating that TM7 cells are capable of using other amino acids also.

There is evidence of a base substitution in the 16S rRNA genes, which is highly atypical, and is associated with antibiotic resistance against streptomycin. On the consensus 16S rRNA, on position 912, C is substituted with U and this is linked to resistance against streptomycin.

== Pathogenesis ==
When periodontal disease is initiated due to the pathogens present in microbial biofilms, certain harmful by-products and enzymes are produced that break down the collagen or host cell membranes to allow invasion. Certain inflammatory cytokines induce inflammation when the macrophages detect pathogens as part of its defence mechanism, such as the tumour necrosis factor (α-TNF). TM7x can be considered a potential pathogen since it is associated with inflammatory mucosal disease and detected more frequently at these sites. Studies conducted on J2 immortalized bone marrow macrophages (BMMs) have shown that the host XH001 induces the α-TNF gene expression, however when associated with TM7x cells, this expression is greatly reduced. This indicates that TM7x can suppress the α-TNF gene expression in the macrophages or prevent the detection of its host by macrophages.

TM7x is established as an organism that produces toxins and virulence factors, and encodes membrane associated virulence proteins such as OmpA and LemA, type IV secretion systems, and proteins that bind choline. It is also capable of inducing resistance to streptomycin in its host XH001 and thus pose potential threat to humans, as they are involved in various human systemic diseases. including but not limited to vaginal diseases and chronic inflammation in the digestive tract. Actinomyces species are one of the early microbial colonizers in the oral cavity and the relationship between XH001 with TM7x may influence the composition and pathogenesis of oral microbiota, since a homeostatic balance must be maintained between the host and bacteria.

The TM7x genome contains several open reading frames that encode an abortive infection protein homolog that limits replication of the phage within a bacterial population, also promoting cell death and also encode predicted proteins with toxin-antitoxin (TA) domains, such as VapB, VapC, and xenobiotic response element. These proteins may play roles in the maintenance of the parasitic status of TM7x against XH001.
