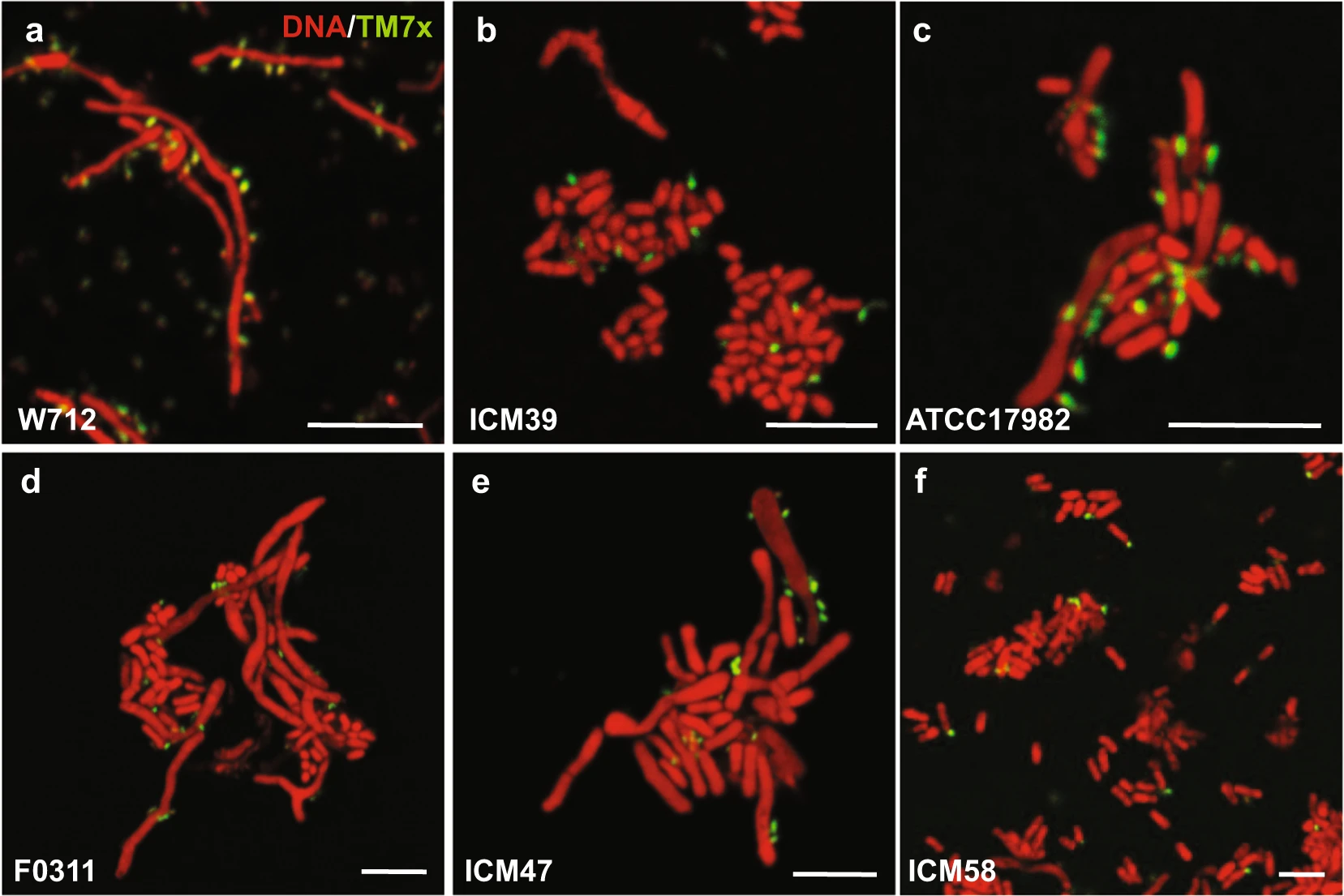
- Ca. Nanosynbacter lyticus (aka TM7x, green) and bacterial hosts (red). Scale bars are 5 μm.

Scientific classification (Candidatus)
- Domain: Bacteria
- (unranked): CPR group
- Phylum: Saccharibacteria Albertsen et al. 2013
- Class: "Saccharimonadia" corrig. McLean et al. 2020
- Order: "Saccharimonadales" corrig. McLean et al. 2020

Families
- "Nanogingivalaceae"; "Nanoperiodontomorbaceae"; "Nanosynbacteraceae"; "Nanosyncoccaceae"; "Saccharimonadaceae"

Synonyms
- Candidate division TM7

= Saccharibacteria =

Bacterial lineage

Saccharibacteria, formerly known as TM7, is a major bacterial lineage. It was discovered through 16S rRNA sequencing.

A few Saccharibacteria species have been cultured. All of them are obligate parasites of bacterial hosts with small cell and genome sizes. The first species to be isolated, TM7x, is an epibiont of Schaalia odontolytica strain XH001 (formerly known as Actinomyces odontolyticus) with the ability to kill its host. The full genome sequence revealed a highly reduced genome (705kB) and a complete lack of amino acid biosynthetic capacity. An axenic culture of TM7 from the oral cavity was reported in 2014 but no sequence or culture was made available.

Along with Candidate Phylum TM6, it was named after sequences obtained in 1994 in an environmental study of a soil sample of peat bog in Germany where 262 PCR amplified 16S rDNA fragments were cloned into a plasmid vector, named TM clones for Torf, Mittlere Schicht (lit. peat, middle layer). It has been found in several environments since such as from activated sludges, water treatment plant sludge rainforest soil, human saliva, in association with sponges, cockroaches, gold mines, acetate-amended aquifer sediment, and other environments (bar thermophilic), making it an abundant and widespread phylum.

== Properties ==
TM7 specific FISH probes identified species from a bioreactor sludge revealed the presence of a gram-positive cell envelopes and several morphotypes: a sheathed filament (abundant), a rod occurring in short chains, a thick filament and cocci; the former may be the cause of Eikelboom type 0041 (bulking problems of activated sludges). The majority of bacterial phyla are Gram-negative diderms, whereas only the Bacillota, the Actinomycetota and Chloroflexota are monoderms.

Saccharibacteria are part of the human oral microbiota, but their role in human health is unclear.

A characteristic feature of known Saccharibacteria is the inability to synthesize some amino acids, vitamins, and other important molecules. They are thus believed to be parasites or symbionts that obtain nutrients from a bacterial host. A small number of species have been successfully cultured by placing them into cultures of host bacteria.

Over 50 different phylotypes have been identified and it has a relatively modest intradivision 16S rDNA sequence divergence of 17%, which ranges from 13 to 33%.^{[needs update]} An interactive phylogenetic tree of TM7, built using jsPhyloSVG, allows for quick access to GenBank sequences and distance matrix calculations between tree branches.

Stable-isotope probing studies have found that some members of this phylum can degrade toluene.

== Taxonomy ==
120 marker proteins based GTDB 10-RS226

- Saccharimonadales
  - "Ca. Chaera"
  - - "Ca. Nanoperiodontomorbus"
    - - - "Ca. Nanogingivalis"
        - "Ca. Nanosyncoccus"
      - - "Ca. Microsaccharimonas"
        - - "Ca. Mycolatisynbacter"
          - - "Ca. Saccharimonas"
            - "Ca. Nanosynbacter"

Rappe & Giovannoni 2003

- Patescibacteria (CPR)
  - - - Parcubacteria group (OD1)
        - ABY1 (OD1-ABY1)
        - Gracilibacteria (BD1-5 group)
    - - Microgenomates (OP11 group)
      - Dojkabacteria (WS6)
  - - Saccharibacteria (TM7)
    - - SC3
      - - WS5
        - Guaymas1 (Thermodesulfobacteriota-related)

Dinis et al. 2011

- Saccharibacteria
  - Saccharibacteria I
  - - Saccharibacteria II
    - - Saccharibacteria IV
      - - TM7a group
        - Saccharibacteria III

TM7 Candidate Division neighbor-joining phylogenetic tree

The currently accepted taxonomy is based on the List of Prokaryotic names with Standing in Nomenclature (LPSN) and National Center for Biotechnology Information (NCBI)

- Class "Saccharimonadia" corrig. McLean et al. 2020 ["Nanoperiodontomorbia" corrig. McLean et al. 2020; "Nanosyncoccia" corrig. McLean et al. 2020]
  - Order "Saccharimonadales" McLean et al. 2020 ["Nanogingivalales" corrig. McLean et al. 2020; "Nanoperiodontomorbales" corrig. McLean et al. 2020; "Nanosynbacterales" McLean et al. 2020; "Nanosyncoccales" McLean et al. 2020]
    - ?"Ca. Nanosynsaccharibacterium" corrig. McLean et al. 2020
      - "Ca. N. primum" corrig. McLean et al. 2020 em. Kostovski, Oren & Göker 2025 (G1_3_12lb)
    - ?"Ca. Southlakia" Wang et al. 2023
      - "Ca. S. epibionticum" Wang et al. 2023
    - Family AMD01
      - "Ca. Chaera" corrig. Lemos et al. 2019
        - "Ca. C. renei" corrig. Lemos et al. 2019
    - Family "Nanoperiodontomorbaceae" corrig. McLean et al. 2020
      - "Ca. Nanoperiodontomorbus" corrig. McLean et al. 2020
        - "Ca. N. periodonticus" corrig. McLean et al. 2020
    - Family "Nanogingivalaceae" McLean et al. 2020
      - "Ca. Nanogingivalis" McLean et al. 2020
        - "Ca. N. gingivitcus" McLean et al. 2020
    - Family "Nanosyncoccaceae" McLean et al. 2020
      - "Ca. Nanosyncoccus" McLean et al. 2020
        - ?"Ca. N. oralis" Gilroy et al. 2023
        - "Ca. N. alces" McLean et al. 2020
        - "Ca. N. nanoralicus" McLean et al. 2020
    - Family UBA1547
      - "Ca. Microsaccharimonas" corrig. Lemos et al. 2019 ["Candidatus Saccharibacter" Lemos et al. 2019 non Jojima et al. 2004] (AMD02)
        - "Ca. M. sossegonensis" corrig. Lemos et al. 2019
    - Family UBA10027
      - "Ca. Mycolatisynbacter" corrig. Batinovic et al. 2021 ["Ca. Mycosynbacter" Batinovic et al. 2021] (JR1)
        - "Ca. M. gordoniilyticus" corrig. Batinovic et al. 2021 ["Ca. Mycosynbacter amalyticus" Batinovic et al. 2021]
    - Family "Saccharimonadaceae" McLean et al. 2020
      - "Ca. Saccharimonas" Albertsen et al. 2013
        - "Ca. S. aalborgensis" Albertsen et al. 2013
    - Family "Nanosynbacteraceae" McLean et al. 2020
      - "Ca. Nanosynbacter" McLean et al. 2020 ["Ca. Minimicrobia" Ibrahim et al. 2021] (TM7x)
        - ?"Ca. Minimicrobia naudis" Ibrahim et al. 2021 [GCA_018866225.1]
        - ?"Ca. N. colneyensis" Gilroy et al. 2023
        - ?"Ca. N. gullae" Gilroy et al. 2023
        - ?"Ca. N. norwichensis" Gilroy et al. 2023
        - ?"Ca. N. quadrami" Gilroy et al. 2023
        - "Ca. N. featherlites" McLean et al. 2020
        - "Ca. N. lyticus" McLean et al. 2020
        - "Ca. Minimicrobia vallesae" Ibrahim et al. 2021
