= Wirthbacteria =

Scientific classification (Candidatus)
- Domain: Bacteria
- (unranked): CPR group
- Phylum: Wirthbacteria Hug et al. 2016
- Genus: Ca. Wirthibacter Probst et al. 2017

Type species
- Ca. Wirthibacter wanneri Probst et al. 2017

Proposed bacterial phylum

Candidatus Wirthbacteria is a proposed monotypic bacterial phylum containing only one known sample from the Crystal Geyser aquifer, Ca. Wirthibacter wanneri. This bacterium stands out in some trees of life, as it is closely related to Candidate phyla radiation but is not considered part of it.
