= Katanibacteriota =

"Candidatus Katanibacteriota"

Scientific classification (Candidatus)
- Domain: Bacteria
- Kingdom: incertae sedis
- Informal group: Candidate phyla radiation
- Phylum: "Candidatus Katanibacteriota" corrig. Hug et al. 2016

Synonyms
- "Candidatus Katanobacteria" Hug et al. 2016

Phylum of bacteria

"Candidatus Katanibacteriota" is a bacterial phylum formerly known as WWE3. It has candidatus status, meaning there are no cultured representatives, and is a member of the Candidate Phyla Radiation (CPR).

The Katanibacteriota phylum was first proposed in 2008 following the analysis of 16S rRNA gene sequences from a mesophilic anaerobic digester. The name "Katanibacteriota" comes from the Hebrew word "katan", which translates to "small". This is presumably a nod to the small cell size and/or genome size of members of this phylum (and most members of the CPR).
