= Magnetobacterium bavaricum =

Scientific classification (Candidatus)
- Domain: Bacteria
- Kingdom: Pseudomonadati
- Phylum: Nitrospirota
- Class: Nitrospira
- Order: Nitrospirales
- Family: Nitrospiraceae
- Genus: "Candidatus Magnetobacterium"
- Species: M. bavaricum

Binomial name
- Magnetobacterium bavaricum Spring et al. 1993

Species of bacterium

"Candidatus Magnetobacterium bavaricum" is a species of bacterium.

== Morphology and physiology ==
Ca. M. bavaricum is a large rod shaped gram negative microorganism that ranges from 8um-10um in length and 1.5um-2um in width. These microorganisms are motile by a single polar flagella and orient themselves by use of magnetotaxis. Ca. M. bavaricum were found to contain upwards of 1,000 magnetosomes per cell which is far more than required for cell orientation along the Earth's magnetic field and the execution of magnetotactic behaviors. These hook-shaped magnetite crystals arrange themselves in three to six bundles of multiple chains along the organism and create magnetic moments for the cell that allow polar magnetotaxis while the cell propels itself forward via the singular flagella. These organisms are observed containing a range from zero-twenty intracellular globules containing elemental sulfur believed to aid in a sulfur oxidizing metabolism for energy production by providing an energy reservoir.

== Habitat ==
This species has been found within sediments of freshwater lakes in Upper Bavaria, Germany and is difficult to culture due to being a gradient organism occupying microaerobic zoned environments also known as the OAI zone. Although this species has been identified within a small layer of sediment, it appears to account for approximately 30% of the biovolume in Lake Chiemsee surface sediments indicating it may be a dominant fraction of the microbial community found within this layer of sediment.
