= Berkeliibacteriota =

"Candidatus Berkeliibacteriota"

Scientific classification (Candidatus)
- Domain: Bacteria
- Kingdom: incertae sedis
- Informal group: Candidate phyla radiation
- Phylum: "Candidatus Berkeliibacteriota" corrig. Wrighton et al. 2014

Synonyms
- "Candidatus Berkelbacteria" Wrighton et al. 2014

Bacterial phylum

"Candidatus Berkeliibacteriota" (formerly ACD58) is a bacterial phylum with candidate status, meaning there are no cultured representatives for this group. It is part of the Candidate Phyla Radiation.

Berkeliibacteriota was first reported in 2012, at which time it was classified as a divergent lineage of Parcubacteria (OD1) and referred to as ACD58. It was proposed as a phylum in 2014. Representatives of this phylum have been detected in a variety of environments, including a deep thermokarst lake in the Sasapimakwananisikw River Valley (QC, Canada), an acetate-amended alluvial aquifer adjacent to the Colorado River (CO, USA), and marine sediments from the Peru Margin seafloor.
