= Nomuraibacteriota =

"Candidatus Nomuraibacteriota"

Scientific classification (Candidatus)
- Domain: Bacteria
- Kingdom: incertae sedis
- Informal group: Candidate phyla radiation
- Phylum: "Candidatus Nomuraibacteriota" corrig. Brown et al. 2015

Synonyms
- "Candidatus Nomurabacteria" Brown et al. 2015

Phylum of bacteria

"Candidatus Nomuraibacteriota" is a candidatus phylum of bacteria belonging to the CPR group. They are ultra-small bacteria that have been found in a wide variety of environments, mainly in sediments under anaerobic conditions.

Bacteria of this phylum share several of their characteristics with other ultra-small bacteria, nanometric size, small genomes, reduced metabolism, and low capacity to synthesize nucleotides and aminoacids. They also lack respiratory chains and the Krebs cycle. In addition, many can be endosymbionts of larger bacteria.

Phylogenetic analyzes have suggested that Nomuraibacteriota and the other ultra-small bacteria make up the most basal clade of all bacteria. The archaea of the Nanobdellati kingdom are ultra-small archaea that share the same characteristics with these bacteria and are the most basal group of the archaeo-eukaryotic clade, although it can also be paraphyletic of eukaryotes and the other archaea as will be seen below.

In some phylogenetic analyzes of the proteome, ultra-small bacteria emerge outside the traditional bacterial domain and instead emerge as a paraphyletic group of traditional Bacteria and the clade composed of archaea and eukaryotes. In these analyzes Nomuraibacteriota turns out to be the most basal clade of all cellular organisms.

== Phylogeny ==
Proteome analyzes have shown that Nomuraibacteriota can be the most basal clade of cellular organisms and that the other CPR bacteria are a paraphyletic group as can be seen in the cladogram that shows the phylogenetic relationships between multiple bacterial, archaean and eukaryotes.

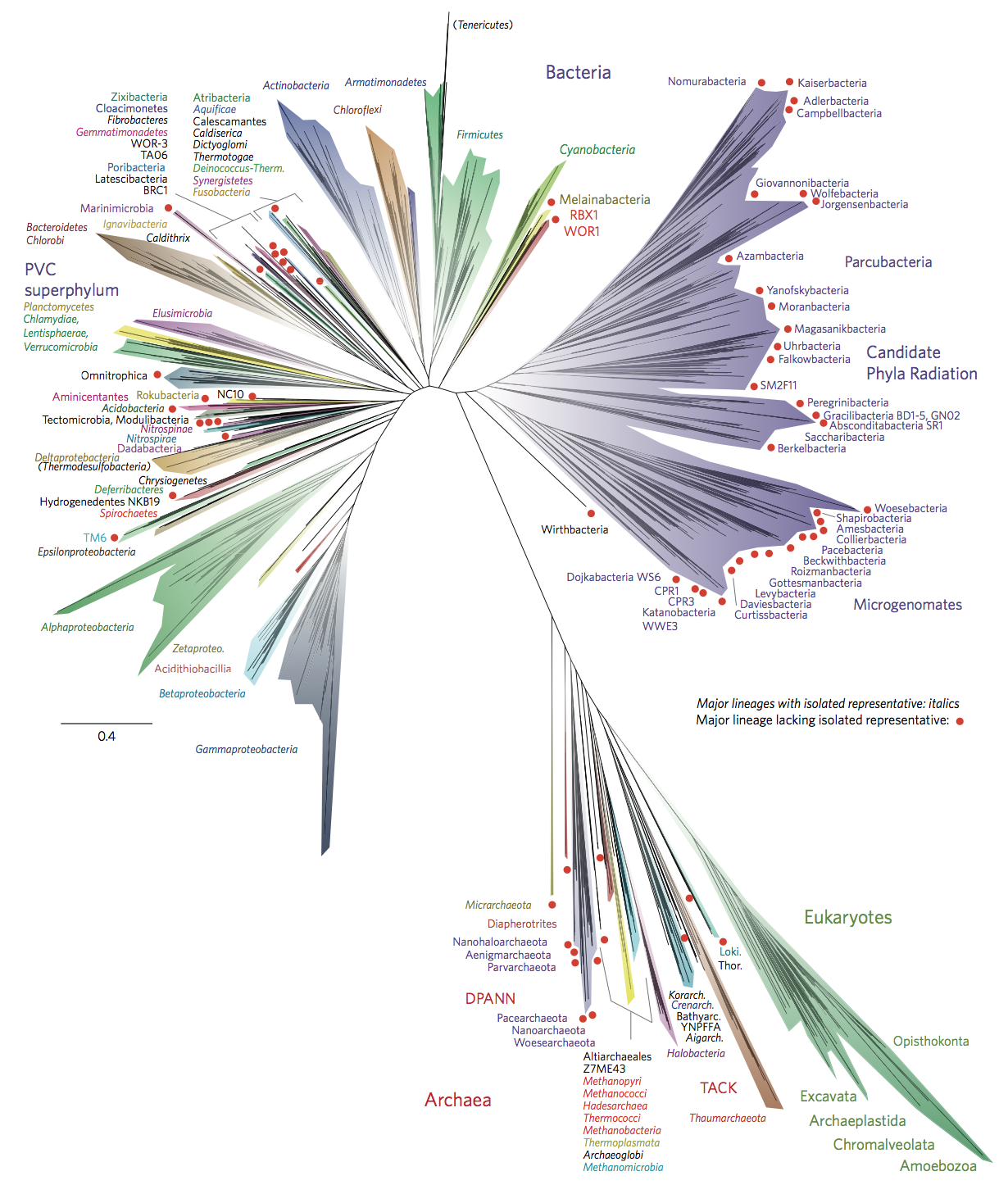
A 2016 metagenomic representation of the tree of life using ribosomal protein sequences
