= Gracilibacteria =

Scientific classification (Candidatus)
- Domain: Bacteria
- (unranked): CPR group
- Phylum: "Gracilibacteria" Rinke et al. 2013

Type genus
- "Ca. Altimarinus"

Type species
- "Ca. A. pacificus" Rinke et al. 2013

Phylum of bacteria

Gracilibacteria is a bacterial candidate phylum formerly known as GN02, BD1-5, or SN-2. It is part of the Candidate Phyla Radiation and the Patescibacteria group.

The first representative of the Gracilibacteria phylum was reported in 1999 after being recovered from a deep-sea sediment sample. The representative 16S rRNA sequence was referred to as "BD1-5" (sample BD1, sequence 5) and while it was noted that it displayed low sequence identity to any known 16S rRNA gene, it was not proposed as a new phylum at this time. In 2006, representatives of Gracilibacteria were recovered from a hypersaline microbial mat from Guerrero Negro, Baja California Sur, Mexico and proposed as a new phylum "GN02". The name "Gracilibacteria" was proposed for the BD1-5/GN02 lineage in 2013, based on a substantial expansion of the genomic representation of this phylum.

The first Gracilibacteria genome was recovered from an acetate-amended aquifer (Rifle, CO, USA) using culture-independent, genome-resolved metagenomic techniques in 2012. Genomic analyses suggest that members of the Gracilibacteria phylum have limited metabolisms and are likely symbionts or endosymbionts. Members of Gracilibacteria use an alternative genetic code in which UGA encodes the glycine amino acid instead of a stop codon

== Phylogeny ==
120 marker proteins based GTDB 10-RS226

- "Gracilibacteria" cluster
  - "Vampirococcia"
    - "Ca. Altimarinus" {BD1-5: UBA6164}
    - "Absconditicoccaceae" {"Absconditabacterales"}
  - "Gracilibacteria"
    - "Abawacabacteriales" (RBG-16-42-10)
    - - "Peregrinibacterales" (UBA1369)
      - - "Fallacibacteriales" (UBA4473)
        - "Peribacteraceae" {"Peribacterales"}

== Taxonomy ==
The currently accepted taxonomy is based on the List of Prokaryotic names with Standing in Nomenclature (LPSN) and National Center for Biotechnology Information (NCBI).

Clade "Gracilibacteria" cluster

- Class "Vampirococcia" Pallen, Rodriguez-R & Alikhan 2022 (SR1; JAEDAM01)
  - Order "Absconditibacterales" Yakimov et al. 2022 corrig. Kostovski, Oren & Göker 2025
    - Family "Absconditicoccaceae" Yakimov et al. 2022
      - ?Genus "Candidatus Strigamonas" Bouderka et al. 2024
        - Species "Ca. S. methylophilicida" Bouderka et al. 2024
      - Genus "Candidatus Absconditicoccus" Yakimov et al. 2022
        - Species "Ca. A. praedator" Yakimov et al. 2022
      - Genus "Candidatus Vampirococcus" Guerrero et al. 1986 non Kizina 2017
        - Species "Ca. V. lugosii" Moreira et al. 2021
  - Order BD1-5
    - Family UBA6164
      - Genus "Candidatus' Altimarinus" Rinke et al. 2013
        - Species "Ca.' A. pacificus" Rinke et al. 2013
- Class "Gracilibacteriia" Yakimov et al. 2022
  - Order "Peribacterales" Anantharaman et al. 2016
    - Family "Peribacteraceae" Anantharaman et al. 2016
      - Genus "Candidatus Peribacter" Anantharaman et al. 2016
        - Species "Ca. P. riflensis" Anantharaman et al. 2016
