= Omnitrophica =

"Omnitrophota"

Scientific classification (Candidatus)
- Domain: Bacteria
- Kingdom: Pseudomonadati
- Phylum: "Omnitrophota" corrig. Rinke et al. 2013

Classes
- "Omnitrophia"; "Velamenicoccia"

Synonyms
- "Omnitrophica" Rinke et al. 2013

Phylum of bacteria

"Omnitrophica" or "Omnitrophota" is a candidate phylum of bacteria with chemolithoautotrophic nutrition. It was previously known as candidate phylum OP3. These bacteria appear to thrive in anoxic environments, such as deep marine sediments, hypersaline environments, freshwater lakes, aquifers, flooded soils, and methanogenic bioreactors. Genomic analyzes have found genes responsible for the construction of magnetosomes, which are also present in other phyla of bacteria. These organelles have magnetic properties, which causes bacteria to orient themselves magnetically in the environment. Omnitrophica is part of the "PVC" superphylum along with the phyla Planctomycetota, Verrucomicrobiota and Chlamydiota with which it shares a common ancestor.

== Classification ==
The currently accepted taxonomy is based on the List of Prokaryotic names with Standing in Nomenclature (LPSN) and National Center for Biotechnology Information (NCBI).

120 marker proteins based GTDB 10-RS226

- - "Omnitrophia"
    - "Omnitrophales"
      - - "Omnitrophaceae"
          "Ca. Omnitrophus" Rinke et al. 2013
      - - - "Abzuiibacteriaceae"
            "Ca. Abzuiibacterium" Seymour et al. 2022
          - "Danuiimicrobiaceae"
            "Ca. Danuiimicrobium" Seymour et al. 2022
        - - "Aquincolibacteriaceae"
            - "Ca. Taenariivivens" Seymour et al. 2022
            - - "Ca. Multiplicimicrobium" Seymour et al. 2022
              - - "Ca. Pegaeibacterium" Seymour et al. 2022
                - "Ca. Aquincolibacterium" Seymour et al. 2022
  - "Velamenicoccia"
    - - "Aquiviventales"
        - "Aquiviventaceae"
          "Ca. Aquivivens" Seymour et al. 2022
    - - - - "Gorgyraeales"
            - "Gorgyraeaceae"
              "Ca. Gorgyraea" Williams et al. 2021 [UBA10183]
        - - - "Pluralincolimonadales"
              - "Pluralincolimonadaceae"
                "Ca. Pluralincolimonas" Seymour et al. 2022
            - "Taenaricolales"
              - "Taenaricolaceae"
                "Ca. Taenaricola" Seymour et al. 2022
          - - "Aquitaenarimonadales"
              - "Aquitaenariimonadaceae"
                "Ca. Aquitaenariimonas" Seymour et al. 2022
            - "Tantalellales"
              - "Tantalellaceae"
                - "Ca. Omnitrophus magneticus" Kolinko et al. 2016
                - - "Ca. Tantalella" Williams et al. 2021
                  - - "Ca. Aadella" Williams et al. 2021
                    - "Ca. Makaraimicrobium" Seymour et al. 2022
      - - - "Kappaeales"
            - "Kappaeaceae"
              "Ca. Kappaea" Williams et al. 2021
          - "Velesiimonadales"
            - "Velesiimonadaceae"
              "Ca. Velesiimonas" Seymour et al. 2022
        - - - "Kaelpiales"
              - "Kaelpiaceae"
                - "Ca. Kaelpia" Williams et al. 2021
                - "Ca. Saelkia" Williams et al. 2021
          - - - "Duberdicusellales"
                - "Duberdicusellaceae"
                  "Ca. Duberdicusella" Seymour et al. 2022
                - 4484‑171
                  "Ca. Susuluia" corrig. Williams et al. 2021
            - - - "Zapsychrales"
                  - - "Aceulaceae" (sic)
                      "Ca. Aceella" corrig. Williams et al. 2021
                  - - "Zapsychraceae"
                      "Ca. Zapsychrus" Williams et al. 2021
                    - "Fredricksoniimonadaceae"
                      "Ca. Fredricksoniimonas" Seymour et al. 2022
              - - - "Ghiorseimicrobiales"
                    - "Ghiorseimicrobiaceae"
                      "Ca. Ghiorseimicrobium" Seymour et al. 2022
                  - "Velamenicoccales"
                    - "Velamenicoccaceae"
                      - "Ca. Phelpsiimicrobium" Seymour et al. 2022
                      - "Ca. Velamenicoccus" Kizina et al. 2022
                - - "Gygaeellales"
                    - "Gygaeellaceae"
                      "Ca. Gygaeella" corrig. Williams et al. 2021
                    - "Profunditerraquicolaceae"
                      - "Ca. Undivivens" Seymour et al. 2022
                      - - "Ca. Profunditerraquicola" Seymour et al. 2022
                        - "Ca. Sherwoodlollariibacterium" Seymour et al. 2022

Notes:

- "Velamenicoccia" incertae sedis:
  - "Candidatus Orphnella" Williams et al. 2021
- "Tantalellaceae" incertae sedis:
  - "Candidatus Thioglobulicalix" Seymour et al. 2022
- "Profunditerraquicolaceae" incertae sedis:
  - "Candidatus Amyimicrobium" Seymour et al. 2023
  - "Candidatus Fontinolimonas" Seymour et al. 2022
