= Microgenomates =

Scientific classification (Candidatus)
- Domain: Bacteria
- Kingdom: incertae sedis
- Informal group: Candidate phyla radiation
- Superphylum: Microgenomatota corrig. Rinke et al. 2013 in Ogen and Göker 2023

Supergroup of bacteria

The Microgenomatota or Microgenomates are a proposed supergroup of bacterial candidate phyla in the Candidate Phyla Radiation.

Organisms from the Microgenomates group have never been cultured in a lab; rather they have only been detected in the environment through genetic sequencing.

The Microgenomates group was originally discovered from sequences retrieved from the Yellowstone National Park hot spring "Obsidian Pool" and named OP11.

The group was later split into the additional bacterial phyla Absconditabacteria (SR1) and Parcubacteria (OD1) and then into over 11 more bacterial phyla, including Curtisbacteria, Daviesbacteria, Levybacteria, Gottesmanbacteria, Woesebacteria, Amesbacteria, Shapirobacteria, Roizmanbacteria, Beckwithbacteria, Collierbacteria, Pacebacteria.

== Phylogeny ==
120 marker proteins based GTDB 10-RS226

- "Microgenomatia"
  - - "Woykebacterales" (CG2-30-54-11)
    - - "Curtissbacterales"
      - "Daviesbacterales"
  - - - "Roizmanbacterales" (UBA1406)
      - - "Gottesmanbacterales" (UBA10105)
        - "Levybacterales"
    - - - "Shapirobacterales" (UBA12405)
        - - GWA2‑44‑7
            - "Amesbacteraceae"
            - - "Blackburnbacteraceae" (UBA10165)
              - "Woesebacteraceae" (UBA8517)
      - - "Chazhemtobacteriales"
          - "Beckwithbacteraceae" (CG1-02-47-37)
          - - - "Collierbacteraceae" (UBA12108)
              - "Chazhemtonibacteraceae"
            - - "Chisholmbacteraceae"
              - - "Cerribacteraceae" (UBA12028)
                - "Pacebacteraceae" (PJMF01)

== Taxonomy ==
The currently accepted taxonomy is based on the List of Prokaryotic names with Standing in Nomenclature (LPSN) and National Center for Biotechnology Information (NCBI).

Clade "Candidate Phyla Radiation" group

- Phylum Minisyncoccota Nakajima et al. 2025
  - Clade "Microgenomates" cluster
    - Class "Microgenomatia" Herrmann et al. 2019
      - Genus "Candidatus Microgenomatus" Rinke et al. 2013
        - Species "Ca. Microgenomatus auricola" Rinke et al. 2013
      - Order "Roizmanbacterales" [UBA1406]
        - Family "Laneganaceae" Pallen, Rodriguez-R & Alikhan 2022 [GWC2-37-13]
          - Genus "Roizmanbacterium" Geesink et al. 2020
      - Order "Chazhemtobacteriales" (sic) Pallen, Rodriguez-R & Alikhan 2022 [UBA1400]
        - Family "Chazhemtonibacteriaceae" Kadnikov et al. 2020 corrig. Oren & Garrity 2022
          - Genus "Candidatus Chazhemtonibacterium" Kadnikov et al. 2020 corrig. Oren & Garrity 2022
            - Species "Ca. Chazhemtonibacterium aquaticum" Kadnikov et al. 2020 corrig. Oren & Garrity 2022
