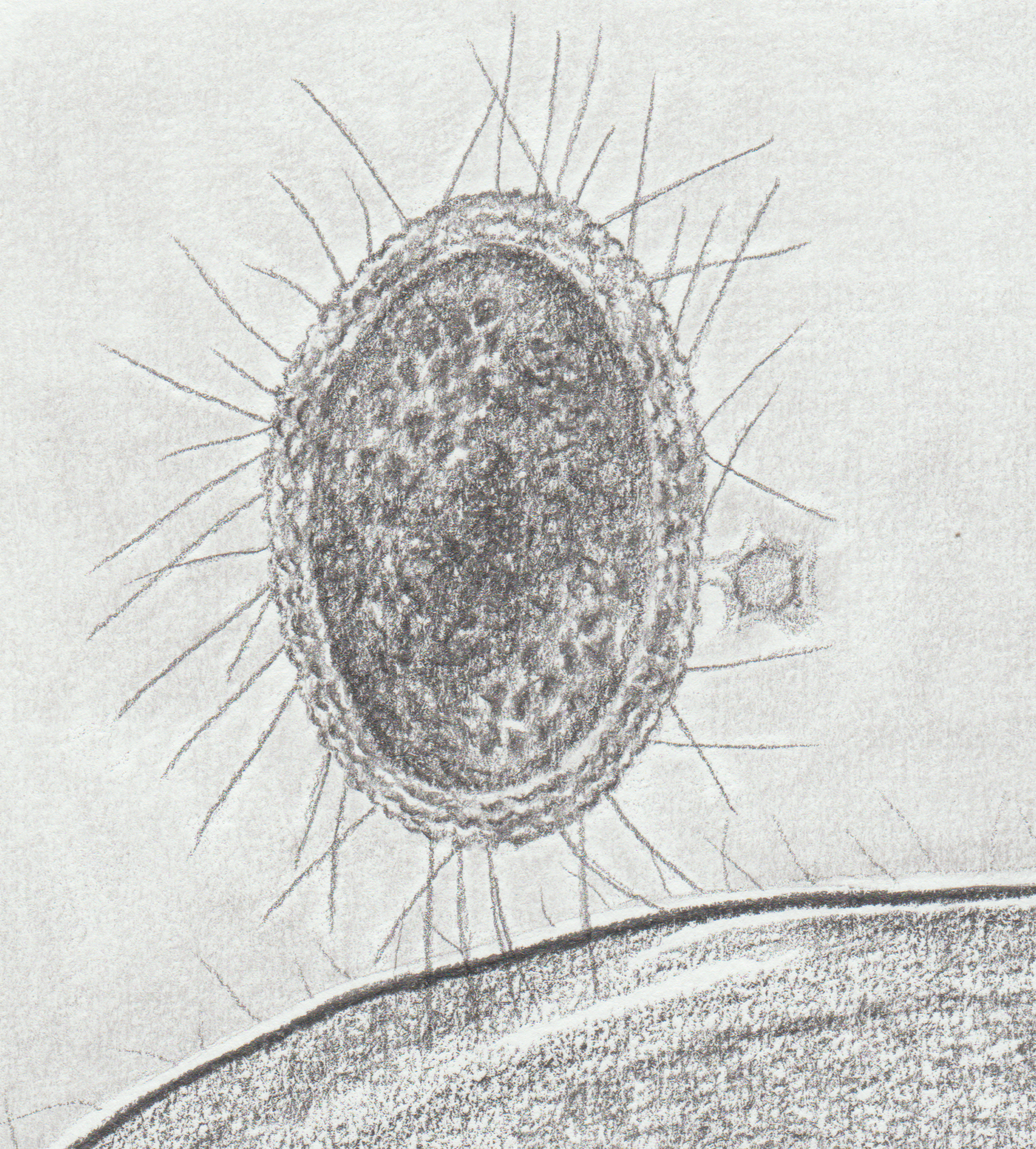
- Drawing of a CPR bacterium from a "GWB1" sample.

Scientific classification
- Domain: Bacteria
- Kingdom: incertae sedis
- Informal group: Bacteria candidate phyla
- Informal group: Candidate phyla radiation

Phyla
- "Elulimicrobiota"; Minisyncoccota

Synonyms
- Superphylum: "Patescibacteria" Rinke et al. 2013; Phylum: "Patescibacteria" Parks et al. 2018; "Patescibacteriota" Dutkiewicz et al. 2025

= Candidate phyla radiation =

Evolutionary radiation of bacterial lineages

The candidate phyla radiation (also referred to as CPR group) is a large evolutionary radiation of bacterial lineages whose members are mostly uncultivated and only known from metagenomics and single cell sequencing. They have been described as nanobacteria (not to be confused with non-living nanoparticles of the same name) or ultra-small bacteria due to their reduced size (nanometric) compared to other bacteria.

Originally (circa 2016), it has been suggested that CPR represents over 15% of all bacterial diversity and may consist of more than 70 different phyla. However, the Genome Taxonomy Database (2018) based on relative evolutionary divergence found that CPR represents a single phylum, with earlier figures inflated by the rapid evolution of ribosomal proteins. CPR lineages are generally characterized as having small genomes and lacking several biosynthetic pathways and ribosomal proteins. This has led to the speculation that they are likely obligate symbionts.

Earlier work proposed a superphylum called Patescibacteria which encompassed several phyla later attributed to the CPR group. Therefore, Patescibacteria and CPR are often used as synonyms. The former name is not necessarily obsolete: for example, the GTDB uses the similar name Patescibacteriota because they consider the CPR group a phylum.

== Characteristics ==
Although there are a few exceptions, members of the candidate phyla radiation generally lack several biosynthetic pathways for several amino acids and nucleotides. To date, there has been no genomic evidence that indicates that they are capable of producing the lipids essential for cell envelope formation. Additionally, they tend to lack complete TCA cycles and electron transport chain complexes, including ATP synthase. This lack of several important pathways found in most free-living prokaryotes indicates that the candidate phyla radiation is composed of obligate fermentative symbionts.

Furthermore, CPR members have unique ribosomal features. While the members of CPR are generally uncultivable, and therefore missed in culture-dependent methods, they are also often missed in culture-independent studies that rely on 16S rRNA sequences. Their rRNA genes appear to encode proteins and have self-splicing introns, features that are rarely seen in bacteria, although they have previously been reported. Owing to these introns, members of CPR are not detected in 16S-dependent methods. Additionally, all CPR members are missing the L30 ribosomal protein, a trait that is often seen in symbionts.

Many of its characteristics are similar or analogous to those of ultra-small archaea (Nanobdellati).

== Phylogeny ==
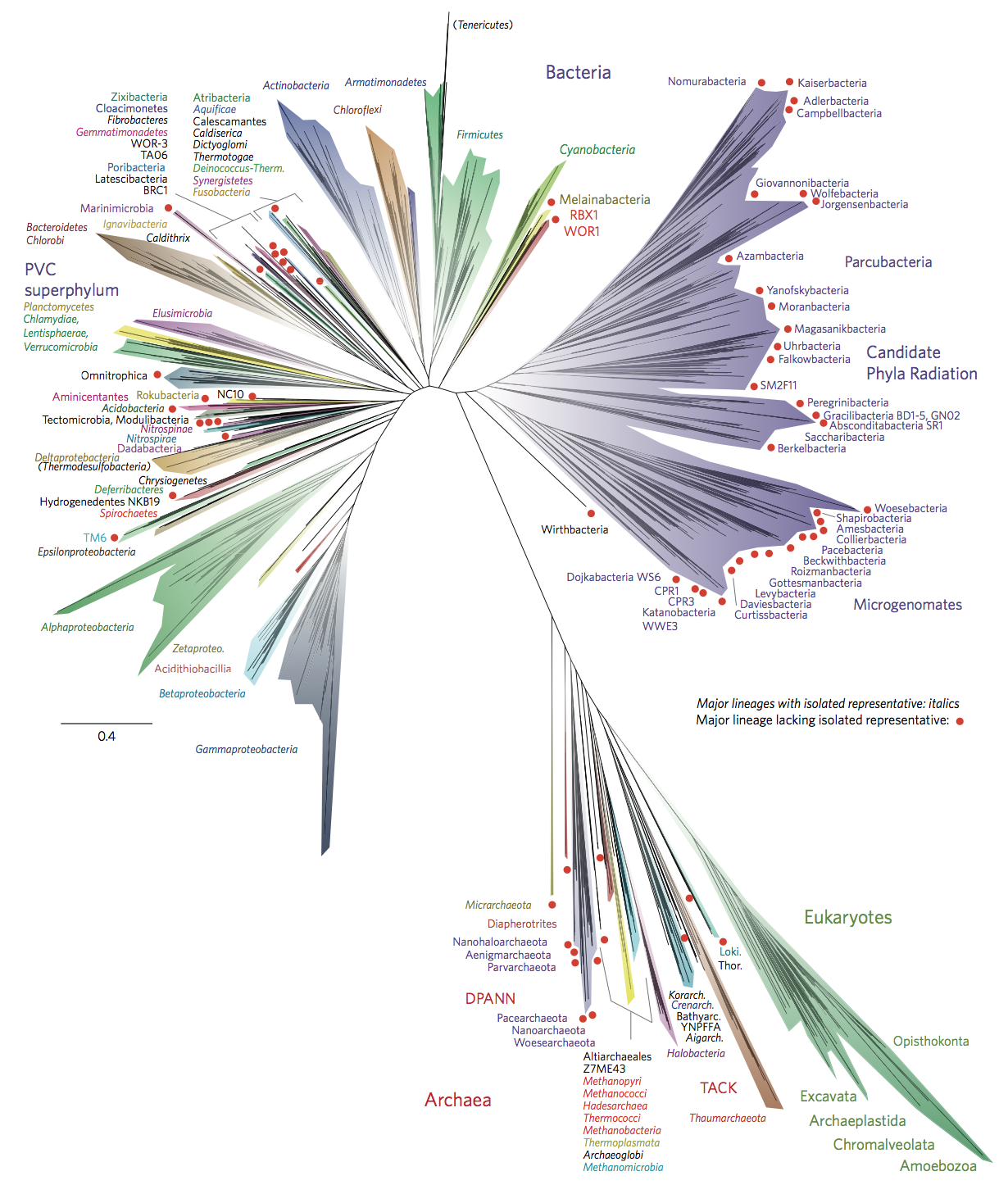
A 2016 tree of life based on ribosomal proteins.

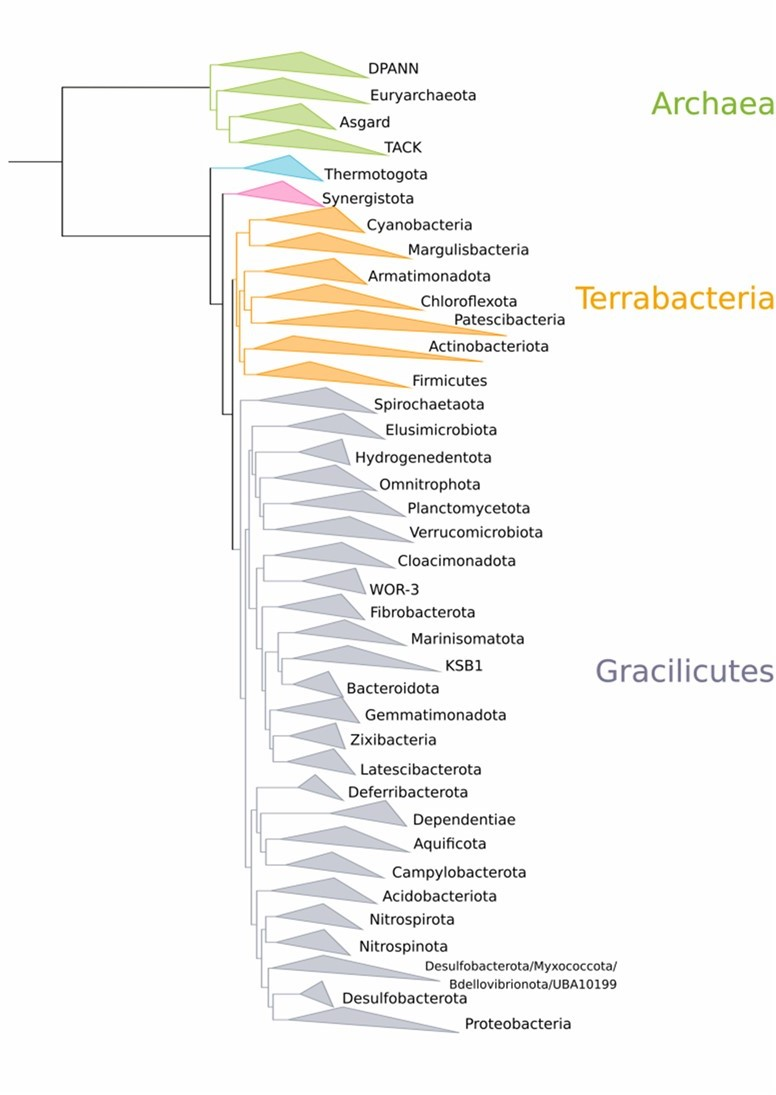
Phylogeny of bacteria and archaea based on ribosomal proteins and RNA polymerase subunits

The Candidate phyla radiation was found to be sister to all other bacteria according to some early phylogenetic analyses of this group based on ribosomal proteins and protein family occurrence profiles. These studies found the following phylogeny between phyla and superphyla. The superphyla are shown in bold.

- Bacteria
  - The other bacteria
  - **CPR**
    - Wirthbacteria
    - - - Dojkabacteria
        - - Katanobacteria
          - **Microgenomates**
      - - - Berkelbacteria
          - Saccharibacteria
        - - - Peregrinibacteria
            - - Absconditabacteria
              - Gracilibacteria
          - **Parcubacteria**

However, several recent studies have suggested that the CPR belongs to Bacillati and is more closely related to Chloroflexota. The evolutionary relationships that are typically supported by these studies are as follows.

- Bacteria
  - Gracilicutes
  - Bacillati
    - DST
    - - Cyanobacteria/Melainabacteria
      - - - Bacillota and Mycoplasmatota
          - Actinomycetota
        - - - Armatimonadota
            - Eremiobacteraeota
          - - **CPR**
            - - Dormibacteraeota
              - Chloroflexota

== Provisional taxonomy ==
Because many CPR members are uncultivable, they cannot be formally put into the bacterial taxonomy, but a number of provisional, or Candidatus, names have been generally agreed on. As of 2017, two superphyla are generally recognized under CPR, Parcubacteria and Microgenomates. The phyla under CPR include:

Phylogeny of Minisyncoccota Nakajima et al. 2025

- - "Wirthbacteria" (CG2-30-54-11)
  - - - "Microgenomates" cluster
        - "Dojkabacteria"
        - - "Katanobacteria" (WWE3)
          - "Microgenomatia"
    - - - "Gracilibacteria" cluster
          - "Absconditabacteria" (JAEDAM01)
          - "Gracilibacteria"
      - - "Saccharibacteria" cluster
          - "Berkelbacteria" (UBA1384)
          - - "Kazanbacteria" (Kazan)
            - - "Howlettbacteria" (CPR2)
              - "Saccharimonadia"
        - "Parcubacteria" cluster
          - - "Andersenbacteria"
            - "Doudnabacteria"
          - - - "Torokbacteria" (GCA-2792135)
              - "Patescibacteriia" (ABY1)
            - Minisyncoccia

Phylogeny of Microgenomatia

- - - "Woykebacterales" (CG2-30-54-11)
    - - "Curtissbacterales"
      - "Daviesbacterales"
  - - - "Levybacterales"
      - - "Gottesmanbacterales" (UBA10105)
        - "Roizmanbacterales" (UBA1406)
    - - - "Chazhemtobacteriales"
          - "Beckwithbacteraceae" (CG1-02-47-37)
          - - "Chazhemtonibacteraceae"
            - - "Chisholmbacteraceae"
              - - "Collierbacteraceae" (UBA12108)
                - - "Cerribacteraceae" (UBA12028)
                  - "Pacebacteraceae" (PJMF01)
      - - "Shapirobacterales" (UBA12405)
        - GWA2‑44‑7
          - "Amesbacteraceae"
          - - "Blackburnbacteraceae" (UBA10165)
            - "Woesebacteraceae" (UBA8517)

Phylogeny of Gracilibacteria

- - "Absconditabacteria"
    - "Ca. Altimarinus" {BD1-5: UBA6164}
    - "Absconditicoccaceae" {"Absconditabacterales"}
  - "Gracilibacteria"
    - "Fallacibacteriales" (UBA4473)
    - - "Abawacabacteriales" (RBG-16-42-10)
      - - "Peregrinibacterales" (UBA1369)
        - "Peribacterales"

Phylogeny of "Patescibacteriia"

- - "Kerfeldbacterales" (SBBC01)
  - - - - "Jacksonbacterales" (UBA9629)
        - "Veblenbacterales"
      - - "Komeilibacterales" (UBA1558)
        - "Kuenenbacterales" (UBA2196)
    - - - "Magasanikbacterales"
        - "Uhrbacterales" (SG8-24)
      - - "Buchananbacterales"
        - - "Moisslbacterales" (UBA2591)
          - - "Patescibacteriales"
            - "Falkowbacterales" (BM507)

Phylogeny of Minisyncoccia

- - "Moranbacterales"
  - - - "Phycocordibacterales"
        - "Nomurabacteraceae" (UBA9973)
        - - "Campbellbacteraceae" (UBA12079)
          - - - "Vogelbacteraceae" (XYD1-FULL-46-19)
              - "Yonathbacteraceae" (UBA1539)
            - - - "Taylorbacteraceae" (PALSA-1337)
                - "Zambryskibacteraceae"
              - - "Ca. Minusculum" {UBA2103}
                - - "Adlerbacteraceae" (SBAW01)
                  - "Phycocordibacteraceae" ["Kaiserbacteraceae"] (UBA2163)
    - - - - "Parcunitrobacterales" (GWA2-38-13b)
          - "Portnoybacterales"
        - - "Azambacterales" (UBA10092)
          - - - "Yanofskybacterales" (2-02-FULL-40-12)
              - - "Spechtbacterales"
                - "Terrybacterales"
            - - "Sungbacterales"
              - - - "Giovannonibacterales" (UBA11713)
                  - "Ryanbacterales"
                - - "Niyogibacterales" (HO2-45-28)
                  - "Tagabacterales"
      - - UBA6257
          - "Brennerbacteraceae"
          - - "Jorgensenbacteraceae" (GWB1-50-10)
            - - "Liptonbacteraceae" (2-01-FULL-56-20)
              - - "Colwellbacteraceae" (UBA9933)
                - - "Harrisonbacteraceae" (WO2-44-18)
                  - "Wolfebacteraceae" (UBA9933)
        - Minisyncoccales
          - "Gribaldobacteraceae" (CG1-02-41-26)
          - - Minisyncoccaceae
            - - "Wildermuthbacteraceae" (UBA10102)
              - - "Paceibacteraceae" ("Parcubacteria")
                - - "Nealsonbacteraceae" (PWPS01)
                  - "Staskawiczbacteraceae"

- ?"Elulimicrobiota" Rodriguez-R et al. 2020
- Clade "Patescibacteria" Rinke et al. 2013 non Parks et al. 2018
  - "Wirthbacteria" Hug et al. 2016
  - Microgenomates Cluster
    - "Dojkabacteria" Wrighton et al. 2016 (WS6)
    - "Katanobacteria" Hug et al. 2016b (WWE3)
    - Superphylum Microgenomates
      - ?"Microgenomates" Rinke et al. 2013
      - "Woykebacteria" Anantharaman et al. 2016 (RIF34)
      - "Curtissbacteria" Brown et al. 2015
      - "Daviesbacteria" Brown et al. 2015
      - "Roizmanbacteria" Brown et al. 2015
      - "Gottesmanbacteria" Brown et al. 2015
      - "Levybacteria" Brown et al. 2015
      - "Shapirobacteria" Brown et al. 2015
      - Clade GWA2-44-7
        - ?"Genascibacteria" He et al. 2021
        - "Amesbacteraceaeia" Brown et al. 2015
        - "Blackburnbacteria" Anantharaman et al. 2016 (RIF35)
        - "Woesebacteria" Brown et al. 2015 (DUSEL-2, DUSEL-4)
      - Clade "Chazhemtobacteriales" Pallen, Rodriguez-R & Alikhan 2022 [UBA1400]
        - "Beckwithbacteria" Brown et al. 2015
        - "Collierbacteria" Brown et al. 2015 (MFAQ01)
        - "Chazhemtonibacteraceae" corrig. Kadnikov et al. 2020
        - "Chisholmbacteria" Anantharaman et al. 2016 (RIF36)
        - "Cerribacteria" Kroeger et al. 2018
        - "Pacebacteria" Brown et al. 2015 (PJMF01)
  - Saccharibacteria Cluster
    - "Berkelbacteria" Wrighton et al. 2014 (ACD58)
    - "Kazanbacteria" Jaffe et al. 2020 (Kazan)
    - "Howlettbacteria" Probst et al. 2018 (CPR2)
    - "Saccharimonadia" Albertsen et al. 2013 (TM7)
  - Gracilibacteria Cluster
    - Clade "Absconditabacteria"
      - "Absconditabacteria" Hug et al. 2016b (SR1)
      - "Ca. Altimarinus" Rinke et al. 2013 {BD1-5: UBA6164} (GN02)
    - Superphylum "Gracilibacteria"
      - "Abawacabacteria" Anantharaman et al. 2016 (RIF46)
      - "Peregrinibacteria" Brown et al. 2015 (PER)
      - "Fallacibacteriota" Dudek et al. 2017 ["Fertabacteria" (sic)] (DOLZORAL124_38_8)
      - "Peribacteria" Anantharaman et al. 2016
  - Parcubacteria Cluster
    - ?"Baikalibacteria" Haro-Moreno et al. 2023
    - "Doudnabacteria" Anantharaman et al. 2016 (SM2F11)
    - "Andersenbacteria" Anantharaman et al. 2016 (RIF9)
    - "Torokbacteria" Probst et al. 2018
    - Superphylum "Patescibacteria" (ABY1)
      - ?"Brownbacteria" Danczak et al. 2017
      - "Kerfeldbacteria" Anantharaman et al. 2016 (RIF4)
      - "Jacksonbacteria" Anantharaman et al. 2016 (RIF38)
      - "Komeilibacteria" Anantharaman et al. 2016 (RIF6)
      - "Kuenenbacteria" Brown et al. 2015
      - "Veblenbacteria" Anantharaman et al. 2016 (RIF39)
      - "Magasanikbacteria" Brown et al. 2015
      - "Uhrbacteria" Brown et al. 2015 (SG8-24)
      - "Buchananbacteria" Anantharaman et al. 2016 (RIF37)
      - "Patescibacteria" (sic) Parks et al. 2018 non Rinke et al. 2013
      - "Falkowbacteria" Brown et al. 2015
      - "Moisslbacteria" Probst et al. 2018
    - Superphylum Parcubacteria
      - ?"Montesolbacteria " He et al. 2021
      - "Moranbacteria" Brown et al. 2015 (OD1-i)
      - Clade UBA6257
        - "Brennerbacteria" Anantharaman et al. 2016 (RIF18)
        - "Jorgensenbacteria" Brown et al. 2015
        - "Wolfebacteria" Brown et al. 2015
        - "Colwellbacteria" Anantharaman et al. 2016 (RIF41)
        - "Harrisonbacteria" Anantharaman et al. 2016 (RIF43)
        - "Liptonbacteria" Anantharaman et al. 2016 (RIF42)
      - "Spechtbacteria" Anantharaman et al. 2016 (RIF19)
      - "Terrybacteria" Anantharaman et al. 2016 (RIF13)
      - "Parcunitrobacteria" Castelle et al. 2017 (GWA2-38-13b)
      - "Portnoybacteria" Anantharaman et al. 2016 (RIF22)
      - Clade "Paceibacteria"
        - ?Minisyncoccota Nakajima et al. 2025
        - "Wildermuthbacteria" Anantharaman et al. 2016 (RIF21)
        - "Gribaldobacteria" Probst et al. 2018
        - "Paceibacteria" (sic) Brown et al. 2015
        - "Nealsonbacteria" Anantharaman et al. 2016 (RIF40)
        - "Staskawiczbacteria" Anantharaman et al. 2016 (RIF20)
      - "Azambacteria" Brown et al. 2015
      - "Yanofskybacteria" Brown et al. 2015
      - "Sungbacteria" Anantharaman et al. 2016 (RIF17)
      - "Ryanbacteria" Anantharaman et al. 2016 (RIF10)
      - "Giovannonibacteria" Brown et al. 2015
      - "Niyogibacteria" Anantharaman et al. 2016 (RIF11)
      - "Tagabacteria" Anantharaman et al. 2016 (RIF12)
      - Clade UBA9973
        - ?"Hugbacteria" Danczak et al. 2017
        - ?"Llyodbacteria" Anantharaman et al. 2016 (RIF45)
        - "Vogelbacteria" Anantharaman et al. 2016 (RIF14)
        - "Yonathbacteria" Anantharaman et al. 2016 (RIF44)
        - "Nomurabacteria" Brown et al. 2015
        - "Adlerbacteria" Brown et al. 2015
        - "Kaiserbacteria" Brown et al. 2015
        - "Campbellbacteria" Brown et al. 2015
        - "Taylorbacteria" Anantharaman et al. 2016 (RIF16)
        - "Zambryskibacteria" Anantharaman et al. 2016 (RIF15)

The current phylogeny is based on ribosomal proteins (Hug et al., 2016). Other approaches, including protein family existence and 16S ribosomal RNA, produce similar results at lower resolutions.

== See also ==
- Bacterial phyla § Uncultivated phyla and metagenomics for some of the phyla in CPR.
