= Bacterial phyla =

Phyla of the domain Bacteria

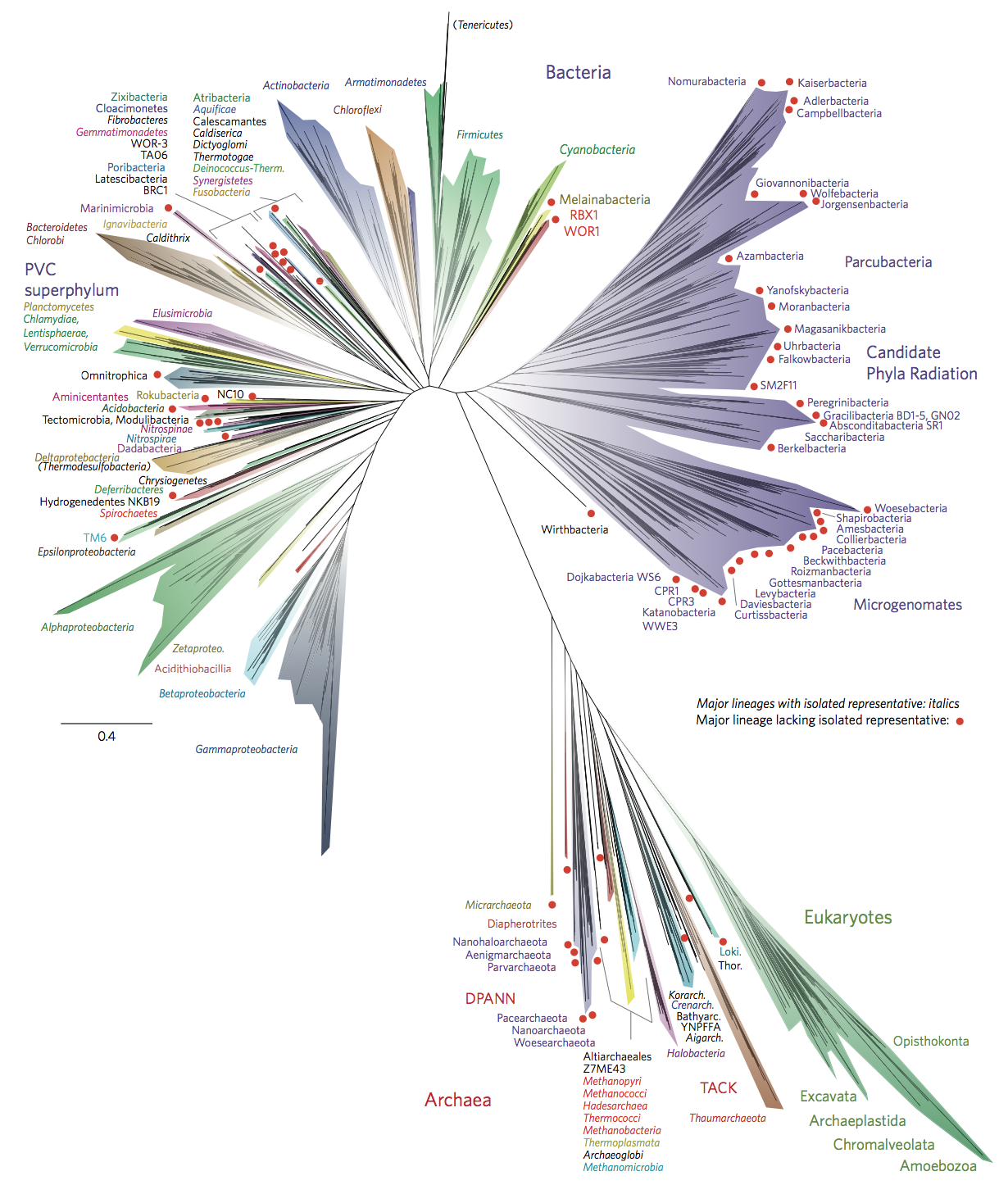
Phylogenetic tree showing the diversity of Bacteria, Archaea, and Eukaryota. Major lineages are assigned arbitrary colours and named, with well-characterized lineage names, in italics. Lineages lacking an isolated representative are highlighted with non-italicized names and red dots.

Bacterial phyla constitute the major lineages of the domain Bacteria. While the exact definition of a bacterial phylum is debated, a popular definition is that a bacterial phylum is a monophyletic lineage of bacteria whose 16S rRNA genes share a pairwise sequence identity of ~75% or less with those of the members of other bacterial phyla.

It has been estimated that ~1,300 bacterial phyla exist. As of May 2020, 41 bacterial phyla are formally accepted by the LPSN, 89 bacterial phyla are recognized on the Silva database, dozens more have been proposed, and hundreds likely remain to be discovered. As of 2017, approximately 72% of widely recognized bacterial phyla were candidate phyla (i.e. have no cultured representatives).

The rank of phylum has been included in the rules of the International Code of Nomenclature of Prokaryotes, using the ending –ota for phylum names that must be based on the name of a genus as its nomenclatural type.

== List of bacterial phyla ==
The following is a list of bacterial phyla that have been validly published as of December 2023.

Published Phyla
Phylum	Alternative names	Group	Known classes	Notes
Abditibacteriota	FBP		1	
Acidobacteriota	Acidobacteria		5	
Actinomycetota	Actinobacteria	Bacillati	6	
Armatimonadota	Armatimonadetes, OP10	Bacillati	3	
Atribacterota	OP9, JS1		1	
Aquificota	Aquificae		3	
Bacteroidota	Bacteroidetes	FCB group	6	
Balneolota			1	
Bdellovibrionota			3	
Caldisericota	OP5, Caldiserica	FCB group		
Calditrichota		FCB group		
Campylobacterota			2	
Chlamydiota	Chlamydiae	PVC group	1	
Chlorobiota	Chlorobi	FCB group	1	
Chloroflexota	Chloroflexi	Bacillati		
Chrysiogenota	Chrysiogenetes			
Coprothermobacterota				
Cyanobacteriota	Cyanobacteria	Bacillati	2	
Deferribacterota	Deferribacteres			
Deinococcota	Deinococcus–Thermus	Bacillati	1	
Dictyoglomota	Dictyoglomi			
Elusimicrobiota	Elusimicrobia, OP7, Termite Group 1 (TG1)			
Fibrobacterota	Fibrobacteres	FCB group		
Bacillota	Firmicutes	Bacillati	9	
Fusobacteriota	Fusobacteria		1	
Gemmatimonadota	Gemmatimonadetes	FCB group		
Ignavibacteriota	Ignavibacteria, ZB1	FCB group		
Kiritimatiellota				
Lentisphaerota	Lentisphaerae, vadinBE97	PVC group		
Marinimicrobia	SAR406, Marine Group A	FCB group		
Myxococcota			3	
Nitrospinota	Nitrospinae			
Nitrospirota	Nitrospirae			
Planctomycetota	Planctomycetes	PVC group		
Pseudomonadota	Proteobacteria			
Rhodothermota				
Saccharibacteria	TM7	CPR; Saccharibacteria-related CPR		
Spirochaetota	Spirochaetes			
Synergistota	Synergistetes			
Mycoplasmatota	Tenericutes			
Thermodesulfobacteriota	Thermodesulfobacteria			
Thermomicrobiota	Thermomicrobia			
Thermotogota	Thermotogae, OP2, EM3			
Verrucomicrobiota	Verrucomicrobia	PVC group		

The following is a list of candidate phyla that have not been cultured.

Candidate Phyla
Phylum	Alternative Names	Group	Notes
Absconditabacteria	SR1	CPR; Gracilibacteria-related CPR	
ABY1	OD1-ABY1	CPR; Parcubacteria	
Aerophobota / Aerophobetes	CD12, BHI80-139		
Andersenbacteria	RIF9	CPR; Parcubacteria; Parcubacteria 4-related	
Aminicenantota	OP8		
Berkeliibacteriota	ACD58	CPR; Saccharibacteria-related CPR	
Bipolaricaulota	OP1, Acetothermia		
Blackburnbacteria	RIF35	CPR; Microgenomates	
Brennerbacteria	RIF18	CPR; Parcubacteria; Parcubacteria 3	
Brownbacteria		CPR; Parcubacteria; unclassified Parcubacteria	
Buchananbacteria	RIF37	CPR; Parcubacteria; Parcubacteria 1	
Campbellbacteria		CPR; Patescibacteria; Parcubacteria; Parcubacteria 4	Seems to be polyphyletic; 2 clades
Cloacimonetes	WWE1	FCB group	
Coatesbacteria	RIF8		
Collierbacteria		CPR; Patescibacteria; Microgenomates	
Colwellbacteria	RIF41	CPR; Parcubacteria; Parcubacteria 3	
Curtissbacteria		CPR; Patescibacteria; Microgenomates	
Dadabacteria			No
Daviesbacteria		CPR; Patescibacteria; Microgenomates	No
Delphibacteria		FCB group	No
Delongbacteria	RIF26, H-178		No
Dependentiae	TM6		
Dojkabacteria	WS6	CPR; Microgenomates-related CPR	
Dormibacteraeota	AD3		
Doudnabacteria	SM2F11	CPR; Parcubacteria; Parcubacteria 1-related	
Edwardsbacteria	RIF29, UBP-2		
Eisenbacteria	RIF28	FCB group	
Eremiobacteraeota	WPS-2, Palusbacterota		
Falkowbacteria		CPR; Patescibacteria; Parcubacteria; Parcubacteria 1	
Fermentibacteria	Hyd24-12		
Fertabacteria		CPR; Gracilibacteria-related CPR	
Firestonebacteria	RIF1		
Fervidibacteria	OctSpa1-106		
Fischerbacteria	RIF25		
Fraserbacteria	RIF31		
Glassbacteria	RIF5		No
Giovannonibacteria		CPR; Patescibacteria; Parcubacteria; Parcubacteria 4-related	No
Gottesmanbacteria		CPR; Patescibacteria; Microgenomates	No
Gracilibacteria	GN02, BD1-5, SN-2	CPR; Patescibacteria; Gracilibacteria-related CPR	No
Gribaldobacteria		CPR; Parcubacteria; Parcubacteria 2	No
Handelsmanbacteria	RIF27		No
Harrisonbacteria	RIF43	CPR; Parcubacteria; Parcubacteria 3	No
Howlettbacteria		CPR; Saccharibacteria-related CPR	No
Hugbacteria		CPR; Parcubacteria; unclassified Parcubacteria	
Hydrogenedentes	NKB19		
Jacksonbacteria	RIF38	CPR; Parcubacteria; Parcubacteria 1	
Jorgensenbacteria		CPR; Patescibacteria; Parcubacteria; Parcubacteria 3	
Kaiserbacteria		CPR; Patescibacteria; Parcubacteria; Parcubacteria 4	
Katanibacteriota	WWE3	CPR; Microgenomates-related	
Kazanbacteria	Kazan	CPR; Saccharibacteria-related CPR	
Kerfeldbacteria	RIF4	CPR; Parcubacteria; Parcubacteria 1	
Komeilibacteria	RIF6	CPR; Parcubacteria; Parcubacteria 1	
Kryptonia			
Krumholzibacteriota			
Kuenenbacteria		CPR; Patescibacteria; Parcubacteria; Parcubacteria 1	
Lambdaproteobacteria	RIF24	Proteobacteria	
Latescibacteria	WS3	FCB group	
Levybacteria		CPR; Patescibacteria; Microgenomates	No
Lindowbacteria	RIF2	CPR; Saccharibacteria-related CPR	No
Liptonbacteria	RIF42	CPR; Parcubacteria; Parcubacteria 3	No
Lloydbacteria	RIF45	CPR; Parcubacteria; Parcubacteria 4	No
Magasanikbacteria		CPR; Patescibacteria; Parcubacteria; Parcubacteria 1	No
Margulisbacteria	RIF30		No
Melainabacteria			
Microgenomates	OP11	CPR; Patescibacteria	
Modulibacteria	KSB3, GN06		
Moranbacteria	OD1-i	CPR; Patescibacteria; Parcubacteria; unclassified Parcubacteria	
Muproteobacteria	RIF23	Proteobacteria	
NC10			
Nealsonbacteria	RIF40	CPR; Parcubacteria; Parcubacteria 2	
Niyogibacteria	RIF11	CPR; Parcubacteria; Parcubacteria 4-related	
Nomuraibacteriota		CPR; Patescibacteria; Parcubacteria; Parcubacteria 1	
Omnitrophica	OP3	PVC group	
Pacebacteria		CPR; Patescibacteria; Microgenomates	
Parcubacteria	OD1	CPR	
Parcubacteria 1		CPR; Parcubacteria	
Parcubacteria 2		CPR; Parcubacteria	
Parcubacteria 3		CPR; Parcubacteria	
Parcubacteria 4		CPR; Parcubacteria	
Parcunitrobacteria		CPR; Parcubacteria; unclassified Parcubacteria	
PAUC34f	sponge‐associated unclassified lineage (SAUL)	FCB group	
Peregrinibacteria	PER	CPR; Gracilibacteria-related CPR	
Peribacteria		CPR; Gracilibacteria-related CPR	
Poribacteria		PVC group	
Portnoybacteria	RIF22	CPR; Parcubacteria; Parcubacteria 4-related	
Raymondbacteria	RIF7		
Riflebacteria	RIF32		
Roizmanbacteria		CPR; Patescibacteria; Microgenomates	
Rokubacteria			
Ryanbacteria	RIF10	CPR; Parcubacteria; Parcubacteri 4-related	
Saltatorellota			
Schekmanbacteria	RIF3	Proteobacteria	
Shapirobacteria		CPR; Patescibacteria; Microgenomates	
Spechtbacteria	RIF19	CPR; Parcubacteria; Parcubacteria 2	
Staskawiczbacteria	RIF20	CPR; Parcubacteria; Parcubacteria 2	
Sumerlaeota	BRC1		
Sungbacteria	RIF17	CPR; Parcubacteria; Parcubacteria 4-related	
TA06			
Tagabacteria	RIF12	CPR; Parcubacteria; Parcubacteria 4-related	
Taylorbacteria	RIF16	CPR; Parcubacteria; Parcubacteria 4	
Tectomicrobia			
Terrybacteria	RIF13	CPR; Parcubacteria; Parcubacteria 2	
Torokbacteria		CPR; Parcubacteria; unclssified Parcubacteria	
UBP-1			
Uhrbacteria		CPR; Patescibacteria; Parcubacteria; Parcubacteria 1	
Veblenbacteria	RIF39	CPR; Parcubacteria; Parcubacteria 1-related	
Vogelbacteria	RIF14	CPR; Parcubacteria; Parcubacteria 4	
Wallbacteria	RIF33		
Wildermuthbacteria	RIF21	CPR; Parcubacteria; Parcubacteria 2	
Wirthbacteria		CPR-related bacteria	
Woesebacteria		CPR; Patescibacteria; Microgenomates	
Wolfebacteria		CPR; Patescibacteria; Parcubacteria; Parcubacteria 3	
Woykebacteria	RIF34	CPR; Microgenomates	
Yanofskybacteria		CPR; Patescibacteria; Parcubacteria; unclassified Parcubacteria	
Yonathbacteria	RIF44	CPR; Parcubacteria; Parcubacteria 4	
Zambryskibacteria	RIF15	CPR; Parcubacteria; Parcubacteria 4	
ZB2	OD1-ZB2	CPR; Parcubacteria	
Zixibacteria		FCB group	

== Supergroups ==
Despite the unclear branching order for most bacterial phyla, several groups of phyla consistently cluster together and are referred to as supergroups or superphyla. In some instances, bacterial clades clearly consistently cluster together but it is unclear what to call the group. For example, the Candidate Phyla Radiation includes the Patescibacteria group which includes Microgenomates group which includes over 11 bacterial phyla. The LPSN recognizes four kingdoms of bacteria as validly published: Bacillati, Fusobacteriati, Pseudomonadati and Thermotogati.

=== Candidate phyla radiation (CPR) ===
The CPR is a descriptive term referring to a massive monophyletic radiation of candidate phyla that exists within the Bacterial domain. It includes two main clades, the Microgenomates and Parcubacteria groups, each containing the eponymous superphyla and a few other phyla.

=== Patescibacteria ===
The superphylum Patescibacteria was originally proposed to encompass the phyla Microgenomates (OP11), Parcubacteria (OD1), and Gracilibacteria (GNO2 / BD1-5). More recent phylogenetic analyses show that the last common ancestor of these taxa is the same node as that of CPR.

=== Sphingobacteria ===
The Sphingobacteria (FCB group) includes Bacteroidota, Calditrichota, Chlorobiota, candidate phylum "Cloacimonetes", Fibrobacterota, Gemmatimonadota, Ignavibacteriota, candidate phylum "Latescibacteria", candidate phylum "Marinimicrobia", and candidate phylum "Zixibacteria".

=== Microgenomates ===
Microgenomates was originally thought to be a single phylum although evidence suggests it actually encompasses over 11 bacterial phyla, including Curtisbacteria, Daviesbacteria, Levybacteria, Gottesmanbacteria, Woesebacteria, Amesbacteria, Shapirobacteria, Roizmanbacteria, Beckwithbacteria, Collierbacteria, Pacebacteria.

=== Parcubacteria ===
Parcubacteria was originally described as a single phylum using fewer than 100 16S rRNA sequences. With a greater diversity of 16S rRNA sequences from uncultured organisms now available, it is estimated it may consist of up to 28 bacterial phyla. In line with this, over 14 phyla have now been described within the Parcubacteria group, including Kaiserbacteria, Adlerbacteria, Campbellbacteria, Nomurabacteria, Giovannonibacteria, Wolfebacteria, Jorgensenbacteria, Yanofskybacteria, Azambacteria, Moranbacteria, Uhrbacteria, and Magasanikbacteria.

=== Proteobacteria ===
It has been proposed that some classes of the phylum Proteobacteria may be phyla in their own right, which would make Proteobacteria a superphylum. For example, the Deltaproteobacteria group does not consistently form a monophyletic lineage with the other Proteobacteria classes.

=== Planctobacteria ===
The Planctobacteria (PVC group) includes Chlamydiota, Lentisphaerota, candidate phylum "Omnitrophica", Planctomycetota, candidate phylum "Poribacteria", and Verrucomicrobiota.

=== Bacillati ===
The kingdom Bacillati, includes Actinomycetota, "Cyanobacteria/Melainabacteria clade", Deinococcota, Chloroflexota, Bacillota, and candidate phylum OP10.

=== Cryptic superphyla ===
Several candidate phyla (Microgenomates, Omnitrophica, Parcubacteria, and Saccharibacteria) and several accepted phyla (Elusimicrobiota, Caldisericota, and Armatimonadota) have been suggested to actually be superphyla that were incorrectly described as phyla because rules for defining a bacterial phylum are lacking or due to a lack of sequence diversity in databases when the phylum was first established. For example, it is suggested that candidate phylum Parcubacteria is actually a superphylum that encompasses 28 subordinate phyla and that phylum Elusimicrobia is actually a superphylum that encompasses 7 subordinate phyla.

== Historical perspective ==
Atomic structure of the 30S ribosomal Subunit from Thermus thermophilus of which 16S makes up a part. Proteins are shown in blue and the single RNA strand in tan.

Given the rich history of the field of bacterial taxonomy and the rapidity of changes therein in modern times, it is often useful to have a historical perspective on how the field has progressed in order to understand references to antiquated definitions or concepts.

When bacterial nomenclature was controlled under the Botanical Code, the term division was used, but now that bacterial nomenclature (with the exception of cyanobacteria) is controlled under the Bacteriological Code, the term phylum is preferred.

In 1987, Carl Woese, regarded as the forerunner of the molecular phylogeny revolution, divided Eubacteria into 10 phyla based on 16S ribosomal RNA (SSU) sequences, listed below. In addition two genera were unassignd to a phylum.

- Purple Bacteria and their relatives (later renamed Proteobacteria)
  - alpha subdivision (purple non-sulfur bacteria, rhizobacteria, Agrobacterium, Rickettsiae, Nitrobacter)
  - beta subdivision (Rhodocyclus, (some) Thiobacillus, Alcaligenes, Spirillum, Nitrosovibrio)
  - gamma subdivision (enterics, fluorescent pseudomonads, purple sulfur bacteria, Legionella, (some) Beggiatoa)
  - delta subdivision (Sulfur and sulfate reducers (Desulfovibrio), Myxobacteria, Bdellovibrio)
- Gram-positive Eubacteria (Note: Until recently, it was believed than only Bacillota and Actinomycetota were Gram-positive. However, the candidate phylum TM7 may also be Gram positive. Chloroflexi however possess a single bilayer, but stain negative (with some exceptions).)
  - High-G+C species (later renamed Actinobacteria) (Actinomyces, Streptomyces, Arthrobacter, Micrococcus, Bifidobacterium)
  - Low-G+C species (later renamed Firmicutes) (Clostridium, Peptococcus, Bacillus, Mycoplasma)
  - Photosynthetic species (Heliobacteria)
  - Species with Gram-negative walls (Megasphaera, Sporomusa)
- Cyanobacteria and chloroplasts (Aphanocapsa, Oscillatoria, Nostoc, Synechococcus, Gloeobacter, Prochloron)
- Spirochetes and relatives
  - Spirochetes (Spirochaeta, Treponema, Borrelia)
  - Leptospiras (Leptospira, Leptonema)
- Green sulfur bacteria (Chlorobium, Chloroherpeton)
- Bacteroides, Flavobacteria and relatives (later renamed Bacteroidetes
  - Bacteroides (Bacteroides, Fusobacterium)
  - Flavobacterium group (Flavobacterium, Cytophaga, Saprospira, Flexibacter)
- Planctomyces and relatives (later renamed Planctomycetes)
  - Planctomyces group (Planctomyces, Pasteuria [sic] (Note: Pasteuria is now assigned to phylum Bacillota, not to phylum Planctomycetota.))
  - Thermophiles (Isocystis pallida)
- Chlamydiae (Chlamydia psittaci, Chlamydia trachomatis)
- Radioresistant micrococci and relatives (later renamed Deinococcus–Thermus or Thermi) (Note: It has been proposed to call the clade Xenobacteria or Hadobacteria (the latter is considered an illegitimate name).)
  - Deinococcus group (Deinococcus radiodurans)
  - Thermophiles (Thermus aquaticus)
- Green non-sulfur bacteria and relatives (later renamed Chloroflexi)
  - Chloroflexus group (Chloroflexus, Herpetosiphon)
  - Thermomicrobium group (Thermomicrobium roseum)
- Incertae sedis
  - Thermotoga maritima (later placed in Thermotogae)
  - Thermodesulfotobacterium commune (now Thermodesulfobacterium commune

Traditionally, phylogeny was inferred and taxonomy established based on studies of morphology. The advent of molecular phylogenetics has allowed for improved elucidation of the evolutionary relationship of species by analyzing their DNA and protein sequences, for example their ribosomal DNA. The lack of easily accessible morphological features, such as those present in animals and plants, hampered early efforts of classification and resulted in erroneous, distorted and confused classification, an example of which, noted Carl Woese, is Pseudomonas whose etymology ironically matched its taxonomy, namely "false unit". Many bacterial taxa were re-classified or re-defined using molecular phylogenetics.

The advent of molecular sequencing technologies has allowed for the recovery of genomes directly from environmental samples (i.e. bypassing culturing), leading to rapid expansion of our knowledge of the diversity of bacterial phyla. These techniques are genome-resolved metagenomics and single-cell genomics.

== See also ==
- Bacterial taxonomy#Phyla endings
- International Code of Nomenclature of Bacteria
- Branching order of bacterial phyla (Woese, 1987)
- Branching order of bacterial phyla (Gupta, 2001)
- Branching order of bacterial phyla (Cavalier-Smith, 2002)
- Branching order of bacterial phyla (Rappe and Giovanoni, 2003)
- Branching order of bacterial phyla (Battistuzzi et al., 2004)
- Branching order of bacterial phyla (Ciccarelli et al., 2006)
- Branching order of bacterial phyla after ARB Silva Living Tree
- Branching order of bacterial phyla (Genome Taxonomy Database, 2018)
- List of Bacteria genera
- List of bacterial orders
- List of sequenced bacterial genomes
