= List of bacterial orders =

This article lists the orders of the Bacteria. The currently accepted taxonomy is based on the List of Prokaryotic names with Standing in Nomenclature (LPSN) and National Center for Biotechnology Information (NCBI) and the phylogeny is based on 16S rRNA-based LTP release 132 by The All-Species Living Tree Project.

== Phylogeny ==
National Center for Biotechnology Information (NCBI) taxonomy was initially used to decorate the genome tree via tax2tree. The 16S rRNA-based Greengenes taxonomy is used to supplement the taxonomy particularly in regions of the tree with no cultured representatives. List of Prokaryotic names with Standing in Nomenclature (LPSN) is used as the primary taxonomic authority for establishing naming priorities. Taxonomic ranks are normalised using phylorank and the taxonomy manually curated to remove polyphyletic groups.

Cladogram was taken from GTDB release 11-RS232 (15th April 2026).

- Bacteria
  - - Bacillati
      - - - "Sysuimicrobiota"
          - Deinococcota
        - - Chloroflexota
          - Minisyncoccota
      - - - Armatimonadota
          - Vulcanimicrobiota
        - - Actinomycetota
          - Bacillota
  - - - Thermotogati
        - - - "Xuanmingibacterota"
            - - "Yinglongibacterota"
              - "Gonggongibacterota"
          - - - Dictyoglomerota
              - Thermodesulfobiota
            - - Coprothermobacterota
              - Caldisericota
        - - Synergistota
          - - "Bipolaricaulota"
            - Thermotogota
    - - - - - Fusobacteriati
              Fusobacteriota
          - Mycoplasmatota
        - - "Cyanoprokaryota"
            - "Margulisbacteria"
            - Cyanobacteriota
      - - Pseudomonadati
          - "Muiribacteriota"
          - - - - "Macinerneyibacteriota"
                - "Sumerlaeota"
              - - - "Lindowbacteria"
                  - "Salsurabacteriota" [DAL-3Gt_29_1_96C5R]
                - Spirochaetota
            - - - - - "Poribacteriota"
                    - "Oederibacteriota"
                  - - - - "Aerophobota"
                        - Atribacterota
                      - - "Desantisiibacteriota"
                        - - - "Ryujiniota"
                            - "Shingomicrobia"
                          - Elusimicrobiota
                    - - - "Ratteibacteriota"
                        - JAHJDO01
                      - "Omnitrophota"
                - - "Planctochlora"
                    - - "Planctobacteria"
                        - - "Abyssobacterota"
                          - "Hydrogenedentota"
                        - - Planctomycetota
                          - - "Auribacterota"
                            - - Chlamydiota
                              - Verrucomicrobiota
                    - - "FCB group"
                        ⊞
                        ⊟
                        - - "Hinthialibacterota" (OLB16)
                          - "Tangaroaeota" (RBG-13-66-14; Coatesbacteria)
                        - - - - - "Edwardsiibacteriota"
                                - Caldifarciminota
                              - - "Fermentibacterota"
                                - "Cloacimonadota"
                            - - - - "Arandabacterota"
                                  - "Orphanbacterota"
                                - - "Eiseniibacteriota"
                                  - - "Joyebacterota"
                                    - "Krumholzibacteriota"
                              - - Gemmatimonadota
                                - - "Latescibacterota"
                                  - - "Blakebacterota"
                                    - - "Zixiibacteriota"
                                      - - - "Delongiibacteriota" (UBA4055)
                                          - Fibrobacterota
                                        - - "Electryoneota" (AABM5-125-24)
                                          - - Fidelibacterota
                                            - - "Zhuqueibacterota"
                                              - - Calditrichota
                                                - Bacteroidota
              - - "Proteobacteria
                  ⊞
                  ⊟
                  - Acidobacteriota
                  - - - - "Aquificida"
                          - "Acidulodesulfobacteriota" (sic) (SZUA-79)
                          - - - Calescibacterota
                              - "Dadaibacteriota" (Desulfobacterota_D)
                            - - Desulfurellia {Campylobacterota_A}
                              - - Thermosulfidibacterota
                                - Aquificota
                      - - - - "Lernaellota" (FEN-1099)
                            - Myxococcota
                          - - Bdellovibrionota
                            - - - "Lambdaproteobacteria" {SAR324}
                                - "Oligoflexaeota"
                              - Myxococcota_A
                        - - - - - "Moduliflexota"
                                - "Methylomirabilota"
                              - - "Schekmaniibacteriota"
                                - - - "Spongiamicota"
                                    - "Tectimicrobiota"
                                  - Nitrospinota
                            - Nitrospirota
                          - Thermodesulfobacteriota
                    - - "Babelota"
                      - - - Chrysiogenota
                          - Campylobacterota
                        - Pseudomonadota (s.s.)

== Kingdom Bacillati ==
=== Phylum "Sysuimicrobiota" ===
- Class "Sysuimicrobiia" Liu et al. 2024 [CSP1-3]
  - "Sysuimicrobiales" Liu et al. 2024

=== Phylum Deinococcota ===
- "Deinococcia" Cavalier-Smith 2020
  - Deinococcales Rainey et al. 1997 (Thermales; Trueperales) (radio-resistant micrococci)

=== Phylum Chloroflexota ===
Phylogeny of Chloroflexota

- - - "Dormibacteria"
      - "Aeolococcales"
      - "Dormibacterales"
  - - - "Limnocylindria"
        "Limnocylindrales"
    - - - Ktedonobacteria
          Ktedonobacterales
      - - - "Chloroflexotia" Chloroflexia
            - - "Chloroheliales"
              - - "Thermobaculales"
                - Thermomicrobiales
            - Chloroflexales
        - - "Dehalococcoidotia" Dehalococcoidia
            - Tepidiformales
            - - "Lucifugimonadales"
              - Dehalococcoidales
          - "Caldilineotia" "Caldilineia"
            - - Ardenticatenales
              - "Epilineales"
            - - "Caldilineidae"
                - "Ca. Amarolinea" {SSC4}
                - Caldilineales
              - "Anaerolineidae"
                - Thermoflexales
                - - "Roseilineaceae" {J036}
                  - - "Promineofilales"
                    - - Aggregatilineales
                      - Anaerolineales

- Class "Bathosphaeria" Mehrshad et al. 2018
  - ?"Bathosphaerales" Mehrshad et al. 2018 [JG30-KF-CM66]
- Class "Martimicrobia" Williams et al. 2024
  - ?"Martimicrobiales" Williams et al. 2024
- Class "Poriflexia" Kogawa et al. 2022
  - ?"Ca. Poriflexus" Kogawa et al. 2022
- Class "Spiritibacteria" Williams et al. 2024
  - ?"Spiritibacterales" Williams et al. 2024
- Class "Tarhunnaeia" Williams et al. 2024
  - ?"Tarhunnaeales" Williams et al. 2024
- Class "Uliximicrobia" Williams et al. 2024
  - ?"Uliximicrobiales" Williams et al. 2024
- Class "Umbricyclopia" Mehrshad et al. 2018
  - ?"Umbricyclopales" Mehrshad et al. 2018 (TK10)
- Class "Dormiibacteria" (sic) Montgomery et al. 2021 (AD3)
  - "Aeolococcales" Montgomery et al. 2021
  - "Dormibacterales" (sic) Montgomery et al. 2021
- Class "Limnocylindria" Mehrshad et al. 2018
  - "Limnocylindrales" Mehrshad et al. 2018 ["Edaphomicrobiales"] (SL56)
- Class Ktedobacteria corrig. Cavaletti et al. 2007
  - Ktedonobacterales corrig. Cavaletti et al. 2007 [Thermogemmatisporales]
- Class Chloroflexia Gupta et al. 2013
  - Chloroflexales Gupta et al. 2013 (Herpetosiphonales, Kallotenuales)
  - "Chloroheliales" Tsuji et al. 2024
  - "Thermobaculales" Chuvochina et al. 2023
  - Thermomicrobiales Garrity & Holt 2002 (Sphaerobacterales)
- Class Dehalococcoidia Löffler et al. 2013
  - Dehalococcoidales Löffler et al. 2013
  - "Lucifugimonadales" Lim et al. 2023 ["Monstramariales"; "Australimonadales"]
  - Tepidiformales Kochetkova et al. 2020
- Class "Caldilineia" Oren, Parte & Garrity 2016 ex Cavalier-Smith 2020
  - Aggregatilineales Nakahara et al. 2019 ["Phototrophicales"]
  - "Amarolineaceae" Andersen et al. 2019 {SSC4}
  - Anaerolineales Yamada et al. 2006
  - Ardenticatenales Kawaichi et al. 2013
  - Caldilineales Yamada et al. 2006
  - "Epilineales" Petriglieri et al. 2023
  - "Roseilineaceae" Ward et al. 2021 {J036}
  - "Promineifilales" corrig. Chuvochina et al. 2023
  - Thermoflexales Dodsworth et al. 2014

=== Phylum "Elulimicrobiota" ===
- Class "Elulimicrobiia" Rodriguez-R et al. 2020
  - ?"Elulimicrobiales" Rodriguez-R et al. 2020

=== Phylum Minisyncoccota ===
Phylogeny of Minisyncoccota

- - - "Wirthbacteria"
    - - "Microgenomates" cluster
        - "Dojkabacteria"
        - - "Katanobacteria"
          - - "Microgenomatia"
              ⊞
              ⊟
              - "Woykebacterales"
              - - - "Curtissbacterales"
                  - "Daviesbacterales"
                - - - "Roizmanbacterales"
                    - - "Gottesmanbacterales"
                      - "Levybacterales"
                  - - "Chazhemtobacteriales"
                    - - "Shapirobacterales"
                      - - CAZETR01
                        - UBA8517
  - - - "Gracilibacteria" cluster
        - "Gracilibacteria"
          ⊞
          ⊟
          - "Abawacaibacteriales"
          - - - "Fallacibacteriales"
              - - "Peregrinibacterales"
                - "Peribacterales"
            - - BD1-5
              - "Abawacabacterales"
    - - "Saccharibacteria" cluster
        - "Nanosomnibacteria"
        - - "Kazanbacteria"
          - - "Howlettbacteria"
            - - Nanosynbacteria
                ⊞
                ⊟
                - "Parviradicicolales"
                - Nanosynbacterales
      - "Parcubacteria" cluster
        - - "Doudnabacteria"
          - - "Patescibacteriia"
              ⊞
              ⊟
              - "Kerfeldbacterales"
              - - - "Kuenenbacterales"
                  - - "Komeilibacterales"
                    - "Veblenbacterales"
                - - "Jacksonbacterales"
                  - - "Moisslbacterales"
                    - - - "Buchananbacterales"
                        - - "Magasanikbacterales"
                          - "Uhrbacterales"
                      - "Patescibacteriales"
        - - "Torokbacteria"
          - - "Andersenbacteria"
            - - Minisyncoccia
                ⊞
                ⊟
                - "Moranbacterales"
                - - "Portnoybacterales"
                  - - Minisyncoccales
                    - - - "Azambacterales"
                        - "Parcunitrobacterales"
                      - - - "Spechtbacterales"
                          - "Terrybacterales"
                        - - - UBA6257
                            - "Yanofskybacterales"
                          - - "Sungbacterales"
                            - - "Ryanbacterales"
                              - - - "Giovannonibacteraceae"
                                  - "Niyogibacteraceae"
                                - - "Tagabacteraceae"
                                  - "Phycocordibacterales"

- Class "Wirthbacteria" (CG2-30-54-11)
- Class "Dojkabacteria" (WS6)
- Class "Katanobacteria" (WWE3)
- Class "Microgenomatia"
  - "Amesbacteraceae" {CAZETR01}
  - "Chazhemtobacteriales" Pallen, Rodriguez-R & Alikhan 2022 [UBA1400]
  - "Curtissbacterales"
  - "Daviesbacterales"
  - "Gottesmanbacterales" (UBA10105)
  - "Levybacterales"
  - "Roizmanbacterales" (UBA1406)
  - "Shapirobacterales" (UBA12405)
  - "Woykebacterales" (RIF34)
  - UBA8517 [incl. "Blackburnbacteraceae"; "Woesebacteraceae"]
- Class "Gracilibacteria" Yakimov et al. 2022
  - "Absconditabacterales" (sic) Yakimov et al. 2022 ["Vampirococcales"]
  - "Abawacabacterales" (RBG-16-42-10; RIF46)
  - "Candidatus Altimarinus" Rinke et al. 2013 {BD1-5: UBA6164} (GN02)
  - "Fallacibacteriales" (DOLZORAL124_38_8; UBA4473; "Fertabacterales")
  - "Peregrinibacterales" (UBA1369)
  - "Peribacterales" Anantharaman et al. 2016
- Class "Kazanbacteria" (Kazan)
- Class "Howlettbacteria" (CPR2)
- Class "Nanosomnibacteria" Tan et al. 2026 ["Berkelbacteria" (sic)] (ACD58)
  - "Nanosomnibacterales" Tan et al. 2026
- Class Nanosynbacteria Hendrickson et al. 2026 (TM7)
  - Nanosynbacterales Hendrickson et al. 2026 ["Nanosyncoccales"; "Nanogingivalales"; "Nanoperiodontomorbales"; "Saccharimonadales"]
  - "Parviradicicolales" Wang et al. 2026 (QS-5-54-17)
- Class ?"Baikalibacteria" Haro-Moreno et al. 2023
- Class "Andersenbacteria" (RIF9)
- Class "Doudnabacteria" (SM2F11)
- Class "Torokbacteria" (GCA-2792135)
- Class "Patescibacteriia" Dutkiewicz et al. 2025 (ABY1)
  - ?"Brownbacterales"
  - "Buchananbacterales" (sic) (RIF37)
  - "Jacksonbacterales" (sic) (UBA9629) (RIF38; UBA9629)
  - "Kerfeldbacterales" (sic) (RIF4; SBBC01)
  - "Komeilibacterales" (sic) (RIF6; UBA1558)
  - "Kuenenbacterales" (sic) (UBA2196)
  - "Magasanikbacterales"
  - "Moisslbacterales" [UBA2591]
  - "Patescibacteriales" Dutkiewicz et al. 2025 ["Falkowbacterales"]
  - "Uhrbacterales" (SG8-24)
  - "Veblenbacterales" (RIF39)
- Class Minisyncoccia Nakajima et al. 2025
  - "Azambacterales" (sic) (UBA10092)
  - "Giovannonibacteraceae" (sic) {UBA11713}
  - ?"Montesolbacterales"
  - "Moranbacterales" (OD1-i)
  - "Niyogibacteraceae" {HO2-45-28} (RIF11)
  - Minisyncoccales Nakajima et al. 2025 ["Paceibacterales" Chuvochina et al. 2023]
  - "Parcunitrobacterales" Castelle et al. 2017 (GWA2-38-13b)
  - "Phycocordibacterales" Jonas et al. 2025
  - "Portnoybacterales" (RIF22)
  - "Ryanbacterales" (RIF10)
  - "Spechtbacterales" (RIF19)
  - "Sungbacterales" (RIF17)
  - "Tagabacteraceae" {JAHISW01} (RIF12)
  - "Terrybacteraceae" (RIF13)
  - UBA6257
  - "Yanofskybacterales" (sic) (2-02-FULL-40-12)

=== Phylum Armatimonadota ===
Phylogeny of Armatimonadota

- - - - Fimbriimonadia
        Fimbriimonadales
    - - Chthonomonadetes
        Chthonomonadales
      - Armatimonadia
        Armatimonadales
  - - - "Heboniibacteriia"
        "Heboniibacterales"
    - - - "Zipacnadia"
          "Zipacnadales"
      - - Abditibacteriia
          Abditibacteriales
        - Fervidibacteria
          Fervidibacterales

- Class UBA5829
  - ?"Candidatus Hippobium" Gilroy et al. 2022 {UBA5829: UBA5829}
- Class Fimbriimonadia Im et al. 2012
  - Fimbriimonadales Im et al. 2012
- Class Chthonomonadia Oren, Parte & Garrity 2016
  - Chthonomonadales Lee et al. 2011
- Class Armatimonadia Tamaki et al. 2011 (OP10)
  - Armatimonadales Tamaki et al. 2011
- Class "Heboniibacteriia" corrig. Carlton et al. 2023
  - "Heboniibacterales" corrig. Carlton et al. 2023
- Class "Zipacnadia" Carlton et al. 2023 (UBA5377)
  - "Zipacnadales" Carlton et al. 2023
- Class Abditibacteriia Tahon et al. 2018 (FBP)
  - Abditibacteriales Tahon et al. 2018
- Class Fervidibacteria Nou et al. 2025
  - Fervidibacterales Nou et al. 2025

=== Phylum Vulcanimicrobiota ===
Phylogeny of Vulcanimicrobiota

- - "Xenobia"
    "Xenobiales"
  - Vulcanimicrobiia
    - "Eremiobacterales"
    - Vulcanimicrobiales

- Class "Eudoremicrobiia" (sic) Paoli et al. 2022
  - ?"Eudoremicrobiales" (sic) Paoli et al. 2022
- Class "Xenobia" Ji et al. 2021 (UBP9)
  - "Xenobiales" Ji et al. 2021
- Class Vulcanimicrobiia Yabe et al. 2024 (WPS2)
  - "Eremiobacterales" Ward, Cardona & Holland-Moritz 2019
  - Vulcanimicrobiales Yabe et al. 2024 ("Baltobacterales"; "Palusbacterales"; "Rubrimentiphilales")

=== Phylum Actinomycetota ===
Phylogeny of Actinomycetota

- - - "Aquicultoria"
      - "Geothermocultorales"
      - - "Aquicultorales"
        - - "Oleimmundimicrobiales"
          - "Subteraquimicrobiales"
    - Coriobacteriia
      - Anaerosomatales
      - Coriobacteriales
  - - - "Geothermincolia"
        - "Geohydrothermomicrobiales"
        - "Geothermincolales"
    - - - - "Humimicrobiia"
            - "Hakubellales"
            - "Humimicrobiales"
        - - Rubrobacteria
            Rubrobacterales
          - Thermoleophilia
            - - Gaiellales
              - Miltoncostaeales
            - Thermoleophilales
      - - - Acidimicrobiia
            - - "Actinomarinales"
              - "Spongiisociales"
            - Acidimicrobiales
        - - - "Aridivitia"
              - "Bungeriellales"
              - "Aridivitales"
          - - - "Gisumiia"
                "Actinosomnolentales"
            - - Nitriliruptoria
                - Euzebyales
                - Nitriliruptorales
              - Actinomycetia
                - Frankiales
                - - Mycobacteriales
                  - - Streptosporangiales
                    - - - Sporichthyales
                        - Streptomycetales
                      - - Acidothermales
                        - - - S36-B12
                            - "Nanopelagicales"
                          - - "Hydrogenolapales"
                            - - Motilibacterales
                              - - - Jiangellales
                                  - Propionibacteriales
                                - Actinomycetales

- Class ?"Syntrophaliphaticia" corrig. Liu et al. 2020
- Class "Aquicultoria" Jiao et al. 2021
  - "Aquicultorales" Jiao et al. 2021
  - "Geothermocultorales" Jiao et al. 2021
  - "Oleimmundimicrobiales" Pallen, Rodriguez-R & Alikhan 2022
  - "Subteraquimicrobiales" Jiao et al. 2021
- Class Coriobacteriia König 2013
  - Anaerosomatales Khomyakova et al. 2023
  - Coriobacteriales Stackebrandt et al. 1997 (Eggerthellales)
- Class "Geothermincolia" Jiao et al. 2021
  - "Geohydrothermomicrobiales" Pallen, Rodriguez-R & Alikhan 2022 [Fen-727]
  - "Geothermincolales" Jiao et al. 2021
- Class "Humimicrobiia" Jiao et al. 2021
  - "Hakubellales" corrig. Merino et al. 2020
  - "Humimicrobiales" Jiao et al. 2021
- Class Rubrobacteria Suzuki 2013
  - Rubrobacterales Rainey et al. 1997
- Class Thermoleophilia Suzuki & Whitman 2013
  - Gaiellales Albuquerque et al. 2012
  - Miltoncostaeales Li et al. 2021
  - Thermoleophilales Reddy & Garcia-Pichel 2009 (Solirubrobacterales)
- Class Acidimicrobiia Norris 2013
  - Acidimicrobiales Stackebrandt, Rainey & Ward-Rainey 1997 (Iamiales)
  - "Actinomarinales" Ghai et al. 2013
  - "Spongiisociales" corrig. Nguyen 2022 ("Benthobacterales")
- Class "Aridivitia" Ortiz et al. 2021 [CADDZG01]
  - "Aridivitales" Ortiz et al. 2021 [CADDZG01]
  - "Bungeriellales" Tan et al. 2026 [JAHWKV01]
- Class "Gisumiia" Pallen, Rodriguez-R & Alikhan 2022 [UBA4738]
  - "Actinosomnolentales" Tan et al. 2026 [UBA4738]
- Class Nitriliruptoria Ludwig et al. 2013
  - Euzebyales Kurahashi et al. 2010 (Egibacterales,Stomatohabitantales)
  - Nitriliruptorales Sorokin et al. 2009 (Egicoccales, Salsipaludibacterales)
- Class Actinomycetia Salam et al. 2020
  - Acidothermales Sen et al. 2014
  - Actinomycetales Buchanan 1917 (Aquipuribacterales; Beutenbergiales; Bifidobacteriales; Bogoriellales; Brevibacteriales; Cellulomonadales; Demequinales; Dermabacterales; Dermatophilales; Microbacteriales; Micrococcales; Kineosporiales; Ruaniales)
  - Frankiales Sen et al. 2014
  - "Hydrogenolapales" Bay et al. 2025 [JACCUZ01]
  - Jiangellales Tang et al. 2015
  - Longivirga Qu et al. 2018 {S36-B12: CAIYMF01}
  - Motilibacterales Salam et al. 2020
  - Mycobacteriales Janke 1924 (Corynebacteriales; Actinocatenisporales; Actinoplanetales; Actinopolysporales; Antricoccales; Cryptosporangiales; Geodermatophilales; Glycomycetales; Jatrophihabitantales; Micromonosporales; Nakamurellales; Phytomonosporales; Pseudonocardiales)
  - "Nanopelagicales" Neuenschwander et al. 2018
  - Propionibacteriales Patrick & McDowell 2015
  - Sporichthyales Nouioui et al. 2018
  - Streptomycetales Kampfer 2015 (Catenulisporales, Kitasatosporales)
  - Streptosporangiales Goodfellow 2015

=== Phylum Bacillota ===
Phylogeny of Bacillota s.l.

- - "Halanaerobiota" (Bacillota_F)
  - - Bacillota_G
    - - - "Selenobacteria" (Bacillota_C)
        - "Desulfotomaculota" (Bacillota_B)
      - - "Clostridiota" (Bacillota_A)
        - - Bacillota_E
          - - Bacillota_D
            - "Bacillia" {Bacillota s.s.}

- Class Thermolithobacteria Sokolova et al. 2007
  - ?Thermolithobacterales Sokolova et al. 2007

Phylogeny of "Halanaerobiota"

- "Halanaerobiia"
  - "Anoxybacterales"
  - - Halanaerobiales
    - Halobacteroidales

- Clade "Halanaerobiota" corrig. Alsufyani 2018 (Bacillota_F)
  - Class "Halanaerobiia" Cavalier-Smith 2020
    - "Anoxybacterales" Pallen, Rodriguez-R & Alikhan 2022 {DY22613}
    - Halanaerobiales corrig. Rainey & Zhilina 1995
    - Halobacteroidales Chuvochina et al. 2024

Phylogeny of Bacillota_G

- - "Hydrogenisporia"
    - "Capillibacteriales"
    - "Hydrogenisporales"
  - Limnochordia
    - Limnochordales
    - "Darwinibacterales"

- Clade Bacillota_G
  - Class "Hydrogenisporia" Pallen, Rodriguez-R & Alikhan 2022
    - "Capillibacteriales" Pallen, Rodriguez-R & Alikhan 2022 [UBA10575]
    - "Hydrogenisporales" Pallen, Rodriguez-R & Alikhan 2022 [UBA8346]
  - Class Limnochordia Watanabe, Kojima & Fukui 2015
    - Limnochordales Watanabe, Kojima & Fukui 2015
    - "Darwinibacterales" corrig. Puchol-Royo et al. 2023

Phylogeny of "Selenobacteria"

- "Selenomonadia"
  - - Acidaminococcales
    - Veillonellales
  - - - "Sporomusales"
      - - - UMGS1260
          - Anaeromusales
        - - DSM-13327
          - Propionisporales
    - - SG130
      - - "Dendrosporobacterales"
        - - ICN-92133
          - - FLKF01
            - Selenomonadales

- Clade "Selenobacteria" Cavalier-Smith 1992
  - Class "Selenomonadia" Oren, Parte & Garrity 2016
    - Acidaminococcales Campbell, Adeolu & Gupta 2015
    - Anaeromusales Chuvochina et al. 2024
    - Anaerosinus Strompl et al. 1999 {ICN-92133: ICN-92133}
    - "Azotosporobacter" Xie et al. 2024 {SG130: SG130}
    - "Dendrosporobacterales" Pallen, Rodriguez-R & Alikhan 2022
    - "Massilibacillaceae" {FLKF01}
    - Pelorhabdus Grässle et al. 2022 {UMGS1260: UMGS1260}
    - "Pelosinaceae" {DSM-13327}
    - Propionisporales Chuvochina et al. 2024
    - Selenomonadales Marchandin et al. 2010
    - "Sporomusales" Cavalier-Smith 2006
    - Veillonellales Campbell, Adeolu & Gupta 2015

Phylogeny of "Desulfotomaculota"

- - - Peptococcia
      - "Thermanaerosceptrales"
      - Peptococcales
  - - - - Desulfitisporia
          Desulfitisporales
      - - - "Dehalobacteriia"
            - - "Avidehalobacterales"
              - "Cryptoclostridiales"
            - "Dehalobacteriales"
        - - - KKC1
              Calderihabitantales
            - JADQBR01
              JADQBR01
          - - - DSM‑16504
                Desulfitibacterales
            - - - DULZ01
                  DULZ01
              - - - "Moorellia"
                    Neomoorellales
                - - "Thermacetogeniia"
                    Thermacetogeniales
                  - Syntrophomonadia
                    Syntrophomonadales
    - - - Desulfitobacteriia
          - "Heliobacteriales"
          - Desulfitobacteriales
      - - - "Carboxydocellia"
            Carboxydocellales
          - Thermincolia
            Thermincolales
        - - "Carboxydothermia"
            Carboxydothermales
          - Desulfotomaculia
            Desulfotomaculales

- Clade "Desulfotomaculota" Watanabe, Fukui & Kuever 2019 (Bacillota_B)
  - Class Peptococcia Chuvochina et al. 2024
    - Peptococcales Chuvochina et al. 2024
    - "Thermanaerosceptrales" Pallen, Rodriguez-R & Alikhan 2022 [DRI-13]
  - Class Desulfitisporia Sorokin & Merkel 2023
    - Desulfitisporales Sorokin & Merkel 2023
  - Class "Dehalobacteriia"
    - "Avidehalobacterales" Pallen, Rodriguez-R & Alikhan 2022 [UBA4068]
    - "Cryptoclostridiales" Pallen, Rodriguez-R & Alikhan 2022 [UBA7702]
    - "Dehalobacteriales"
  - Class KKC1
    - Calderihabitantales Chuvochina et al. 2024
  - Class JADQBR01
    - "Metallumcola" Hsu et al. 2024 {JADQBR01: JADQBR01}
  - Class DSM-16504
    - Desulfitibacterales Chuvochina et al. 2024
  - Class DULZ01
    - Zhaonellaceae Lv et al. 2020 {DULZ01}
  - Class "Moorellia" Sorokin et al. 2020
    - Neomoorellales Gtari & Ventura 2025
  - Class "Thermacetogeniia" corrig. Voyron et al. 2022
    - Thermacetogeniales Chuvochina et al. 2024
  - Class Syntrophomonadia Chuvochina et al. 2024
    - Syntrophomonadales Chuvochina et al. 2024
  - Class Desulfitobacteriia Chuvochina et al. 2024
    - Desulfitobacteriales Chuvochina et al. 2024
    - "Heliobacteriales" Kinman 1994 ex Cavalier-Smith 2020
  - Class "Carboxydocellia" Pallen, Rodriguez-R & Alikhan 2022
    - "Carboxydocellales Chuvochina et al. 2024
  - Class Thermincolia Chuvochina et al. 2024
    - "Thermincolales Chuvochina et al. 2024
  - Class "Carboxydothermia" Pallen, Rodriguez-R & Alikhan 2022
    - Carboxydothermales Chuvochina et al. 2024
  - Class Desulfotomaculia Chuvochina et al. 2024
    - Desulfotomaculales Chuvochina et al. 2024 (Ammonificales)

Phylogeny of "Clostridiota"

- - - Thermosediminibacteria
      - Koleobacterales
      - Thermosediminibacterales
  - - "Thermoanaerobacteria"
      - Caldicellulosiruptorales
      - Thermoanaerobacterales
    - "Clostridiia"
      - - - Mahellales
          - Caldicoprobacterales
      - - Eubacteriales
        - - - - Lutisporales
              - - Tissierellales
                - Peptostreptococcales
          - - Clostridiales
            - - Christensenellales
              - - - - "Egerieisomatales"
                    - - "Saccharofermentanales"
                      - - "Merdicolales"
                        - - DSM-8532
                          - Acetivibrionales
                  - - - - - "Petroclostridiales"
                          - - Monoglobales
                            - UMGS1810
                        - "Avimonoglobales"
                      - "Oscillospirales"
                - Lachnospirales

- Clade "Clostridiota" Misery et al. 2025 (Bacillota_A)
  - Class Thermosediminibacteria Chuvochina et al. 2024
    - Koleobacterales Sakamoto et al. 2021
    - Thermosediminibacterales Zhang et al. 2019 ("Thermovenabulales")
  - Class "Thermoanaerobacteria" Sorokin et al. 2020
    - Caldicellulosiruptorales Chuvochina et al. 2024
    - Thermoanaerobacterales Wiegel 2010 ("Caldanaerobiales")
  - Class "Clostridiia" Oren, Parte & Garrity 2016
    - Acetivibrionales Chuvochina et al. 2024
    - "Avimonoglobales" Pallen, Rodriguez-R & Alikhan 2022 [UBA1381]
    - Caldicoprobacterales Chuvochina et al. 2024
    - Christensenellales Parks et al. 2018 ex Chuvochina et al. 2024 ("Borkfalkiales"; "Comantemales")
    - Clostridiales Prevot 1953 s.s. ("Plectridiales")
    - "Egerieisomatales" Pallen, Rodriguez-R & Alikhan 2022 [UBA1212]
    - Eubacteriales Buchanan 1917
    - Lachnospirales Chuvochina et al. 2024 ("Epulopisciales")
    - Lutisporales Chuvochina et al. 2024
    - Mahellales Chuvochina et al. 2024
    - "Merdicolales" Pallen, Rodriguez-R & Alikhan 2022 [TANB77]
    - Monoglobales Chuvochina et al. 2024
    - "Oscillospirales" Glendinning et al. 2020
    - "Petroclostridiales" Pallen, Rodriguez-R & Alikhan 2022 [SK-Y3]
    - Peptostreptococcales Chuvochina et al. 2024
    - "Qingrenia" Liu et al. 2021b {UMGS1810: UMGS1810}
    - "Saccharofermentanales" corrig. Parks et al. 2018
    - "Thermoclostridiaceae" Pallen, Rodriguez-R & Alikhan 2022 {DSM-8532}
    - Tissierellales Alauzet et al. 2020

Phylogeny of Bacillota_E

- - - Symbiobacteriia
      Symbiobacteriales
  - - - UBA3575
        "Ca. Acetocimmeria"
      - Thermaerobacteria
        Thermaerobacterales
    - - "Fermentithermobacillia"
        "Fermentithermobacillales"
      - Sulfobacillia
        Sulfobacillales

- Clade Bacillota_E
  - Class Sulfobacillia Chuvochina et al. 2024
    - "Candidatus Acetocimmeria" Smith et al. 2021 {UBA3575: UBA3575}
    - "Fermentithermobacillales" Kadnikov et al. 2023
    - Sulfobacillales Chuvochina et al. 2024
    - Symbiobacteriales Chuvochina et al. 2024
    - Thermaerobacterales Chuvochina et al. 2024

Phylogeny of Bacillota_D

- - - "Proteinivoracia"
      "Proteinivoracales"
  - - "Dethiobacteria
      - SKNC01
      - Dehiobacterales
    - Natranaerobiia
      Natranaerobiales

- Clade Bacillota_D
  - Class "Proteinivoracia"
    - "Proteinivoracales"
  - Class Dethiobacteria Sorokin & Merkel 2025
    - "Candidatus Contubernalis" corrig. Zhilina et al. 2005 {SKNC01: SKNC01}
    - Dethiobacterales Sorokin & Merkel 2025
  - Class Natranaerobiia Chuvochina et al. 2024
    - Natranaerobiales Mesbah et al. 2007

Phylogeny of Bacillota s.s.

- "Bacillia"
  - - Kyrpidiales
    - - Tumebacillales
      - Alicyclobacillales
  - - Desulfuribacillales
    - - Thermoactinomycetales
      - - - - DSM-22679
            - Calditerricolales
          - - Aneurinibacillales
            - Brevibacillales
        - - - Bacillales F
            - Tepidibacillales
          - - Paenibacillales
            - - - "Rubeoparvulales"
                - Thermicanales
              - - Caldalkalibacillales
                - - Exiguobacteriales
                  - - "Harrysmithimonadales"
                    - - Bacillales
                      - - Caryophanales
                        - - Staphylococcales
                          - Lactobacillales

- Clade Bacillota s.s.
  - Class "Bacillia" Cavalier-Smith 2020
    - Alicyclobacillales Chuvochina et al. 2024
    - Aneurinibacillales Chuvochina et al. 2024
    - Aureibacillaceae Li et al. 2024 {DSM-28697}
    - Bacillales Prevot 1953 s.s. ("Caldibacillales")
    - "Bacillus thermozeamaize" Mak 2003 {Bacillales_F: Bacillaceae_M}
    - Brevibacillales Chuvochina et al. 2024
    - Caldalkalibacillales Chuvochina et al. 2024
    - Calditerricolales Chuvochina et al. 2024
    - Desulfuribacillales Sorokin et al. 2021
    - Exiguobacteriales Chuvochina et al. 2024
    - "Harrysmithimonadales" Pallen, Rodriguez-R & Alikhan 2022 [CAJFEE01]
    - Kyrpidiales Chuvochina et al. 2024
    - Lactobacillales Ludwig, Schleifer & Whitman 2010 ("Plocamobacteriales"; "Coccales")
    - Microaerobacter Khelifi et al. 2011 {DSM-22679: DSM-22679}
    - Paenibacillales Chuvochina et al. 2024
    - Caryophanales Peshkoff 1939
    - "Rubeoparvulales"
    - Staphylococcales Chuvochina et al. 2024
    - Tepidibacillales Chuvochina et al. 2024
    - Thermicanales Chuvochina et al. 2024 ["Brockiales"]
    - Thermoactinomycetales Chuvochina et al. 2024 ["Pasteuriales"]
    - Tumebacillales Chuvochina et al. 2024

== Kingdom Thermotogati ==
=== Phylum "Xuanmingibacterota" ===
- Class "Xuanmingibacterales" Zhang et al. 2026 [UBA6099]
  - "Xuanmingibacterales" Zhang et al. 2026 [UBA6099]

=== Phylum "Yinglongibacteria" ===
- Class "Yinglongibacterales" Zhang et al. 2026
  - "Yinglongibacterales" Zhang et al. 2026 [UBP7]

=== Phylum "Gonggongibacterota" ===
Phylogeny of Gonggongibacterota

- "Gonggongibacteria"
  - "Gonggongibacterales"
  - "Hydrothermincolales"

- Class "Gonggongibacteria" Zhang et al. 2026 [4484-113]
  - "Gonggongibacterales" Zhang et al. 2026 [4484-113]
  - "Hydrothermincolales" Zhang et al. 2026 [JAGGVC01]

=== Phylum Dictyoglomerota ===
- Class Dictyoglomeria corrig. Patel 2012
  - Dictyoglomerales corrig. Patel 2012

=== Phylum Thermodesulfobiota ===
- Class Thermodesulfobiia Frolov et al. 2023
  - Thermodesulfobiales Cavalier-Smith 2023

=== Phylum Coprothermobacterota ===
Phylogeny of Coprothermobacterota

- - Coprothermobacteria
    Coprothermobacterales
  - HKB111
    HKB111

- Class Coprothermobacteria Pavan et al. 2018
  - Coprothermobacterales Pavan et al. 2018
- Class HKB111
  - "Candidatus Lithacetigena" Nobu et al. 2022 {HKB111: HKB111}

=== Phylum Caldisericota ===
Phylogeny of Caldisericota

- Caldisericia
  - Caldisericales
  - "Cryosericales"

- Class Caldisericia Mori et al. 2009 (OP5)
  - Caldisericales Mori et al. 2009
  - "Cryosericales" Martinez et al. 2019

=== Phylum Synergistota ===
- Class Synergistia Jumas-Bilak et al. 2009
  - Synergistales Jumas-Bilak et al. 2009

=== Phylum "Bipolaricaulota" ===
Phylogeny of Bipolaricaulota

- "Bipolaricaulia"
  - "Bipolaricaulales"
  - "Fraserbacterales"

- Class "Bipolaricaulia" Chuvochina et al. 2023
  - "Bipolaricaulales" Chuvochina et al. 2023 (KB1 group, OP1)
  - "Fraserbacterales" [GTDB tag: RIF31; RBG-16-55-9]

=== Phylum Thermotogota ===
Phylogeny of Thermotogota

- "Thermotogia"
  - Mesoaciditogales
  - - Petrotogales
    - Thermotogales

- Class "Thermotogia" Oren, Parte & Garrity 2016 ex Cavalier-Smith 2020
  - Mesoaciditogales Itoh et al. 2016
  - Petrotogales Bhandari & Gupta 2014 (Kosmotogales)
  - Thermotogales Reysenbach 2002 emend. Bhandari & Gupta 2014

== Kingdom Fusobacteriati ==
=== Phylum Fusobacteriota ===
- Class Fusobacteriia corrig. Staley & Whitman 2012
  - Fusobacterales Staley & Whitman 2012 ("Bactepneumoniales"; "Propionigeniales")

== Phylum Mycoplasmatota ==
Phylogeny of Margulisiibacteriota

- - "Aphodocolales"
  - - - Culicoidibacterales
      - - - Haloplasmatales
          - MOL361
        - - "Bathyoplasmales"
          - - "Izemoplasmatales"
            - Acholeplasmatales
    - - - "Caccosomales"
        - Erysipelotrichales
      - Mycoplasmatales

- Class Erysipelotrichia Ludwig, Schleifer & Whitman 2010 (Bacillota_I)
  - Acholeplasmatales Freundt et al. 1984 (Anaeroplasmatales)
  - "Aphodocolales" Pallen, Rodriguez-R & Alikhan 2022 [UBA660]
  - "Bathyoplasmales" corrig. Zhu, Lian & He 2020 [MAG-NZ]
  - "Caccosomales" (sic) Pallen, Rodriguez-R & Alikhan 2022 [RFN20]
  - Culicoidibacterales Neupane et al. 2020
  - Erysipelotrichales Ludwig et al. 2010
  - Haloplasmatales Rainey et al. 2008 non Zhou et al. 2022
  - "Izemoplasmatales" corrig. Zheng et al. 2021 ("Liberiplasmatales")
  - Mycoplasmatales Freundt 1955 ("Borrelomycetales"; "Anulomycetales"; "Paramycetales"; "Mollicutales"; "Pleuropneumoniales"; Entomoplasmatales; Mycoplasmoidales)
  - Turicibacteraceae Verbarg et al. 2020 {MOL361}

== Kingdom Cyanoprokaryota ==
=== Phylum "Margulisiibacteriota" ===
Phylogeny of Margulisiibacteriota

- - "Saganbacteria"
  - - - "Marinamargulisbacteria"
      - "Riflemargulisbacteria"
    - "Termititenacia"

- Class "Saganbacteria" Carnevali et al. 2018 (WOR1)
- Class "Marinamargulisbacteria" Carnevali et al. 2019
- Class "Riflemargulisbacteria" Carnevali et al. 2019 (GWF2_35_9)
- Class "Termititenacia" Utami et al. 2019
  - "Termititenacales" Utami et al. 2019

=== Phylum "Cyanobacteriota" ===
Phylogeny of Cyanobacteriota

- - - "Sericytochromatia"
      - UBA7694
      - S15B-MN24
  - - Vampirovibrionia
      - - "Caenarcanales"
        - "Obscuribacterales"
      - - Vampirovibrionales
        - "Gastranaerophilales"
    - Cyanobacteria
      - "Gloeobacteria"
        Gloeobacterales
      - "Phycobacteria"
        - Thermostichales
        - - Gloeoemargaritales
          - - Pseudanabenales
            - - Acaryochloridales
              - - Neosynechococcales
                - - - FACHB-46
                    - - Leptolyngbyales
                      - - Nodosilineales
                        - Oculatellales
                  - - "Synechococcophycidae"
                      - B231
                      - - Prochlorotrichales
                        - - Synechococcales
                          - "Cyanobiales"
                    - "Nostocophycidae"
                      Cyanobacteriales

- Class "Sericytochromatia" Soo et al. 2017
  - S15B-MN24 ["Tanganyikabacteria"]
  - UBA7694 ["Blackallbacteria"; "Sericytochromatia"]
- Class Vampirovibrionia Chuvochina et al. 2024
  - "Caenarcaniphilales" Soo et al. 2014
  - "Gastranaerophilales" Di Rienzi et al. 2013
  - "Obscuribacterales" Soo et al. 2014
  - Vampirovibrionales Chuvochina et al. 2024
- Class Gloeobacteria Cavalier-Smith 2002
  - Gloeobacterales Cavalier-Smith 2002
- Class Phycobacteria Cavalier-Smith 2002
  - Acaryochloridales Miyashita et al. 2003 ex Strunecký & Mareš 2022 ("Thermosynechococcales")
  - ?Aegeococcales Strunecký & Mareš 2022
  - Cyanobacteriales Rippka & Cohen-Bazire 1983 (Chamaesiphonales, Chroococcales, Chroococcidiopsidales, Coleofasciculales, Desertifilales, Nostocales, Oscillatoriales, Pleurocapsales, Spirulinales, Stigonematales)
  - "Cyanobiales" Pallen, Rodriguez-R & Alikhan 2022 {PCC-630"}
  - ?"Eurycoccales"
  - ?Geitlerinematales Strunecký & Mareš 2022
  - Gloeoemargaritales Moreira et al. 2016
  - Leptolyngbyales Strunecký & Mareš 2022
  - ?"Limnotrichales" ?Trebuch et al. 2020
  - Neosynechococcales Chuvochina et al. 2024
  - Nodosilineales Strunecký & Mareš 2022 (Phormidesmidales)
  - Oculatellales Strunecký & Mareš 2022 (Elainellales)
  - Prochlorotrichales Strunecký & Mareš 2022 [PCC-9006]
  - Pseudanabenales Hoffmann, Komárek & Kastovsky 2005
  - ?"Pseudophormidiales"
  - Synechococcales Hoffmann, Komárek & Kastovsky 2005
  - Thermostichales Komárek & Strunecký 2020
  - Trichocoleaceae Mai & Johansen 2018 non Nakai {FACHB-46}
  - Trichothermofontia Daroch et al. 2023 {B231: B231}

== Kingdom Pseudomonadati ==
=== Incertae sedis ===
==== Phylum "Muiribacteriota" ====
Phylogeny of "Muiribacteriota"

- - "Wallbacteriia"
  - - "Muiribacteriia"
      "Muiribacteriales"
    - "Ozemibacteria"
      "Ozemibacterales"

- Class "Wallbacteriia" [UBA9980] (RIF33)
- Class "Muiribacteriia" corrig. Chuvochina et al. 2023
  - "Muiribacteriales" corrig. Chuvochina et al. 2023
- Class "Ozemibacteria" corrig. Kadnikov et al. 2018 (RIF32/ACD39)
  - "Ozemibacterales" corrig. Kadnikov et al. 2018

==== Phylum "Macinerneyibacteriota" ====
- Class "Macinerneyibacteriia" corrig. Yadav et al. 2020
  - "Macinerneyibacteriales" corrig. Yadav et al. 2020

==== Phylum "Sumerlaeota" ====
- Class "Sumerlaeia" Kadnikov et al. 2018
  - "Sumerlaeales" Kadnikov et al. 2018

==== Phylum "Salsurabacteriota" ====
- "Candidatus Salsurabacterium" Gutiérrez-Preciado et al. 2024 [T1Sed10-126; DAL-3Gt_29_1_96C5R]

==== Phylum Spirochaetota ====
Phylogeny of Spirochaetota

- - "Leptospirae" Leptospiria
    - Turneriellales
    - Leptospirales
  - "Euspirochaetae"
    - - Brachyspiria
        Brachyspirales
    - - - Brevinematia
          Brevinematales
      - - "Exilispiria"
          "Exilispirales"
        - Spirochaetia
          - - SP-2023
            - "Entomospirales"
          - - Borreliales
            - - - - Winmispirales
                  - "Salinispirales"
                - - - - UBA9216
                      - "Marispirochaetales"
                    - - DSM-17781
                      - Spirochaetales E
                  - - "Sediminispirochaetales"
                    - Sphaerochaetales
              - Treponematales

- Class Leptospiria Chuvochina et al. 2024
  - Leptospirales corrig. Gupta et al. 2014
  - Turneriellales Chuvochina et al. 2024
- Class Brachyspiria Chuvochina et al. 2024
  - Brachyspirales corrig. Gupta et al. 2014
- Class Brevinematia Chuvochina et al. 2024
  - Brevinematales Gupta et al. 2014
- Class "Exilispiria" Pallen, Rodriguez-R & Alikhan 2022
  - "Exilispirales" Pallen, Rodriguez-R & Alikhan 2022 [JAAYUW01]
- Class Spirochaetia Paster 2020
  - Borreliales Chuvochina et al. 2024
  - Spirochaeta cellobiosiphila Breznak & Warnecke 2008 {DSM-17781: DSM-17781: Spirochaeta_E}
  - "Entomospirales" Pallen, Rodriguez-R & Alikhan 2022 [WRBN01]
  - "Candidatus Haliotispira" Sharma et al. 2024 {SP-2023: SP-2023}
  - "Marispirochaetales" Pallen, Rodriguez-R & Alikhan 2022 [JC444]
  - "Salinispirales" Pallen, Rodriguez-R & Alikhan 2022 [DSM-27196]
  - "Sediminispirochaetales" Pallen, Rodriguez-R & Alikhan 2022 [DSM-16054]
  - Sphaerochaetales Chuvochina et al. 2024
  - ?Spirochaetales Buchanan 1917
  - "Thiospirochaetaceae" Pallen, Rodriguez-R & Alikhan 2022 {Spirochaetales_E} [DSM-2461]
  - "Candidatus Thalassospirochaeta" Pragya et al. 2024 {UBA9216: UBA9216}
  - Treponematales Chuvochina et al. 2024
  - Winmispirales Podosokorskaya et al. 2025

==== Phylum "Poribacteriota" ====
- Class ?"Entoporibacteria" Podell et al. 2019
- Class ?"Pelagiporibacteria" Podell et al. 2019

==== Phylum "Oederibacteriota" ====
Phylogeny of "Oederibacteriota"

- - "Firestoneibacteriia"
  - - - "Oederibacteriia"
        "Oederibacteriales"
    - - PGYV01
        PGYV01
      - "Muellerivitia"
        "Muellerivitales"

- Class "Firestoneibacteriia" [D2-FULL-39-29] (RIF1)
- Class "Oederibacteriia" Sereika et al. 2025
  - "Oederibacteriales" Sereika et al. 2025
- Class PGYV01
  - "Candidatus Cellulosimonas" Doud et al. 2020 {PGYV01: PGYV01: PGYV01}
- Class "Muellerivitia" Sereika et al. 2025
  - "Muellerivitales" Sereika et al. 2025

==== Phylum "Aerophobota" ====
- Class "Aerophobia" Chuvochina et al. 2023 (CD12)
  - "Aerophobales" Chuvochina et al. 2023

==== Phylum Atribacterota ====
Phylogeny of Atribacterota

- - Atribacteria
    Atribacterales
  - "Phoenicimicrobiia"
    "Phoenicimicrobiales"

- Class Atribacteria Katayama et al. 2021 (OP9)
  - Atribacterales Katayama et al. 2021 ("Caldatribacteriales")
- Class "Phoenicimicrobiia" Jiao et al. 2024
  - "Phoenicimicrobiales" Jiao et al. 2024

==== Phylum "Ryujiniota" ====
- Class "Ryujiniia" Sun et al. 2025
  - "Ryujiniales" Sun et al. 2025 [UBA6262]

==== Phylum "Shingomicrobia" ====
- Class SLGR01
  - SLGR01

==== Phylum Elusimicrobiota ====
Phylogeny of Elusimicrobiota

- - "Elusimicrobiia"
    - "Obscuribacteriales"
    - Elusimicrobiales
  - "Endomicrobiia"
    "Endomicrobiales"

- Class "Elusimicrobiia" Oren, Parte & Garrity 2016 ex Cavalier-Smith 2020 (TG1)
  - Elusimicrobiales Geissinger et al. 2010
  - "Obscuribacteriales" Uzun et al. 2023
- Class "Endomicrobiia" Stingl et al. 2018
  - "Endomicrobiales" Zheng et al. 2018

==== Phylum JAHJDO01 ====
- JAHJDO01
  - "Candidatus Piabacter" Vigneron et al. 2025

==== Phylum "Omnitrophota" ====
Phylogeny of Omnitrophota

- - "Omnitrophia"
    "Omnitrophales"
  - "Gorgyraia"
    - "Kappaeales"
    - - "Tantalellales"
      - - - "Aquiviventales"
          - "Pluralincolimonadales"
        - - - "Aquitaenarimonadales"
            - - "Gorgyraeales"
              - "Velesiimonadales"
          - - "Taenaricolales"
            - - "Kaelpiales"
              - - "Duberdicusellales"
                - - - "Ghiorseimicrobiales"
                    - "Gygaeellales"
                  - - "Velamenicoccales"
                    - "Zapsychrales"

- Class "Omnitrophia" Williams et al. 2021 (OP3)
  - "Omnitrophales" Williams et al. 2021
- Class "Gorgyraia" Seymour et al. 2023
  - "Aquitaenarimonadales" Seymour et al. 2022
  - "Aquiviventales" Seymour et al. 2022
  - "Duberdicusellales" Seymour et al. 2022
  - "Ghiorseimicrobiales" Seymour et al. 2022
  - "Gorgyraeales" Seymour et al. 2023
  - "Gygaeellales" Seymour et al. 2023 ("Profunditerraquicolales")
  - "Kaelpiales" Seymour et al. 2022
  - "Kappaeales" Seymour et al. 2022 [JAGLLT01]
  - "Pluralincolimonadales" Seymour et al. 2022
  - "Taenaricolales" Seymour et al. 2022
  - "Tantalellales" Seymour et al. 2022 ("Makaraimicrobiales")
  - "Velamenicoccales" Pallen, Rodriguez-R & Alikhan 2022
  - "Velesiimonadales" Seymour et al. 2022
  - "Zapsychrales" Seymour et al. 2022 ("Fredricksoniimonadales")

=== Clade Planctobacteria ===
==== Phylum "Hydrogenedentota" ====
- Class "Hydrogenedentia" Chuvochina et al. 2023 (NKB19)
  - "Hydrogenedentales" corrig. Chuvochina et al. 2023

==== Phylum Planctomycetota ====
Phylogeny of Planctomycetota

- - - "Brocadiia"
      "Brocadiales"
  - - - "Uabimicrobiia"
        "Uabimicrobiales"
      - "Saltatorellae"
        "Saltatorellales"
    - - Phycisphaeria
        - Sedimentisphaerales
        - - Tepidisphaerales
          - Phycisphaerales
      - Planctomycetia
        - "Kolteriales"
        - - Gemmatales
          - - Isosphaerales
            - - Planctomycetales
              - Pirellulales

- Class "Brocadiia" JLodha, Narvekar & Karodi 2021
  - "Brocadiales" Jetten et al. 2010 ("Hypogeohydatales")
  - ?"Wukongales" Wu et al. 2023 [YC18]
- Class "Uabimicrobiia" Lodha, Narvekar & Karodi 2021
  - "Uabimicrobiales" Lodha, Narvekar & Karodi 2021
- Class "Saltatorellae" (sic) Wiegand et al. 2019
  - "Saltatorellales" Wiegand et al. 2019 (UBA1135: UBA1135)
- Class Phycisphaeria Oren, Parte & Garrity 2016
  - Phycisphaerales Fukunaga et al. 2010
  - Sedimentisphaerales Spring et al. 2018
  - Tepidisphaerales Kovaleva et al. 2015
- Class Planctomycetia Ward 2020
  - Gemmatales Dedysh et al. 2020
  - Isosphaerales Dedysh et al. 2020
  - "Kolteriales" Kallscheuer et al. 2025
  - Pirellulales Dedysh et al. 2020
  - Planctomycetales Schlesner & Stackebrandt 1987 em. Ward 2011

==== Phylum "Auribacterota" ====
Phylogeny of "Auribacterota"

- - - "Tritonobacteria"
      "Tritonobacterales"
    - "Erginobacteria"
      "Erginobacterales"
  - - - "Auribacteria"
        "Auribacterales"
    - - "Ancaeobacteria"
        "Ancaeobacterales"
      - JACPWU01
        "Theseobacterales"

- Class "Ancaeobacteria" Williams et al. 2022
  - "Ancaeobacterales" Williams et al. 2022
- Class "Auribacteria" Williams et al. 2022
  - "Auribacterales" Williams et al. 2022
- Class "Erginobacteria" Williams et al. 2022
  - "Erginobacterales" Williams et al. 2022
- Class JACPWU01
  - "Theseobacterales" Williams et al. 2022
- Class "Tritonobacteria" Williams et al. 2022
  - "Tritonobacterales" Williams et al. 2022

==== Phylum Chlamydiota ====
Phylogeny of Chlamydiota

- Chlamydiia
  - Chlamydiales

- Class Chlamydiia Horn 2011
  - Chlamydiales Storz & Page 1971 em. Everett et al. 1999 (Parachlamydiales; "Amoebachlamydiales"; "Anoxychlamydiales"; "Similichlamydiales"; "Simkaniales")

==== Phylum Verrucomicrobiota ====
Phylogeny of Verrucomicrobiota

- - - Lentisphaeria
      - Lentisphaerales
      - - Oligosphaerales
        - Victivallales
    - Kiritimatiellae
      - "Spyradenecales"
      - Kiritimatiellales
  - - Verrucomicrobiia
      - Opitutales
      - - Limisphaerales
        - - Methylacidiphilales
          - - Terrimicrobiales
            - Verrucomicrobiales

- Class Lentisphaeria Cho et al. 2004
  - Lentisphaerales Cho et al. 2004
  - Oligosphaerales Qiu et al. 2013
  - Victivallales Cho et al. 2004
- Class Kiritimatiellae Spring et al. 2017
  - Kiritimatiellales Spring et al. 2017 (Tichowtungiales)
  - "Spyradenecales" Pallen, Rodriguez-R & Alikhan 2022 [RFP12]
- Class Verrucomicrobiia corrig. Hedlund, Gosink & Staley 1998
  - Limisphaerales Podosokorskaya et al. 2023 ("Pedosphaerales")
  - Methylacidiphilales Awala et al. 2023
  - Opitutales Choo et al. 2007 (Puniceicoccales)
  - Terrimicrobiales García-López et al. 2020 ("Chthoniobacterales")
  - Verrucomicrobiales Ward-Rainey et al. 1996 em. Yoon et al. 2008

=== Clade FCB group ===
==== Phylum "Heilongiota" ====
- Class "Heilongiia" corrig. Zhang et al. 2022
  - ?"Heilongiales" Zhang et al. 2022

==== Phylum "Tianyaibacteriota" ====
- ?"Candidatus Tianyaibacterium" corrig. Cui et al. 2021

==== Phylum "Hinthialibacterota" ====
- Class "Hinthialibacteria" Williams et al. 2022
  - "Hinthialibacterales" Williams et al. 2022 (OLB16)

==== Phylum "Tangaroaeota" ====
- Class "Tangaroaeia" Sun et al. 2025 [RBG-13-66-14]
  - "Tangaroaeales" Sun et al. 2025 (Hyd24-12)

==== Phylum "Hydrothermota" ====
Phylogeny of Caldifarciminota

- - "Stahliibacteriia"
  - - "Tepidihabitantia"
      "Tepidihabitantales"
    - Caldifarciminia
      - "Hydrothermales"
      - "Caldipriscales"

- Class "Stahliibacteriia" (UBA3073)
- Class "Tepidihabitantia" Slobodkina et al. 2025
  - "Tepidihabitantales" Slobodkina et al. 2025
- Class Caldifarciminia Mori et al. 2026
  - ?Caldifarciminales Mori et al. 2026
  - "Hydrothermales" Chuvochina et al. 2019 ex Chuvochina et al. 2023 (EM3)
  - "Caldipriscales" Pallen, Rodriguez-R & Alikhan 2022 [LBFQ01]

==== Phylum "Fermentibacterota" ====
- Class "Fermentibacteria" Kirkegaard 2016 ("Aegiribacteria")
  - "Fermentibacterales" Kirkegaard 2016 (Hyd24-12)

==== Phylum "Cloacimonadota" ====
Phylogeny of "Cloacimonadota"

- "Cloacimonadia"
  - JGIOTU-2
  - "Cloacimonadales"

- Class "Cloacimonadia" Williams et al. 2021 ex Chuvochina et al. 2023
  - "Candidatus Celaenobacter" Williams et al. 2021 {JGIOTU-2: JGIOTU-2}
  - "Cloacimonadales" Williams et al. 2021 ex Chuvochina et al. 2023 (WWE1)

==== Phylum "Arandabacterota" ====
- Class "Arandabacteria" Gong et al. 2022
  - "Arandabacterales" Gong et al. 2022

==== Phylum "Orphanbacterota" ====
- Class "Orphanbacteria" Gong et al. 2022
  - "Orphanbacterales" Gong et al. 2022

==== Phylum "Joyebacterota" ====
- Class "Joyebacteria" Gong et al. 2022
  - "Joyebacterales" Gong et al. 2022

==== Phylum "Krumholzibacteriota" ====
Phylogeny of "Krumholzibacteriota"

- "Krumholzibacteriia"
  - "Delphibacterales"
  - "Krumholzibacteriales"

- Class "Krumholzibacteriia" corrig. Youssef et al. 2019
  - "Delphibacterales" (DOLZORAL124_64_63; LZORAL124-64-63)
  - "Krumholzibacteriales" Youssef et al. 2019

==== Phylum Gemmatimonadota ====
Phylogeny of Gemmatimonadota

- - "Glassbacteria"
  - - Gemmatimonadetes
      - "Cryogemmatales"
      - - Gemmatimonadales
        - - Longimicrobiales
          - "Palaucibacterales"

- Class "Glassbacteria" (RIF5)
- Class Gemmatimonadetes Zhang et al. 2003
  - "Cryogemmatales" Tan et al. 2026 [JACCXV01]
  - Gemmatimonadales Zhang et al. 2003
  - Longimicrobiales Pascual et al. 2016 (Gaopeijiales)
  - "Palaucibacterales" Aldeguer-Riquelme, Antón & Santos 2022 [PAUC43f]

==== Phylum "Latescibacterota" ====
Phylogeny of "Latescibacterota"

- - "Handelsmanbacteria"
  - - "Latescibacteria"
      "Latescibacterales"

- Class "Handelsmanbacteria" (RIF27)
- Class "Latescibacteria" Chuvochina et al. 2023
  - "Latescibacterales" Chuvochina et al. 2023 (WS3)

==== Phylum "Blakebacterota" ====
- Class "Blakebacteria" Gong et al. 2022
  - "Blakebacterales" Gong et al. 2022

==== Phylum Fibrobacterota ====
Phylogeny of Fibrobacterota

- - - Chitinivibrionia
      Chitinivibrionales
  - - "Raymondiibacteriia"
    - - Fibrobacteria
        Fibrobacterales

- Class Chitinivibrionia Sorokin et al. 2014
  - Chitinivibrionales Sorokin et al. 2014 ["Chitinispirillales"]
- Class "Raymondbacteria" (RIF7; OXYB2-FULL-49-7)
- Class Fibrobacteria Spain et al. 2012
  - Fibrobacterales Spain et al. 2012 ("Fibromonadales")

==== Phylum "Electryoneota" ====
Phylogeny of "Electryoneota"

- - - "Tariuqbacteria"
      "Tariuqbacterales"
  - - "Electryoneia"
      "Electryoneales"
    - AABM5‑125‑24
      "Hatepunaeales"

- Class "Tariuqbacteria" Vigneron, Vincent & Lovejoy 2023
  - Tariuqbacterales Vigneron, Vincent & Lovejoy 2023
- Class "Electryoneia" Williams et al. 2022
  - Electryoneales Williams et al. 2022
- Class AABM5-125-24
  - Hatepunaeales Williams et al. 2022

==== Phylum Fidelibacterota ====
Phylogeny of Fidelibacterota

- - Fidelibacteria
    Fidelibacterales
  - "Marinisomatia"
    "Marinisomatales"

- ?"Candidatus Neomarinimicrobium" Rinke et al. 2013 corrig. Oren et al. 2020
- Class Fidelibacteria Katayama et al. 2024
  - Fidelibacterales Katayama et al. 2024
- Class "Marinisomatia"
  - "Marinisomatales" (Candidate phylum SAR406; candidate phylum Marine Group A)

==== Phylum "Zhuqueibacterota" ====
Phylogeny of "Zhuqueibacterota"

- - "Cosmopoliia"
    "Cosmopoliales"
  - "Zhuqueibacteria"
    - "Thermofontimicrobiales"
    - - - "Oceanimicrobiales"
        - "Zhuqueibacterales"
      - - "Geothermoviventaceae"
        - - "Oleimicrobiales"
          - "Residuimicrobiales"

- Class "Cosmopoliia" corrig. Zhang et al. 2023
  - "Cosmopoliales" Zhang et al. 2023 [QNDG01]
- Class "Zhuqueibacteria" Lian et al. 2024
  - "Geothermoviventaceae" Lian et al. 2024
  - "Oceanimicrobiales" Lian et al. 2024
  - "Oleimicrobiales" Lian et al. 2024
  - "Residuimicrobiales" Lian et al. 2024
  - "Thermofontimicrobiales" Lian et al. 2024
  - "Zhuqueibacterales" Lian et al. 2024

==== Phylum Calditrichota ====
- Class Calditrichia Kublanov et al. 2022
  - Calditrichales Kublanov et al. 2020

==== Phylum Bacteroidota ====
Phylogeny of Bacteroidota

- - - - "Ignavibacteriia"
        - "Eximiradiales"
        - - - "Tepidaquicellales"
            - - "Costitxiales"
              - "Kryptoniales"
          - Ignavibacteriales
    - - Chlorobiia
        Chlorobiales
      - Rhodothermia
        - Balneolales
        - Rhodothermales
  - - Bacteroidia
      - Cytophagales
      - - SolTP2
        - - Chitinophagales
          - - Flavobacteriales
            - - Flavobacteriales D
              - - Flavobacteriales E
                - - Flavobacteriales G
                  - - - B-17B0
                      - - "Pollutiaquabacterales"
                        - Sphingobacteriales
                    - Bacteroidales

- Class "Ignavibacteriia" Oren, Parte & Garrity 2016 ex Cavalier-Smith 2022
  - "Costitxiales" Gago et al. 2024
  - "Kapaibacteriales" Chuvochina et al. 2023 ("Eximiradiales")
  - Ignavibacteriales Iino et al. 2010
  - "Kryptoniales"
  - "Tepidaquicellales" corrig. Kadnikov et al. 2020
- Class Chlorobiia Oren, Parte & Garrity 2016 ex Cavalier-Smith 2020
  - Chlorobiales Gibbons & Murray 1978
- Class Rhodothermia Munoz, Rossello-Mora & Amann 2017
  - Balneolales Munoz, Rossello-Mora & Amann 2017
  - Rhodothermales Munoz, Rossello-Mora & Amann 2017
- Class Bacteroidia Krieg 2012
  - Aurantibacillaceae Vieira et al. 2023 {B-17B0}
  - Bacteroidales Krieg 2012 (Marinilabiliales; "Sulfidibacteriales")
  - Chitinophagales Munoz, Rossello-Mora & Amann 2017 (Saprospirales)
  - Cytophagales Leadbetter 1974 ("Asporangiales"; "Cyclobacteriales")
  - Flavobacteriales Bernardet 2012
  - Flavobacteriales_D
  - "Candidatus Krakonobacterium" Hubert et al. 2025 {SolTP2: SolTP2}
  - "Pollutiaquabacterales" Begmatov et al. 2025
  - Salibacteraceae Bowman 2021 {Flavobacteriales_G}
  - Sphingobacteriales Kämpfer 2012
  - Vicingaceae Bowman 2021 {Flavobacteriales_E}

=== Clade Proteobacteria ===
==== Phylum "Canglongiota" ====
- Class "Canglongiliia" Zhang et al. 2022
  - ?"Canglongiales" Zhang et al. 2022

==== Phylum Acidobacteriota ====
Phylogeny of Acidobacteriota

- - - "Holophagia"
      - Thermotomaculales
      - - Acanthopleuribacterales
        - Holophagales
  - - - Thermoanaerobaculia
        - "Multivorales"
        - - Gp7-AAB
          - Thermoanaerobaculales
    - - - "Polarisedimenticolia"
          "Polarisedimenticolales"
      - - - "Guanabaribacteriia"
            "Guanabaribacteriales"
          - Vicinamibacteria
            - "Marinacidobacterales"
            - Vicinamibacterales
        - - - "Fischerbacteria"
            - - "Aminicenantia"
                "Aminicenantales"
          - - Blastocatellia
              - - "Chloracidobacteriales"
                - UBA7656
              - Blastocatellales
            - "Acidobacteriia"
              - "Versatilivorales"
              - - "Acidiferrales"
                - - Bryobacterales
                  - Acidobacteriales

- Class "Holophagia" Oren, Parte & Garrity 2016
  - Acanthopleuribacterales Fukunaga et al. 2008
  - Holophagales Fukunaga et al. 2008
  - Thermotomaculales Dedysh & Yilmaz 2018
- Class Thermoanaerobaculia Dedysh & Yilmaz 2018
  - "Candidatus Gilichinskyi" Sipes et al. 2024 {Gp7-AAB: Gp7-AAB}
  - "Multivorales" Nguyen 2022
  - Thermoanaerobaculales Dedysh & Yilmaz 2018
- Class "Polarisedimenticolia" Flieder et al. 2021
  - "Polarisedimenticolales" Flieder et al. 2021
- Class "Guanabaribacteriia" corrig. Tschoeke et al. 2020
  - "Guanabaribacteriales" corrig. Tschoeke et al. 2020
- Class Vicinamibacteria Dedysh & Yilmaz 2018
  - "Marinacidobacterales" Nguyen 2022
  - Vicinamibacterales Dedysh & Yilmaz 2018 ("Luteitaleales")
- Class "Fischerbacteria" (RIF25; HRBIN11)
- Class "Aminicenantia" Chuvochina et al. 2023
  - "Aminicenantales" Kadnikov et al. 2019 ex Chuvochina et al. 2023 (OP8)
- Class Blastocatellia Pascual et al. 2016
  - ?"Frugalibacteriales" Ruhl et al. 2022
  - Blastocatellales Pascual et al. 2016 (Pyrinomonadales)
  - "Chloracidobacteriales" Saini et al. 2026
  - "Candidatus Onstottus" Sipes et al. 2024 {UBA7656: UBA7656}
- Class Acidobacteriia Thrash & Coates 2010
  - Acidobacteriales Cavalier-Smith 2002 (Terriglobales)
  - "Acidiferrales" corrig. Epihov et al. 2021
  - Bryobacterales Dedysh & Yilmaz 2018 ("Solibacterales")
  - "Versatilivorales" Nguyen 2022

==== Phylum "Acidulodesulfobacteriota" ====
- Class "Acidulodesulfobacteriia" (sic) Pallen, Rodriguez-R & Alikhan 2022 [SZUA-79]
  - "Acidulidesulfobacterales" corrig. Tan et al. 2019

==== Phylum "Calescibacteriota" ====
- Class "Calescibacteriia" Chuvochina et al. 2023 (EM19)
  - "Calescibacteriales" Chuvochina et al. 2023

==== Phylum "Dadaibacteriota" ====
- Class "Dadabacteria" (sic) Hug et al. 2016 [CSP1-2]
  - ?"Dadaibacteriales" corrig. ?Baquiran et al. 2020
  - "Nemesobacterales" Gavriilidou et al. 2023

==== Phylum Campylobacterota_A ====
- Class Desulfurellia Waite et al. 2020
  - Desulfurellales Kuever, Rainey & Widdel 2006

==== Phylum Thermosulfidibacterota ====
- Class Thermosulfidibacteria Cavalier-Smith 2020 ex Chuvochina et al. 2024
  - Thermosulfidibacterales Cavalier-Smith 2020 ex Chuvochina et al. 2024

==== Phylum Aquificota ====
Phylogeny of Aquificota

- Aquificia
  - Desulfurobacteriales
  - Aquificales

- Class Aquificia corrig. Reysenbach 2002
  - Desulfurobacteriales Gupta & Lali 2014
  - Aquificales Reysenbach 2002 (Hydrogenothermales)

==== Phylum "Lernaellota" ====
Phylogeny of "Lernaellota"

- "Lernaellia"
  - "Alcyoniellaceae"
  - "Lernaellales"

- Class "Lernaellia" Williams et al. 2022 [FEN-1099]
  - "Alcyoniellaceae" Williams et al. 2022 {JAVCCG01}
  - "Lernaellales" Williams et al. 2022

==== Phylum Myxococcota ====
Phylogeny of Myxococcota

- - "Kuafubacteriia"
    "Kuafubacteriales"
  - Myxococcia
    Myxococcales

- Class "Kuafubacteriia" corrig. Li et al. 2023
  - "Kuafubacteriales" Li et al. 2023 [WYAZ01: GCA_016703535]
- Class Myxococcia Waite et al. 2020
  - Myxococcales Tchan, Pochon & Prévot 1948 [Archangiales; "Angiobacteriales"; "Angiococcales"] (fruiting gliding bacteria)

==== Phylum Bdellovibrionota ====
Phylogeny of Bdellovibrionota

- - Bdellovibrionia
    Bdellovibrionales
  - Bacteriovoracia
    Bacteriovoracales

- Class "Bdellonasia" Bergot et al. 2026
  - ?"Bdellonasales" Bergot et al. 2026
- Class Bdellovibrionia Waite et al. 2020
  - Bdellovibrionales Garrity, Bell & Lilburn 2006
- Class Bacteriovoracia Waite et al. 2020
  - Bacteriovoracales Hahn et al. 2017

==== Phylum SAR324 ====
- Class Lambdaproteobacteria Anantharaman et al. 2016 (RIF24)

==== Phylum "Oligoflexaeota" ====
Phylogeny of "Oligoflexaeota"

- - Oligoflexia
    - Oligoflexales
    - Silvanigrellales

- Class Oligoflexia Nakai et al. 2014
  - Oligoflexales Nakai et al. 2014
  - Silvanigrellales Hahn et al. 2017

==== Phylum Myxococcota_A ====
Phylogeny of Myxococcota_A

- - Bradymonadia
    Bradymonadales
  - Polyangia
    - Nannocystales
    - - Haliangiales
      - Polyangiales

- Class Bradymonadia corrig. Chuvochina et al. 2024
  - Bradymonadales Wang et al. 2015
- Class Polyangiia corrig. Waite et al. 2020
  - Haliangiales Waite et al. 2020
  - Nannocystales (Reichenbach 2007) Waite et al. 2020
  - Polyangiales Tchan, Pochon & Prevot 1948 [Myxobacterales]

==== Phylum "Nitrosediminicolota" ====
- ?Candidatus "Nitrosediminicola" Zhao, Jorgensen & Babbin 2024

==== Phylum "Moduliflexota" ====
- Class "Moduliflexia" Sekiguchi et al. 2015 (KSB3)
  - "Moduliflexales" Sekiguchi et al. 2015 ("Vecturitrichales")

==== Phylum "Methylomirabilota" ====
Phylogeny of "Methylomirabilota"

- "Methylomirabilia"
  - "Methylomirabilales"
  - "Rokubacteriales"

- Class "Methylomirabilia" Chuvochina et al. 2023
  - "Methylomirabilales" Cabrol et al. 2020 ex Chuvochina et al. 2023
  - "Rokubacteriales" (CSP1-6)

==== Phylum "Spongiamicota" ====
- Class "Spongiamicia" Sun et al. 2025 [UBA8248]
  - "Spongiamicales" Sun et al. 2025

==== Phylum "Tectimicrobiota" ====
- Class "Entotheonellia" Chuvochina et al. 2023
  - "Entotheonellales" Schmidt et al. 2000 ex Chuvochina et al. 2023

==== Phylum Nitrospinota ====
- Class Nitrospinia Lucker et al. 2022
  - Nitrospinales Lucker et al. 2022

==== Phylum Nitrospirota ====
Phylogeny of Nitrospirota

- - - Thermodesulfovibrionia
      Thermodesulfovibrionales
  - - Leptospirillia
      Leptospirillales
    - Nitrospiria
      - "Troglogloeales"
      - Nitrospirales

- Class Thermodesulfovibrionia Umezawa et al. 2023
  - ?"Mariimomonadales" Yoon et al. 2023
  - Thermodesulfovibrionales Umezawa et al. 2023 ["Magnetobacteriales"]
- Class Leptospirillia Chuvochina et al. 2024
  - Leptospirillales Chuvochina et al. 2024
- Class Nitrospiria Garrity & Holt 2022
  - Nitrospirales Garrity & Holt 2022
  - "Troglogloeales" Yu et al. 2022 ["Manganitrophales"]

==== Phylum Thermodesulfobacteriota ====
Phylogeny of Thermodesulfobacteriota

- - - - "Deferrimicrobiia"
        Deferrimicrobiales Begmatov et al. 2022
      - Syntrophorhabdia
        Syntrophorhabdales Waite et al. 2020
    - - - - "Zymogeniia"
            "Zymogeniales"
        - - "Desulfocorpusculia"
            "Desulfocorpusculales"
          - Syntrophia
            Syntrophales
      - - - "Binatia"
            "Binatales"
          - Deferrisomatia
            Deferrisomatales
        - - Desulfuromonadia
            - Geobacterales
            - Desulfuromonadales
  - - - "Anaeroferrophilia"
        "Anaeroferrophilales"
      - Desulfomonilia
        - UBA1062
        - Desulfomonilales
    - - - - - "Desulfofervidia"
              "Desulfofervidales"
          - - Dissulfuribacteria
              Dissulfuribacterales
            - "Thermodesulfobacteriia"
              Thermodesulfobacteriales
        - - Desulfovibrionia
            Desulfovibrionales
      - - - Desulfobulbia
            Desulfobulbales
        - - - Syntrophobacteria
              Syntrophobacterales
          - - - - "Desulfatiglandia"
                  Desulfatiglandales
              - - Desulfobaccia
                  Desulfobaccales
                - Desulfarculia
                  - "Adiutricales"
                  - Desulfarculales
            - - Desulfobacteria
                Desulfobacterales

- Class "Deferrimicrobiia" corrig. Begmatov et al. 2022
  - Deferrimicrobiales Begmatov et al. 2022
- Class Syntrophorhabdia Waite et al. 2020
  - Syntrophorhabdales Waite et al. 2020
- Class "Zymogeniia" corrig. Murphy et al. 2021
  - "Zymogeniales" Murphy et al. 2021
- Class "Desulfocorpusculia" Slobodkina et al. 2025
  - "Desulfocorpusculales" Slobodkina et al. 2025
- Class Syntrophia Waite et al. 2020
  - Syntrophales Waite et al. 2020
- Class "Binatia" Chuvochina et al. 2019 ex Chuvochina et al. 2023
  - "Binatales" Chuvochina et al. 2019 ex Chuvochina et al. 2023
- Class Deferrisomatia Waite et al. 2020
  - Deferrisomatales Waite et al. 2020
- Class Desulfuromonadia Waite et al. 2020
  - Desulfuromonadales corrig. Kuever, Rainey & Widdel 2006
  - Geobacterales Waite et al. 2020
- Class "Anaeroferrophilia" corrig. Murphy et al. 2021
  - "Anaeroferrophilales" Murphy et al. 2021 ["Tharpellales"]
- Class Desulfomonilia Waite et al. 2020
  - Desulfomonilales Waite et al. 2020
  - "Candidatus Phosphitivorax" Figueroa et al. 2018 {UBA1062: UBA1062}
- Class "Desulfofervidia" Waite et al. 2020
  - "Desulfofervidales" Waite et al. 2020
- Class Dissulfuribacteria Waite et al. 2020
  - Dissulfuribacterales Waite et al. 2020
- Class Thermodesulfobacteriia corrig. Hatchikian, Ollivier & Garcia 2002
  - Thermodesulfobacteriales Hatchikian, Ollivier & Garcia 2002
- Class Desulfovibrionia Waite et al. 2020
  - Desulfovibrionales Kuever, Rainey & Widdel 2006
- Class Desulfobulbia Waite et al. 2020
  - Desulfobulbales Waite et al. 2020
- Class Syntrophobacteria Waite et al. 2020
  - Syntrophobacterales Waite et al. 2020
- Class "Desulfatiglandia" Pallen, Rodriguez-R & Alikhan 2022 [DSM-4660]
  - Desulfatiglandales Waite et al. 2020
- Class Desulfobaccia Waite et al. 2020
  - Desulfobaccales Waite et al. 2020
- Class Desulfarculia Waite et al. 2020
  - "Adiutricales" Waite et al. 2020
  - Desulfarculales corrig. Kuever, Rainey & Widdel 2006
- Class Desulfobacteria Waite et al. 2020
  - Desulfobacterales Kuever, Rainey & Widdel 2006

==== Phylum "Babelota" ====
- Class "Babelia" corrig. Yeoh et al. 2016 (TM6)
  - "Babelales" corrig. Yeoh et al. 2016

==== Phylum Chrysiogenota ====
Phylogeny of Chrysiogenota

- - Chrysiogenia
    Chrysiogenales
  - "Deferribacteria"
    Deferribacterales

- Class Chrysiogenia corrig. Garrity & Holt 2002
  - Chrysiogenales Garrity & Holt 2002
- Class "Deferribacteria" Oren, Parte & Garrity 2016
  - Deferribacterales Huber & Stetter 2002 ["Geovibriales"]

==== Phylum Campylobacterota ====
- Class "Campylobacteria" Oren, Parte & Garrity 2016 ex Waite et al. 2017
  - Campylobacterales Garrity, Bell & Lilburn 2006 (Nautiliales)

==== Phylum Pseudomonadota ====
Phylogeny of Pseudomonadota

- - - Magnetococcia
      Magnetococcales
    - "Caulobacteria"
      - - - "Scatocolales"
          - "Enterousiales"
      - - - - WRAU01
            - - CAJXXZ01
              - Holosporales
        - - - "Rickettsiidae"
              Rickettsiales
          - "Caulobacteridae" cont'd
  - - "Mariprofundia"
      Mariprofundales
    - "Pseudomonadia"
      - Thiohalorhabdales
      - - - "Acidithiobacillidae"
            Acidithiobacillales
        - - - "Neisseriidae"
              - "Tethybacterales"
              - Burkholderiales
          - "Pseudomonadidae" cont'd

- Class "Anaeropigmentatia" corrig. Murphy et al. 2021
  - ?Anaeropigmentatales corrig. Murphy et al. 2021
- Class Magnetococcia Chuvochina et al. 2024
  - Magnetococcales Bazylinski et al. 2013
- Class Caulobacteria" Oren, Parte & Garrity 2016 ex Cavalier-Smith 2020
  - ?"Acroporibacterales" Porcel Sanchis et al. 2026
  - ?"Methylospongiales" Podell et al. 2020
  - "Enterousiales" Pallen, Rodriguez-R & Alikhan 2022 {Rs-D84}
  - "Hepatincolaceae" Szokoli et al. 2016 {WRAU01}
  - Holosporales Szokoli et al. 2016
  - "Scatocolales" Pallen, Rodriguez-R & Alikhan 2022 [RF32]
  - CAJXXZ01
  - Sublass "Rickettsiidae" corrig. Ferla et al. 2013
    - Rickettsiales Gieszczykiewicz 1939 emend. Dumler et al. 2001

Phylogeny of "Caulobacteridae"

- - - "Polyceribacterales"
    - - "Methylaequorales"
      - - "Pelagibacterales"
        - - RS24
          - - - - Micropepsales
                - Caulobacterales
              - - "Futianiales"
                - Rhodobacterales
            - Hyphomicrobiales
  - - - - UBA9655
        - "Caedimonadales"
      - - UBA6184
        - Paracaedibacterales
    - - - - Elsterales
          - - Oceanibaculales
            - - Thalassobaculales
              - Puniceispirillales
        - - - "Inquilinales"
            - - BOG-932
              - "Micavibrionales"
          - - Radicibacterales
            - Azospirillales
      - - - Rhodospirillales
          - Acetobacterales
        - - Reyranellales
          - - - Dongiales
              - - "Tagaeales"
                - "Stellales"
            - - - "Marivibrionales"
                - Kiloniellales
              - - JAJUGE01
                - - - "Planktothermales"
                    - - Tistrellales
                      - Geminicoccales
                  - - - Ferrovibrionales
                      - - Minwuiales
                        - Sneathiellales
                    - - - Zavarziniales
                        - - CGMCC-115125
                          - Parvibaculales
                      - Sphingomonadales

  - Sublass "Caulobacteridae" Ferla et al. 2013
    - Acetobacterales Chuvochina et al. 2024
    - Azospirillales Chuvochina et al. 2024
    - "Ca. Bealeia" Szokoli et al. 2016 {UBA9655: UBA9655}
    - "Ca. Bodonicaedibacter" corrig. Midha et al. 2021 {UBA6184: UBA6184}
    - Caulobacterales Henrici & Johnson 1935 (Hyphomonadales; Maricaulales; "Parvularculales")
    - "Caedimonadales"
    - Constrictibacter Yamada et al. 2011 {JAJUGE01: JAJUGE01}
    - Dongiales Chuvochina et al. 2024
    - Elsterales Chuvochina et al. 2024
    - Ferrovibrionales Chuvochina et al. 2024
    - "Futianiales" Liu et al. 2022
    - Geminicoccales Chuvochina et al. 2024
    - Hyphomicrobiales Douglas 1957 (Rhizobiales; "Rhodobacteriales"; "Bartonellales"; "Nitrobacterales")
    - "Inquilinales" Pallen, Rodriguez-R & Alikhan 2022 [DSM-16000]
    - Kiloniellales Wiese et al. 2009
    - "Marivibrionales" Pallen, Rodriguez-R & Alikhan 2022
    - "Methylaequorales" Glass, Warters & Alajlan 2025
    - "Methylospongiales" Podell et al. 2020
    - "Micavibrionales"
    - "Ca. Micropelagius" Jimenez-Infante et al. 2014 {RS24: RS24}
    - Micropepsales Harbison et al. 2016
    - Minwuiales Sun et al. 2018
    - Oceanibaculales Chuvochina et al. 2024
    - "Paracaedibacterales" Chuvochina et al. 2023
    - Parvibaculales Chuvochina et al. 2024
    - "Pelagibacterales" Grote et al. 2012
    - "Planktothermales" Zhou et al. 2020 [UBA7887]
    - "Polyceribacterales" Porcel Sanchis et al. 2026 [JABSOH01]
    - Puniceispirillales Chuvochina et al. 2024
    - Pyruvatibacter Wang et al. 2016 {CGMCC-115125}
    - Radicibacterales
    - Reyranellales Chuvochina et al. 2024
    - Rhodobacterales Garrity, Bell & Lilburn 2006
    - Rhodospirillales Pfennig & Truper 1971
    - "Roseiterribacteraceae" Nakai et al. 2024 {BOG-932}
    - Sphingomonadales Yabuuchi & Kosako 2006 (Emcibacterales; Iodidimonadales; Kordiimonadales; Rhodothalassiales)
    - Sneathiellales Kurahashi et al. 2008
    - Stellales Pallen, Rodriguez-R & Alikhan 2022 [ATCC43930]
    - "Tagaeales" Pallen, Rodriguez-R & Alikhan 2022 [CACIAM-22H2]
    - Thalassobaculales Chuvochina et al. 2024
    - Tistrellales Chuvochina et al. 2024
    - Zavarziniales Chuvochina et al. 2024
- Class "Mariprofundia" Cavalier-Smith 2020 ["Zetaproteobacteria"]
  - Mariprofundales Makita et al. 2017
- Class Pseudomonadia" Oren, Parte & Garrity 2016
  - ?"Felimaribacterales" Porcel Sanchis et al. 2026
  - ?"Ferritrophicales" Weiss et al. 2007
  - ?"Kopriimonadales" Kwon et al. 2005c
  - ?"Siderophilales" corrig. Corbera-Rubio et al. 2024
  - ?"Spongiifermentales" Nguyen et al. 2023
  - Thiohalorhabdales Sorokin & Merkel 2023
  - Subclass "Acidithiobacillidae" Cavalier-Smith 2020
    - Acidithiobacillales Garrity, Bell & Lilburn 2005
  - Subclass "Neisseriidae" Cavalier-Smith 2020 (Betaproteobacteria)
    - Burkholderiales Garrity, Bell & Lilburn 2006 ("Ferrovales"; "Gallionellales"; Hydrogenophilales; "Leptotrichales"; Methylophilales; Neisseriales; Nitrosomonadales; "Procaibacterales"; Rhodocyclales; Spirillales; Sulfuricellales)
    - "Tethybacterales" Taylor et al. 2021

Phylogeny of "Pseudomonadidae"

- - - Acidiferrobacterales
    - Arenicellales
  - - Immundisolibacterales
    - - - - Nevskiales
          - - "Macondimonadales"
            - - Natronospirales
              - Steroidobacterales
        - - - Cardiobacteriales
            - - - "Magnimaribacterales"
                - "Johnevansiales"
              - - "Thioglobales"
                - Thiomicrospirales
          - Xanthomonadales
      - - - Nitrococcales
          - "Competibacterales"
        - - - - - "Halofilales"
                - Granulosicoccales
              - Halothiobacillales
            - - "Poriferisulfidales"
              - - - DSM-5130
                  - Ectothiorhodospirales
                - Thiotrichales
          - - - "Chromatiae"
                - - "Sulfuriflexales"
                  - - - "Inmiraniales"
                      - - "Thiogranales"
                        - Thiohalobacterales
                    - - "Thioalbales"
                      - - "Tenderiales"
                        - - - "Thiohalophilales"
                            - Thiohalospirales
                          - - "Reidiellales"
                            - Thiohalomonadales
                - - Methylococcales
                  - Chromatiales
            - - - - "Eutrophobiales"
                  - - Methylohalomonadales
                    - "Porifericomitales"
                - Beggiatoales
              - - Nitrosococcales
                - - "Thiopontiales"
                  - - "Enterobacteriae"
                      - - - Piscirickettsiales
                          - Francisellales
                        - - Legionellales
                          - - "Aquicellales"
                            - - Diplorickettsiales
                              - - - "Comchoanobacterales"
                                  - - "Berkiellales"
                                    - UBA6186
                                - - "Protisticellales"
                                  - Coxiellales
                      - - Enterobacterales
                        - Pseudomonadales

  - Subclass "Pseudomonadidae" Cavalier-Smith 2020
    - Acidiferrobacterales Kojima, Shinohara & Fukui 2015
    - Acidihalobacteraceae Chuvochina et al. 2024 {DSM-5130}
    - "Aquicellales" Pallen, Rodriguez-R & Alikhan 2022 [DSM-16500]
    - Arenicellales Teramoto, Yagyu & Nishijima 2015
    - "Azoamicaceae" Speth et al. 2023 {UBA6186}
    - Beggiatoales Buchanan 1957
    - "Berkiellales" Chuvochina et al. 2023
    - Cardiobacteriales Garrity, Bell & Lilburn 2005
    - Chromatiales Imhoff 2005
    - "Comchoanobacterales" Needham et al. 2022
    - "Competibacterales" Chuvochina et al. 2023
    - Coxiellales Chuvochina et al. 2024
    - Diplorickettsiales Chuvochina et al. 2024
    - Ectothiorhodospirales Chuvochina et al. 2024
    - Enterobacterales Adeolu et al. 2016 ("Aerobacterales"; Aeromonadales; Alteromonadales; "Bacteriales"; "Bacteriomycetales"; Kangiellales; Orbales; Pasteurellales; "Pelagibaculales"; "Vibrionales")
    - "Eutrophobiales" Weiss et al. 2007 ex Prabhu et al. 2024
    - Francisellales Chuvochina et al. 2024
    - Granulosicoccales Chuvochina et al. 2024
    - "Halofilales" Pallen, Rodriguez-R & Alikhan 2022 [XJ16]
    - Halothiobacillales Chuvochina et al. 2024
    - Immundisolibacterales Corteselli, Aitken & Singleton 2017
    - "Inmiraniales" Pallen, Rodriguez-R & Alikhan 2022 [DSM-100275]
    - "Johnevansiales" Chuvochina et al. 2023 ("Evansiales") [CACTJB01]
    - Legionellales Garrity, Bell & Lilburn 2005
    - "Macondimonadales" Pallen, Rodriguez-R & Alikhan 2022 [UBA5335]
    - "Magnimaribacterales" Ramfelt et al. 2024 [SAR86: SAR156]
    - Methylococcales Bowman 2005
    - Methylohalomonadales Sorokin & Merkel 2023
    - Natronospirales Sorokin et al. 2025
    - Nevskiales Naushad et al. 2015 ("Salinisphaerales")
    - Nitrococcales Chuvochina et al. 2024
    - Nitrosococcales Chuvochina et al. 2024
    - Piscirickettsiales Chuvochina et al. 2024
    - "Porifericomitales" Nguyen et al. 2023
    - "Poriferisulfidales" Nguyen et al. 2023 ex Chuvochina et al. 2023
    - "Protisticellales" Bolzoni et al. 2026 [UBA9339]
    - Pseudomonadales Orla-Jensen 1921 (Cellvibrionales; "Marinioligotrophales"; Moraxellales; Oceanospirillales; "Siderobacterales")
    - "Reidiellales" Pallen, Rodriguez-R & Alikhan 2022 [GCF-013343005]
    - Steroidobacterales Chuvochina et al. 2024 ("Dormimicrobiales"; "Foliamicales"; "Rariloculales"; Woeseiales)
    - "Sulfuriflexales" Pallen, Rodriguez-R & Alikhan 2022 [AKS1]
    - "Tenderiales" Chuvochina et al. 2023
    - "Thioalbales" Pallen, Rodriguez-R & Alikhan 2022 [DSM-26407]
    - "Thioglobales" Pallen, Rodriguez-R & Alikhan 2022 [PS1]
    - "Thiogranales" Pallen, Rodriguez-R & Alikhan 2022 [DSM-19610]
    - Thiohalobacterales Sorokin & Merkel 2023
    - Thiohalomonadales Sorokin & Merkel 2023
    - "Thiohalophilales" Pallen, Rodriguez-R & Alikhan 2022 {UBA6429}
    - Thiohalospirales Sorokin & Merkel 2023
    - Thiomicrospirales Chuvochina et al. 2024
    - "Thiopontiales" Pallen, Rodriguez-R & Alikhan 2022 [GCF-002020875]
    - Thiotrichales Garrity, Bell & Lilburn 2005
    - Xanthomonadales Saddler & Bradbury 2005 non Chadefaud 1950a (Lysobacterales)

== List of Candidate Phyla ==
- "Qinglongiota" Zhang et al. 2022
- "Salinosulfoleibacteria" Tazi et al. 2006
- "Teskebacteria" Dojka 1998 (WS1)

== See also ==
- Branching order of bacterial phyla (Woese, 1987)
- Branching order of bacterial phyla (Gupta, 2001)
- Branching order of bacterial phyla (Cavalier-Smith, 2002)
- Branching order of bacterial phyla (Rappe and Giovanoni, 2003)
- Branching order of bacterial phyla (Battistuzzi et al., 2004)
- Branching order of bacterial phyla (Ciccarelli et al., 2006)
- Branching order of bacterial phyla after ARB Silva Living Tree
- Branching order of bacterial phyla (Genome Taxonomy Database, 2018)
- Bacterial phyla
- List of Archaea genera
- List of bacteria genera
- LPSN, list of accepted bacterial and archaeal names
- Human microbiome project
- Microorganism
