= Coprothermobacter platensis =

Scientific classification
- Domain: Bacteria
- Kingdom: Pseudomonadati
- Phylum: Coprothermobacterota
- Class: Coprothermobacteria
- Order: Coprothermobacterales
- Family: Coprothermobacteraceae
- Genus: Coprothermobacter
- Species: C. platensis

Binomial name
- Coprothermobacter platensis Etchebehere et al. 1998

Type strain
- 3R = DSM 11748

Species of bacterium

Coprothermobacter platensis is a species of moderately thermophilic and strictly anaerobic bacterium belonging to the family Coprothermobacteraceae within the phylum Coprothermobacterota.

Like another species in the genus, Coprothermobacter proteolyticus, these bacteria are proteolytic, enabling them to break down proteins in anaerobic conditions. In C. platensis, this capability is related to the source from where this bacterium was firstly isolated, the sludge blanket of a methanogenic, mesophilic anaerobic reactor used for the treatment of protein-rich wastewater from a baker's yeast factory, in Uruguay (region bounded by the Rio de la Plata river, giving rise to the name "platensis" for this species, though this bacterium was not isolated from the river).

The bacterial cells are straight, rod-shaped, about 1.5–2 μm long and 0.5 μm in diameter, non-motile, non-spore-forming and stain Gram-negative. The temperature conditions for growing range from 35 to 65°C, with an optimum temperature of 55°C at pH values close to neutrality; optimum pH is about 7.0, though this bacterium tolerates pH conditions ranging from 4.3 to 8.3.
