= Coprothermobacter proteolyticus =

Scientific classification
- Domain: Bacteria
- Phylum: Coprothermobacterota
- Class: Coprothermobacteria
- Order: Coprothermobacterales
- Family: Coprothermobacteraceae
- Genus: Coprothermobacter
- Species: C. proteolyticus

Binomial name
- Coprothermobacter proteolyticus (Ollivier et al. 1985) Rainey and Stackebrandt 1993

Type strain
- BT = ATCC 35245= DSM 5265

Synonyms
- Thermobacteroides proteolyticus Ollivier et al. 1985

Species of bacterium

Coprothermobacter proteolyticus, formerly Thermobacteroides proteolyticus, is a thermophilic, non-spore-forming bacteria.

Coprothermobacter proteolyticus was originally isolated from a thermophilic digester that was fermenting tannery wastes and cattle manure. These bacteria are rod-shaped and stain Gram-negative, although the cell structure is Gram-positive. The growth range is 35 to 75 °C and pH 5.5 to 8.5, with the optimum growth conditions of 63 °C at pH 7.5. The species uses sugars poorly unless yeast extract and either rumen fluid or Tripticase peptone are available.

The bacteria was previously classified as Thermobacteroides proteolyticus until further study led researchers to propose a new genus, Coprothermobacter, for this microorganism. The new genus refers to the fact that this microorganism was originally isolated from manure and for its thermophilic qualities.
