= Rubrobacter bracarensis =

Scientific classification
- Domain: Bacteria
- Kingdom: Bacillati
- Phylum: Actinomycetota
- Class: Rubrobacteria
- Order: Rubrobacterales
- Family: Rubrobacteraceae
- Genus: Rubrobacter
- Species: R. bracarensis

Binomial name
- Rubrobacter bracarensis Jurado et al. 2013

Type strain
- CECT 7924, DSM 24098, DSM 24908, VF70612_S1

Synonyms
- Halorubrobacter lusitanus

Species of bacterium

Rubrobacter bracarensis is a Gram-positive, spore-forming and aerobic bacterium from the genus Rubrobacter which has been isolated from biofilm from the Vilar de Frades Church in Portugal.
