= Rubrobacter aplysinae =

Scientific classification
- Domain: Bacteria
- Kingdom: Bacillati
- Phylum: Actinomycetota
- Class: Rubrobacteria
- Order: Rubrobacterales
- Family: Rubrobacteraceae
- Genus: Rubrobacter
- Species: R. aplysinae

Binomial name
- Rubrobacter aplysinae Kämpfer et al. 2014

Type strain
- CECT 8425, DSM 27440, RV113

Species of bacterium

Rubrobacter aplysinae is a Gram-positive and non-spore-forming bacterium from the genus Rubrobacter which has been isolated from the sponge Aplysina aerophoba from Rovinj in Croatia.
