= Rubrobacter calidifluminis =

Scientific classification
- Domain: Bacteria
- Kingdom: Bacillati
- Phylum: Actinomycetota
- Class: Rubrobacteria
- Order: Rubrobacterales
- Family: Rubrobacteraceae
- Genus: Rubrobacter
- Species: R. calidifluminis

Binomial name
- Rubrobacter calidifluminis Albuquerque et al. 2014

Type strain
- CECT 8308, JCM 19154, RG-1T

Species of bacterium

Rubrobacter calidifluminis is a thermophilic and strictly aerobic bacterium from the genus Rubrobacter which has been isolated from the São Miguel Island in the Azores.
