= Rubrobacter marinus =

Scientific classification
- Domain: Bacteria
- Kingdom: Bacillati
- Phylum: Actinomycetota
- Class: Rubrobacteria
- Order: Rubrobacterales
- Family: Rubrobacteraceae
- Genus: Rubrobacter
- Species: R. marinus

Binomial name
- Rubrobacter marinus Chen et al. 2020

Type strain
- SCSIO 52915

Species of bacterium

Rubrobacter marinus is a Gram-positive bacterium from the genus Rubrobacter which has been isolated from deep-sea sediments from the South China Sea.
