= Coprothermobacter =

Scientific classification
- Domain: Bacteria
- Kingdom: Pseudomonadati
- Phylum: Coprothermobacterota
- Class: Coprothermobacteria
- Order: Coprothermobacterales
- Family: Coprothermobacteraceae
- Genus: Coprothermobacter; Rainey and Stackebrandt 1993

Type species
- Coprothermobacter proteolyticus (Ollivier et al. 1985) Rainey and Stackebrandt 1993

Species
- C. platensis; C. proteolyticus

Genus of bacteria

Coprothermobacter is a genus of rod-shaped microorganisms, belonging to the bacterial family Coprothermobacteraceae of the phylum Coprothermobacterota. This taxonomic genus has been reclassified in 2018, after different phylogenetic studies showed that these bacteria represented a deeply branched taxon of the domain Bacteria; consequently, the clade including this genus has been classified in a separate phylum from Firmicutes, the phylum where it was included before reclassification.

According to the first description of this genus, the etymology of its name derives from Greek words "kopros", meaning dung, from the source where one of the species (Coprothermobacter proteolyticus) was isolated, and "thermos", meaning hot, warm, because of the relatively high temperatures at which these bacteria are able to grow, which can be as high as 75 °C.

Actually, very few known bacterial species are included in this genus, which are characterized by sharing genetic information with microorganisms belonging to Archaea, a taxonomic domain separate from the domain Bacteria. For this reason, Coprothermobacteria are considered a diverging lineage of bacteria.

Among the species included in this genus, Coprothermobacter platensis and Coprothermobacter proteolyticus (formerly named Thermobacteroides proteolyticus) are the only strains with validly published names.

== See also ==
- List of bacteria genera
- List of bacterial orders
