= Rubrobacter xylanophilus =

Scientific classification
- Domain: Bacteria
- Kingdom: Bacillati
- Phylum: Actinomycetota
- Class: Rubrobacteria
- Order: Rubrobacterales
- Family: Rubrobacteraceae
- Genus: Rubrobacter
- Species: R. xylanophilus

Binomial name
- Rubrobacter xylanophilus Carreto et al. 1996

Species of bacterium

Rubrobacter xylanophilus is a thermophilic species of bacteria. It is slightly halotolerant, short rod- and coccus-shaped and gram-positive, with type strain PRD-1^{T}. It is the only known true radiation resistant thermophile. It can degrade xylan and hemicellulose. The first strain of the genus Rubrobacter was isolated from gamma-irradiated hot spring water samples by Yoshinaka. This organism was found to be extremely gamma-radiation resistant, with a higher shoulder dose than the canonical radiation resistant species of the genus Deinococcus. The organism stained Gram-positive and was slightly thermophilic with an optimum growth temperature of about 60 °C..Genome sequencing of Rubrobacter xylanophilus has revealed numerous genes involved in DNA repair and oxidative stress protection, which are thought to contribute to its extreme resistance to radiation. The species produces a thermostable D-amino acid oxidase that remains active at 65 °C.
