= Alpha,alpha-trehalose synthase =

Class of enzymes

Identifiers
- EC no.: 2.4.1.245

Databases
- IntEnz: IntEnz view
- BRENDA: BRENDA entry
- ExPASy: NiceZyme view
- KEGG: KEGG entry
- MetaCyc: metabolic pathway
- PRIAM: profile
- PDB structures: RCSB PDB PDBe PDBsum
Search
- PMC: articles
- PubMed: articles
- NCBI: proteins

Alpha,alpha-trehalose synthase (EC 2.4.1.245, trehalose synthase, trehalose synthetase, UDP-glucose:glucose 1-glucosyltransferase, TreT, PhGT) is an enzyme with systematic name ADP-glucose:D-glucose 1-alpha-D-glucosyltransferase. This enzyme catalyses the following chemical reaction

D-glucose
+ UDP-glucose
UDP
UDP
trehalose

This reversible reaction forms trehalose by combining D-glucose with a second glucose unit which is attached to the phosphate group of a nucleoside such as uridine diphosphate (UDP) or adenosine diphosphate. The enzyme first characterised from Thermococcus litoralis requires magnesium ion, Mg^{2+} for maximal activity. It has also been found in other thermophilic bacteria including Pyrococcus horikoshii, Rubrobacter xylanophilus, and Thermoproteus tenax.
