= Dictyoglomi-1 RNA motif =

Dictyoglomi-1 RNA
- Consensus secondary structure of Dictyoglomi-1 RNAs. This figure is adapted from a previous publication.

Identifiers
- Symbol: Dictyoglomi-1
- Rfam: RF01703

Other data
- RNA type: Gene; sRNA;
- Domain: Bacteria;
- SO: SO:0000655
- PDB structures: PDBe

The Dictyoglomi-1 RNA motif (also called dct-1) is a conserved RNA structure that was discovered via bioinformatics. Only four instances of the RNA were detected, and all are in the bacterial phylum Dictyoglomota (formerly Dictyoglomi), whose members have not been extensively studied. The RNA might have a cis-regulatory role, but the evidence is ambiguous. Because of the few instances of Dictyoglomi-1 RNAs known, it is also unknown whether the RNA structure might extend further in the 5′ or 3′ direction, or in both directions.

The Dictyoglomi-1 RNA motif conserves four bulged-G modules (also called E-loops) Bulged-G modules are often associated with intermolecular interactions, and multiple examples are found in ribosomal RNAs. However the biological role that the four bulged-G modules play in the context of Dictyoglomi-1 RNAs remains unknown.
