= Rubrobacter =

Scientific classification
- Domain: Bacteria
- Kingdom: Bacillati
- Phylum: Actinomycetota
- Class: Rubrobacteria
- Order: Rubrobacterales; Rainey et al. 1997
- Family: Rubrobacteraceae; Rainey et al. 1997
- Genus: Rubrobacter; Suzuki et al. 1989

Type species
- Rubrobacter radiotolerans (Yoshinaka, Yano & Yamaguchi 1973) Suzuki et al. 1989

Species
- See text

Genus of bacteria

Rubrobacter is a genus of Actinomycetota. It is radiotolerant and may rival Deinococcus radiodurans in this regard.

== Phylogeny ==
The currently accepted taxonomy is based on the List of Prokaryotic names with Standing in Nomenclature (LPSN) and National Center for Biotechnology Information (NCBI).

16S rRNA based LTP_10_2024

- Rubrobacter
  - R. taiwanensis Chen et al. 2004
  - - - R. xylanophilus Carreto et al. 1996
      - - R. calidifluminis Albuquerque et al. 2014
        - R. naiadicus Albuquerque et al. 2014
    - - R. spartanus Norman et al. 2017
      - - - R. marinus Chen et al. 2020
          - R. tropicus Chen et al. 2020
        - - - R. aplysinae Kämpfer et al. 2014
            - R. bracarensis Jurado et al. 2013
          - - R. indicoceani Chen et al. 2018
            - R. radiotolerans (Yoshinaka, Yano & Yamaguchi 1973) Suzuki et al. 1989

120 marker proteins based GTDB 10-RS226

- Rubrobacter
  - R. taiwanensis
  - - R. xylanophilus
    - - - R. calidifluminis
        - R. naiadicus
      - - - R. indicoceani
          - R. radiotolerans
        - - R. tropicus
          - - R. aplysinae
            - R. marinus

Incertae sedis:

- "R. wessexii"
