= Prochlorothrix =

Scientific classification
- Domain: Bacteria
- Kingdom: Bacillati
- Phylum: Cyanobacteriota
- Class: Cyanophyceae
- Order: Prochlorotrichales; Strunecký & Mares [ICNafp]
- Family: Prochlorotrichaceae; Burger-Wiersma et al. 1989 [ICNP]
- Genus: Prochlorothrix; Burger-Wiersma et al. 1989 [ICNP]
- Species: P. hollandica

Binomial name
- Prochlorothrix hollandica Burger-Wiersma et al. 1989 [ICNP]

Genus of cyanobacteria

Prochlorothrix hollandica is a filamentous, freshwater species of cyanobacteria named under the Bacteriological Code in 1989. It is the only species in genus Prochlorothrix, which is the only species in family Prochlorotrichaceae, which is the only family in order Prochlorotrichales. The lineage produces chlorophyll b. It is found in temperate and subpolar zones, in freshwater and brackish water. The lineage is sister to Synechococcales.

Three full genomes have been sequenced for the type species. Three more genomes representing intrageneric-level divergence are known from metagenomics.
