= Egicoccus =

Scientific classification
- Domain: Bacteria
- Kingdom: Bacillati
- Phylum: Actinomycetota
- Class: Nitriliruptoria
- Order: Egicoccales; Zhang et al. 2016
- Family: Egicoccaceae; Zhang et al. 2016
- Genus: Egicoccus; Zhang et al. 2016
- Species: E. halophilus

Binomial name
- Egicoccus halophilus Zhang et al. 2016

Type strain
- CGMCC 1.14988, KCTC 33612, EGI 80432

Genus of bacteria

Egicoccus halophilus is a Gram-positive, moderately halophilic, alkalitolerant, non-spore-forming and non-motile bacterium from the genus Egicoccus which has been isolated from saline-alkaline soil in Xinjiang in China.
