= Coprothermobacteraceae =

Scientific classification
- Domain: Bacteria
- Kingdom: Pseudomonadati
- Phylum: Coprothermobacterota
- Class: Coprothermobacteria
- Order: Coprothermobacterales
- Family: Coprothermobacteraceae; Pavan et al. 2018

Genus
- Coprothermobacter

Family of bacteria

Coprothermobacteraceae is a bacterial family of rod-shaped microorganisms, belonging to the order Coprothermobacterales, class Coprothermobacteria of the phylum Coprothermobacterota.

The name of this family was given on the basis of an early genus identified within this group, dubbed "Coprothermobacter", whose etymology derives from Greek "kopros", meaning manure, and "thermos", warm, from the source where these bacteria were collected and the temperature conditions in which they are able to grow, which can be up to 75 °C.

This taxonomic family has been introduced in 2018, after a phylogenetic reclassification of the genus Coprothermobacter, which has been based on published studies that shown that these bacteria actually represent a deeply branched taxon of the domain Bacteria. Consequently, the clade including this genus has been classified in the phylum Coprothermobacterota, a separate phylum from Firmicute, where Coprothermobacter was formerly included before the reclassification. Actually, Coprothermobacteraceae is the only family belonging to the order Coprothermobacterales.
