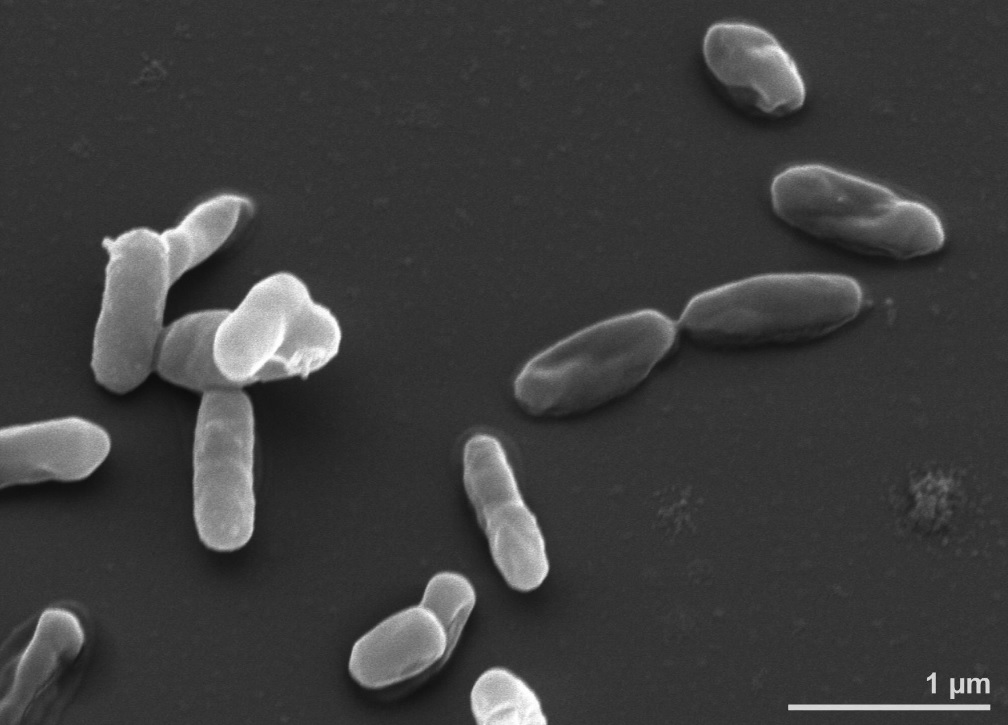
- Image of Nitriliruptor Alkaliphilus

Scientific classification
- Domain: Bacteria
- Kingdom: Bacillati
- Phylum: Actinomycetota
- Class: Nitriliruptoria
- Order: Nitriliruptorales; Sorokin et al. 2009
- Family: Nitriliruptoraceae; Sorokin et al. 2009
- Genus: Nitriliruptor; Sorokin et al. 2009
- Species: N. alkaliphilus

Binomial name
- Nitriliruptor alkaliphilus Sorokin et al. 2009

Type strain
- ANL-iso2, DSM 45188, NCCB 100119, UNIQEM U239

= Nitriliruptor =

Species of bacterium

Nitriliruptor alkaliphilus is a non-spore-forming and non-motile bacterium from the genus Nitriliruptor which has been isolated from sediments from a soda lake in Siberia in Russia.
