= Acidiferrobacter =

Scientific classification
- Domain: Bacteria
- Kingdom: Pseudomonadati
- Phylum: Pseudomonadota
- Class: Gammaproteobacteria
- Order: Acidiferrobacterales
- Family: Acidiferrobacteraceae
- Genus: Acidiferrobacter; Hallberg et al. 2011

Type species
- Acidiferrobacter thiooxydans

Species
- A. thiooxydans

Genus of bacteria

Acidiferrobacter is an acidophilic, thermotolerant, and facultatively anaerobic genus of bacteria with one known species (Acidiferrobacter thiooxydans). This genera has been included in new order called Acidiferrobacterales in 2015. A. thiooxydans has been isolated from refuse from a coal mine from Calloway County, Kentucky, in the United States.
