= Egibacter =

Scientific classification
- Domain: Bacteria
- Kingdom: Bacillati
- Phylum: Actinomycetota
- Class: Nitriliruptoria
- Order: Egibacterales; Zhang et al. 2016
- Family: Egibacteraceae; Zhang et al. 2016
- Genus: Egibacter; Zhang et al. 2016
- Species: E. rhizosphaerae

Binomial name
- Egibacter rhizosphaerae Zhang et al. 2016

Type strain
- CGMCC 1.14997, KCTC 39588, EGI 80759

Genus of bacteria

Egibacter rhizosphaerae is a Gram-positive, obligately halophilic, facultatively alkaliphilic, non-spore-forming, and non-motile bacterium from the genus Egibacter which has been isolated from the rhizosphere of the plant Tamarix hispida in Xinjiang in China.
