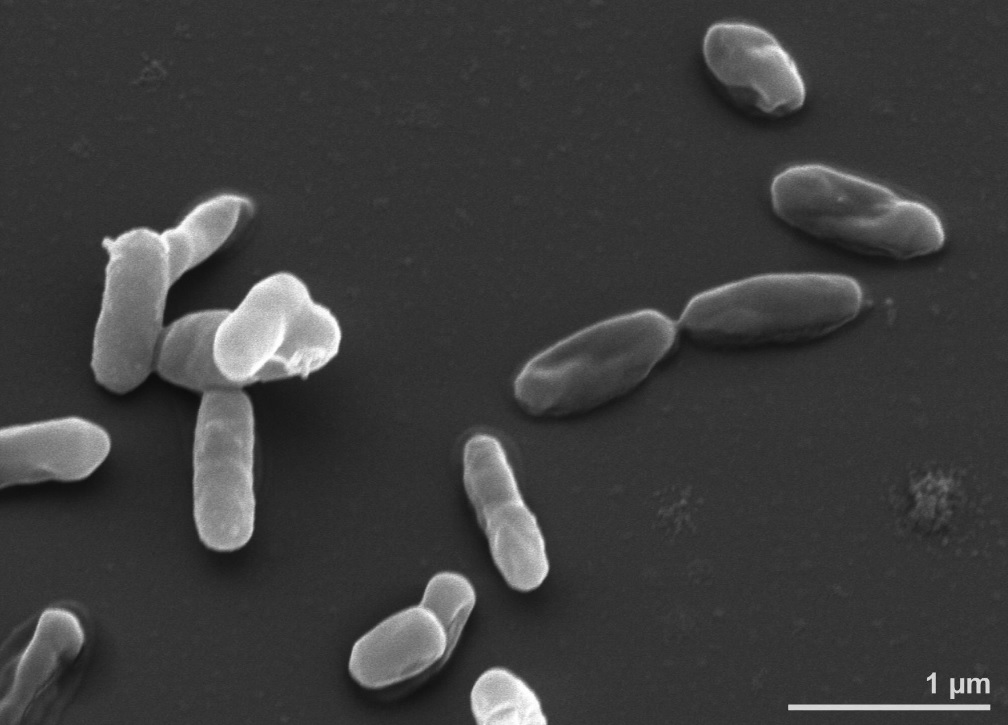
- Nitriliruptoria alkaliphilus

Scientific classification
- Domain: Bacteria
- Kingdom: Bacillati
- Phylum: Actinomycetota
- Class: Nitriliruptoria; Ludwig et al. 2013

Orders
- Egibacterales; Euzebyales; Nitriliruptorales; Salsipaludibacterales; "Stomatohabitantales"

Synonyms
- Nitriliruptoridae Kurahashi et al. 2010

= Nitriliruptoria =

Class of bacteria

The Nitriliruptoria are a class of Actinomycetota, which contains five species distributed across orders.

== Phylogeny ==
The currently accepted taxonomy is based on the List of Prokaryotic names with Standing in Nomenclature (LPSN) and National Center for Biotechnology Information (NCBI).

Chen et al. 2019

- Nitriliruptoria
  - - Egibacter
    - Euzebya
  - - Egicoccus
    - Nitriliruptor

16S rRNA based LTP_10_2024

- Nitriliruptoria
  - - Egibacterales
      - Egibacteraceae
        Egibacter Zhang et al. 2016
    - Euzebyales
      - Euzebyaceae
        Euzebya Kurahashi et al. 2010
  - - Salsipaludibacterales Salsipaludibacteraceae
      Salsipaludibacter Almeida et al. 2022
    - Nitriliruptorales Nitriliruptoraceae
      - Nitriliruptor Sorokin et al. 2009
      - - Egicoccus Zhang et al. 2015
        - Profundirhabdus Liu et al. 2023

120 marker proteins based GTDB 10-RS226

- Nitriliruptoria
  - Euzebyales
    - Egibacteraceae
      Egibacter
    - Euzebyaceae
      - Euzebya
      - "Stomatohabitans" Yang et al. 2024
  - Nitriliruptorales
    - Nitriliruptoraceae
      - Salsipaludibacter
      - - Egicoccus
        - Nitriliruptor
