= Thermoanaerobaculia =

Scientific classification
- Domain: Bacteria
- Kingdom: Pseudomonadati
- Phylum: Acidobacteriota
- Class: Thermoanaerobaculia; Dedysh and Yilmaz 2018

Type genus
- Thermoanaerobaculum Losey et al. 2013

Orders
- "Multivorales"; Thermoanaerobaculales

Class of bacteria

The Thermoanaerobaculia is a class of Acidobacteriota.

== Phylogeny ==
The currently accepted taxonomy is based on the List of Prokaryotic names with Standing in Nomenclature and the phylogeny is based on 16S rRNA sequences. Numbered families do not yet have any cultured representatives.

16S rRNA based LTP_10_2024

- Thermoanaerobaculia Thermoanaerobaculales
  - Family 14
  - Thermoanaerobaculaceae

120 marker proteins based GTDB 10-RS226

- Thermoanaerobaculia
  - "Multivorales"
    - "Multivoraceae"
      "Ca. Multivorans" Nguyen 2022
  - Thermoanaerobaculales
    - "Sulfomarinibacteraceae"
      "Ca. Sulfomarinibacter" Flieder et al. 2021
    - Thermoanaerobaculaceae
      Thermoanaerobaculum Losey et al. 2013

Unassigned genus:

- "Can. Gilichinskyi" Sipes et al. 2024

== See also ==
- List of bacterial orders
- List of bacteria genera
