= Minisyncoccota =

Scientific classification
- Domain: Bacteria
- Kingdom: Bacillati
- Phylum: Minisyncoccota; Nakajima et al. 2025

Type genus
- Minisyncoccus Nakajima et al. 2025

Classes
- "Gracilibacteria"; "Microgenomatia"; Minisyncoccia; "Patescibacteriia"; "Saccharimonadia"

Synonyms
- "Parcubacteria" Rinke et al. 2013; "Saccharimonadota" corrig. Albertsen et al. 2013; "Pacebacteria" Brown et al. 2015; "Gracilibacteria" Rinke et al. 2013; "Microgenomatota" corrig. Rinke et al. 2013; "Microgenomates" Rinke et al. 2013; "Saccharibacteria" Albertsen et al. 2013; "Patescibacteriota" Dutkiewicz et al. 2025; "Paceibacterota" corrig. Brown et al. 2015; "Altimarinota" corrig. Rinke et al. 2013

Monotypic phylum of Bacillati bacteria

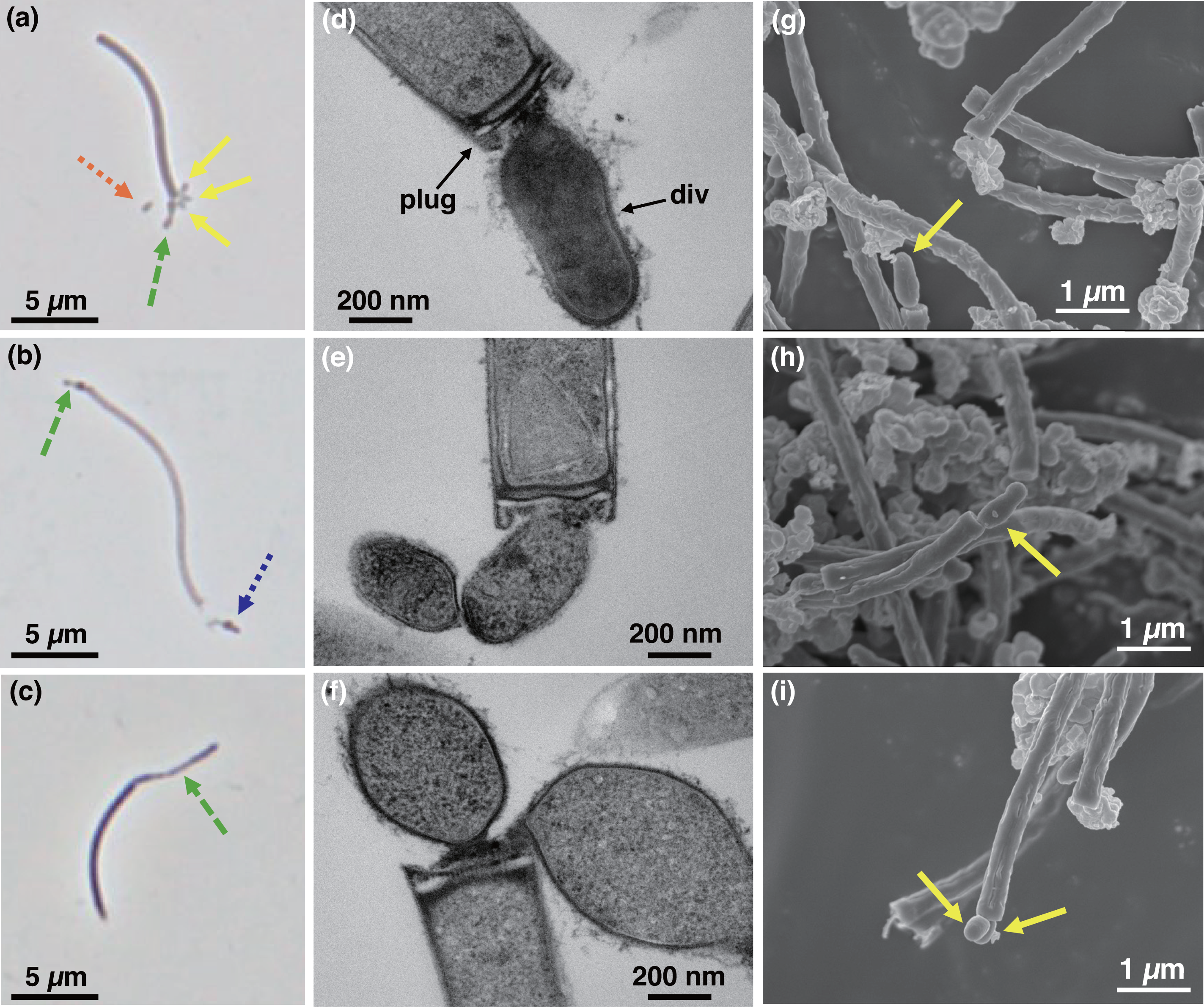
Micrographs of Minisyncoccus archaeiphilus strain PMX.108T cells attached to the archaeon Methanospirillum hungatei strain DSM 864 T cells in the two-strain co-culture

Minisyncoccota is a monotypic phylum of the kingdom Bacillati. It contains one valid class Minisyncoccia.
