= Sericytochromatia =

Scientific classification (Candidatus)
- Domain: Bacteria
- Kingdom: Bacillati
- Phylum: Cyanobacteriota
- Class: "Sericytochromatia"; Soo et al., 2017
- Clade: "Tanganyikabacteria"; Tran et al., 2021

Non-photosynthetic class of cyanobacteria

"Sericytochromatia" is a monotypic class of non-photosynthetic cyanobacteria. It contains unclassified lineages and the unranked clade "Tanganyikabacteria". "Tanganyikabacteria" also has only unclassified lineages.
