= Thermoanaerobaculum aquaticum =

Scientific classification
- Domain: Bacteria
- Kingdom: Pseudomonadati
- Phylum: Acidobacteriota
- Class: Thermoanaerobaculia
- Order: Thermoanaerobaculales; Dedysh and Yilmaz 2018
- Family: Thermoanaerobaculaceae; Dedysh and Yilmaz 2018
- Genus: Thermoanaerobaculum; Losey et al. 2013
- Species: T. aquaticum

Binomial name
- Thermoanaerobaculum aquaticum Losey et al. 2013

Type strain
- DSM 24856; JCM 18256; MP-01

Species of bacteria

Thermoanaerobaculum aquaticum is a species of Acidobacteriota.
