= Polarisedimenticola svalbardensis =

Scientific classification (Candidatus)
- Domain: Bacteria
- Kingdom: Pseudomonadati
- Phylum: Acidobacteriota
- Class: "Candidatus Polarisedimenticolia"; Flieder et al. 2021
- Order: "Candidatus Polarisedimenticolales"; Flieder et al. 2021
- Family: "Candidatus Polarisedimenticolaceae"; Flieder et al. 2021
- Genus: "Candidatus Polarisedimenticola"; Flieder et al. 2021
- Species: P. svalbardensis

Binomial name
- Polarisedimenticola svalbardensis Flieder et al. 2021

Type strain
- MAG AM4

Species of bacteria

"Candidatus Polarisedimenticola svalbardensis" is a candidate species of Acidobacteriota.
