= Vulcanimicrobiota =

- Vulcanimicrobium alpinus. Phase-contrast micrograph, scale bar; 10 μm, B and C Ultrathin section images of the cells showing the cell structure (scale bars; 200 nm for B, 5 μm for C). D Negative stain micrographs (scale bar; 1 μm). The arrows indicate the cell structures: IM Inner membrane, LPS Lipopolysaccharide, MV Membrane vesicle, OM Outer membrane, PG Peptidoglycan, PP polyphosphate granules, PHA Polyhydroxyalkanoates, UG Unidentified granules, VPM Vesicular photosynthetic membranes.

Scientific classification
- Domain: Bacteria
- Kingdom: incertae sedis
- Phylum: Vulcanimicrobiota; Yabe et al. 2024

Type genus
- Vulcanimicrobium corrig. Yabe et al. 2023

Classes and orders
- "Eudoremicrobiia"; Vulcanimicrobiia; Ca. "Xenobiia"

Synonyms
- "Eremiobacteraeota" (sic) Ji et al. 2017; "Eremiobacterota" corrig. Ji et al. 2017; "Palusbacterota" Ward, Cardona & Holland-Moritz 2019

Phylum of incertae sedis bacterium

Vulcanimicrobiota is a monotypic phylum of incertae sedis bacteria. It has one valid class, Vulcanimicrobiia. Vulcanimicrobiota is one of the two valid bacterial phyla that does not belong to any kingdom, the other being Fidelibacterota.

== Phylogeny ==
The currently accepted taxonomy is based on the List of Prokaryotic names with Standing in Nomenclature (LPSN) and National Center for Biotechnology Information (NCBI).

120 marker proteins based GTDB 10-RS226

- - "Xenobia"
    - "Xenobiales"
      - "Xenobiaceae"
        - "Ca. Bruticola" Ji et al. 2021
        - "Ca. Xenobium" Ji et al. 2021
  - Vulcanimicrobiia
    - "Eremiobacterales"
      - "Eremiobacteraceae"
        - "Ca. Eremiobacter" Ji et al. 2017
        - "Ca. Mawsoniella" Ji et al. 2021
    - Vulcanimicrobiales
      - Vulcanimicrobiaceae
        - - - "Ca. Nyctobacter" Ji et al. 2021
            - "Ca. Palsibacter" Ji et al. 2021
          - - "Ca. Tityobacter" Ji et al. 2021
            - - "Ca. Hesperobacter" Ji et al. 2021
              - - "Ca. Cryoxeromicrobium" Ji et al. 2021
                - - "Ca. Erobacter" Ji et al. 2021
                  - "Ca. Zemynaea" Ji et al. 2021 non Bowman 2023
        - - - "Ca. Velthaea" Ji et al. 2021
            - - "Ca. Lustribacter" Ji et al. 2021
              - Vulcanimicrobium Yabe et al. 2023
          - - "Ca. Meridianibacter" Ji et al. 2021
            - - "Ca. Rubrimentiphilum" Sheremet et al. 2020
              - - "Ca. Aquilonibacter" Ji et al. 2021
                - - "Ca. Hemerobacter" Ji et al. 2021
                  - - "Ca. Tyrphobacter" Ji et al. 2021
                    - - "Ca. Tumulicola" Ji et al. 2021
                      - "Ca. Cybelea" Ji et al. 2021

- Class "Eudoremicrobiia" (sic) Paoli et al. 2022
  - Order "Eudoremicrobiales" (sic) Paoli et al. 2022
    - Family "Eudoromicrobiaceae" Paoli et al. 2022
      - ?"Ca. Autonomicrobium" Paoli et al. 2022
      - ?"Ca. Lamibacter" Pessi et al. 2024
      - ?"Ca. Amphithomicrobium" Paoli et al. 2022
      - ?"Ca. Eudoromicrobium" Paoli et al. 2022
- Class "Xenobia" Ji et al. 2021 (UBP9)
  - Order "Xenobiales" Ji et al. 2021
    - Family "Xenobiaceae" Ji et al. 2021
- Class Vulcanimicrobiia Yabe et al. 2024 (WPS2)
  - Order "Eremiobacterales" Ward, Cardona & Holland-Moritz 2019
    - Family "Eremiobacteraceae" Ji et al. 2021
  - Order Vulcanimicrobiales Yabe et al. 2024 ("Baltobacterales"; "Palusbacterales"; "Rubrimentiphilales")
    - Family Vulcanimicrobiaceae Yabe et al. 2024 ("Baltobacteraceae"; "Palusbacteraceae")
      - ?"Ca. Baltobacter" Ward, Cardona & Holland-Moritz 2019 ["Ca. Palusbacter" Ward, Cardona & Holland-Moritz 2019]

== Notes ==
- List of Bacteria genera
- List of bacterial orders
