= Thiohalobacter =

Scientific classification
- Domain: Bacteria
- Kingdom: Pseudomonadati
- Phylum: Pseudomonadota
- Class: Gammaproteobacteria
- Order: Thiohalobacterales; Sorokin and Merkel 2023
- Family: Thiohalobacteraceae; Sorokin and Merkel 2023
- Genus: Thiohalobacter; Sorokin et al. 2010
- Species: T. thiocyanaticus

Binomial name
- Thiohalobacter thiocyanaticus Sorokin et al. 2010

Genus of bacteria

Sedimenticola is a moderately halophilic and obligately chemolithoautotrophic, genus of bacteria from the class Gammaproteobacteria with one known species, Thiohalobacter thiocyanaticus. Thiohalobacter thiocyanaticus has been isolated from sediments from hypersaline lakes from the Kulunda Steppe in Russia.
