= Aerophobota =

Scientific classification (Candidatus)
- Domain: Bacteria
- Phylum: "Aerophobota" corrig. Rinke et al., 2013

Class
- "Aerophobia"

Synonyms
- "Candidatus Aerophobetes"; candidate division CD12

Deep-sea methane cycling bacteria

Aerophobota is a candidate bacterial phylum within the domain Bacteria. This phylum is found mainly in deep-sea, hydrocarbon-rich sediments, especially those associated with methane hydrates. Aerophobota is notable for its likely involvement in organic carbon and methane cycling in anoxic, deep ocean sediment environments.

== Taxonomy ==
The classification is based on genomic and metagenomic data without cultured isolates, and the name is not yet validly published under formal bacterial nomenclature.

- Class "Aerophobia" Chuvochina et al. 2023
  - Order "Aerophobales" Chuvochina et al. 2023
    - Family "Aerophobaceae" Chuvochina et al. 2023
      - Genus "Candidatus Aerophobus" Rinke et al. 2013
        - Species "Ca. A. profundus" Rinke et al. 2013

== Ecology and function ==
Aerophobetes are abundant in hydrate-containing, silty sediment layers beneath the ocean floor and thrive in anoxic (oxygen-free) conditions. Genetic analyses suggest they ferment organic matter, producing hydrogen and acetate, which can then be used by syntrophic methanogenic archaea to generate methane. These metabolic interactions indicate Aerophobota's likely contribution to methane formation and carbon cycling in deep-sea ecosystems.

== Environmental and biotechnological importance ==
Research into Aerophobota and its functional roles is of interest because methane is a potent greenhouse gas. Understanding these microbes could inform strategies for mitigating methane emissions from seafloor hydrates.
