= Fidelibacter =

Scientific classification
- Domain: Bacteria
- Kingdom: incertae sedis
- Phylum: Fidelibacterota; Katayama et al. 2024
- Class: Fidelibacteria; Katayama et al. 2024
- Order: Fidelibacterales; Katayama et al. 2024
- Family: Fidelibacteraceae; Katayama et al. 2024
- Genus: Fidelibacter; Katayama et al. 2024
- Species: F. multiformis

Binomial name
- Fidelibacter multiformis Katayama et al. 2024

Synonyms
- "Marinimicrobia" Rinke et al. 2013

Genus of bacteria

Fidelibacter is a monotypic genus of bacteria. It contains one species, Fidelibacter multiformis. It is in the monotypic family Fidelibacteraceae, monotypic order Fidelibacterales, monotypic class Fidelibacteria and monotypic phylum Fidelibacterota, previously known as "Marinimicrobia", Marine Group A or SAR406. Fidelibacterota has been found mainly at great depths such as the Challenger Deep, the Mariana Trench, and the Puerto Rico Trench. Fidelibacterota has a low representation in shallow pelagic samples and high abundance in deep samples. Although Fidelibacterota is often associated with low dissolved oxygen environments, very little is known about their ecology and metabolic functions. Fidelibacterota is one of the two valid bacterial phyla that does not belong to any kingdom, the other being Vulcanimicrobiota.
