= Acidiferrobacteraceae =

Scientific classification
- Domain: Bacteria
- Kingdom: Pseudomonadati
- Phylum: Pseudomonadota
- Class: Gammaproteobacteria
- Order: Acidiferrobacterales; Kojima et al. 2015
- Family: Acidiferrobacteraceae; Kojima et al. 2015

Genera
- Acidiferrobacter Hallberg et al. 2011; Sulfuricaulis Kojima et al. 2016; Sulfurifustis Kojima et al. 2015

Family of bacteria

Acidiferrobacteraceae is a family of bacteria.
