= Thiohalorhabdus =

Scientific classification
- Domain: Bacteria
- Kingdom: Pseudomonadati
- Phylum: Pseudomonadota
- Class: Gammaproteobacteria
- Order: Thiohalorhabdales; Sorokin and Merkel 2023
- Family: Thiohalorhabdaceae; Sorokin and Merkel 2023
- Genus: Thiohalorhabdus; Sorokin et al. 2008

Type species
- Thiohalorhabdus denitrificans Sorokin et al. 2008

Species
- Thiohalorhabdus denitrificans; Thiohalorhabdus methylotropha

Genus of bacteria

Thiohalorhabdus is a Gram-negative, extremely halophilic and non-motile genus of bacteria from the class Gammaproteobacteria. The type species, Thiohalorhabdus denitrificans, has been isolated from sediments from a hypersaline lake from Siberia in Russia.
