= Coprothermobacterales =

Scientific classification
- Domain: Bacteria
- Kingdom: Pseudomonadati
- Phylum: Coprothermobacterota
- Class: Coprothermobacteria
- Order: Coprothermobacterales; Pavan et al. 2018

Family
- Coprothermobacteraceae

Order of bacteria

Coprothermobacterales is a taxonomic order of thermophilic bacteria in the class Coprothermobacteria of the phylum Coprothermobacterota.

Its name derives from the type genus of this order, Coprothermobacter, with the ending suffix '-ales', to denote an order.

The bacteria of this order have a rod-shaped morphology, do not produce spores, are nonmotile, strictly anaerobic and, being thermophiles, grow at temperature ranges above 35 °C and below 70 °C, for a pH between 5.0 and 9.4. Moreover, these bacteria are chemoorganotrophs and proteolytic fermenters, which produce acetic acid, H_{2}, and CO_{2} as main end-products of fermentation.
