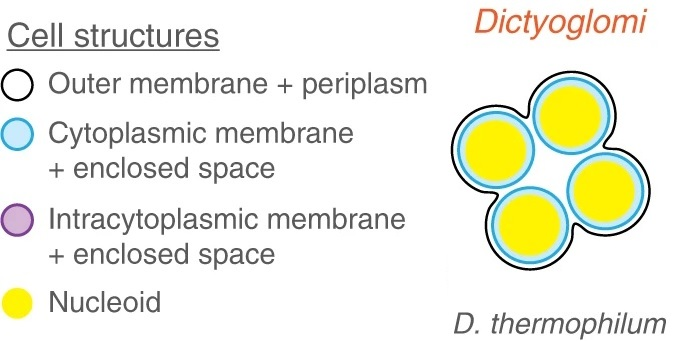

Scientific classification
- Domain: Bacteria
- Kingdom: Pseudomonadati
- Phylum: Dictyoglomerota; Patel 2021
- Class: Dictyoglomeria; Patel 2012
- Order: Dictyoglomerales; Patel 2012
- Family: Dictyoglomeraceae; Patel 2012
- Genus: Dictyoglomus; Saiki et al. 1985

Type species
- Dictyoglomus thermophilum Saiki et al. 1985

Other species
- D. turgidum corrig. Svetlichny and Svetlichnayá 1995

Synonyms
- Dictyoglomota: "Dictyoglomaeota" Oren et al. 2015; "Dictyoglomi" Patel 2010; "Dictyoglomota" Whitman et al. 2018

= Dictyoglomus =

Genus of bacterium

Dictyoglomus is a genus of bacterium, given its own phylum, called the Dictyoglomerota. This organism is extremely thermophilic, meaning it thrives at extremely high temperatures. It is chemoorganotrophic, meaning it derives energy by metabolizing organic molecules. This organism is of interest because it elaborates an enzyme, xylanase, which digests xylan, a heteropolymer of the pentose sugar xylose. By pretreating wood pulp with this enzyme, paper manufacturers can achieve comparable levels of whiteness with much less chlorine bleach.

It has been described as gram-negative, with a triple-layered wall.
