= Coprothermobacteria =

Scientific classification
- Domain: Bacteria
- Kingdom: Pseudomonadati
- Phylum: Coprothermobacterota
- Class: Coprothermobacteria; Pavan et al. 2018

Order
- Coprothermobacterales

Class of bacteria

Coprothermobacteria is a taxonomic class of bacteria in the phylum Coprothermobacterota.

Currently, this class is represented by a single order of bacteria, with only one family to which belongs a genus (Coprothermobacter) of non-motile, rod-shaped microorganisms that stain Gram-negative, are non-spore-forming, strictly anaerobic, thermophilic and chemoautotroph.
