= Rubrobacteria =

Scientific classification
- Domain: Bacteria
- Kingdom: Bacillati
- Phylum: Actinomycetota
- Class: Rubrobacteria; Suzuki 2013

Order
- Rubrobacterales

Synonyms
- Rubrobacteridae Rainey et al. 1997; "Rubrobacterineae" Garrity & Holt 2001

Subclass of bacteria

Rubrobacteria is a class of Actinomycetota. The currently accepted taxonomy is based on the List of Prokaryotic names with Standing in Nomenclature (LPSN) and National Center for Biotechnology Information (NCBI).
