= Coprothermobacterota =

Scientific classification
- Domain: Bacteria
- Kingdom: Pseudomonadati
- Phylum: Coprothermobacterota; Pavan et al. 2021

Class
- Coprothermobacteria

Synonyms
- "Coprothermobacterota" Pavan et al. 2018

Phylum of bacteria

Coprothermobacterota is a phylum of nonmotile, rod-shaped bacteria.

Its members are strictly anaerobic and thermophilic, growing at optimal temperatures between 55 °C and 70 °C.

The name of this phylum is based on an early genus, dubbed "Coprothermobacter", a term whose etymology derives from the Greek words "kopros", meaning manure, and "thermos", warm, referring to the fact that these bacteria are capable of living at relatively high temperatures, with a maximum growth temperature of 75 °C.

== Notes ==
In October 2021, the name of this phylum has been accepted as validly published, according to the emendations of the rules of the International Code of Nomenclature of Prokaryotes proposed to include the rank of phylum.
