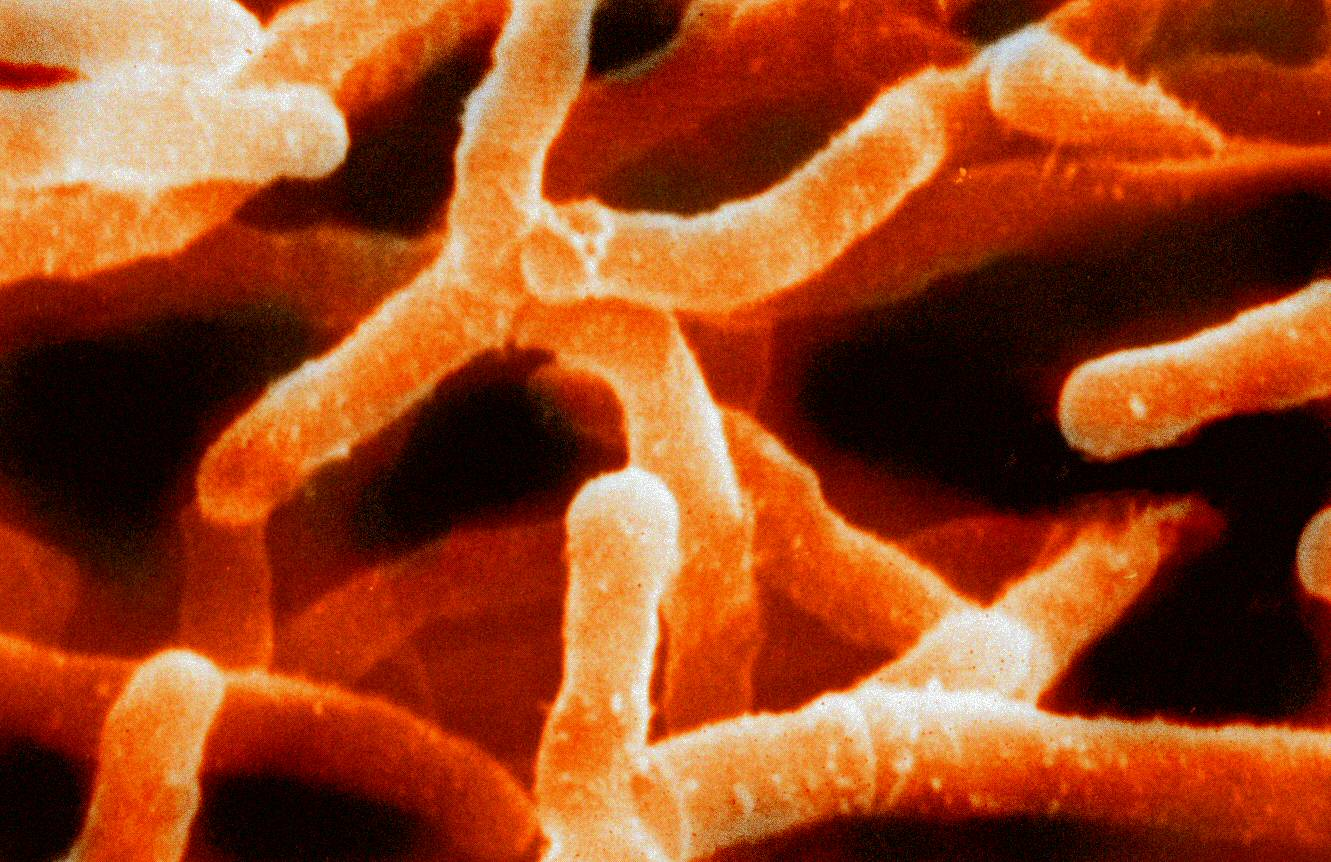
- Scanning electron micrograph of Actinomyces israelii (Actinomycetota)

Scientific classification
- Domain: Bacteria
- Kingdom: Bacillati (Gibbons & Murray 1978) Oren & Göker 2024

Type genus
- Bacillus Cohn 1872 (Approved Lists 1980)

Phyla
- Actinomycetota; Armatimonadota; Bacillota; Chloroflexota; Cyanobacteriota; Deinococcota; Minisyncoccota; Mycoplasmatota; "Sysuimicrobiota"; Vulcanimicrobiota

Synonyms
- "Glidobacteria" Cavalier-Smith, 2006 (excluding Actinomycetota and Bacillota); "Terrabacteria" Battistuzzi et al., 2004

= Bacillati =

Kingdom of land bacteria

Bacillati, is a kingdom containing approximately two-thirds of prokaryote species, including those in the gram positive phyla (Actinomycetota and Bacillota) as well as the phyla Cyanobacteriota and Chloroflexota. It was originally proposed under the name "Terrabacteria", referring to the commonalities of its members: the possession of important adaptations to life on land such as resistance to environmental hazards (e.g., desiccation, ultraviolet radiation, and high salinity) and oxygenic photosynthesis.

The unique properties of the cell wall in gram-positive taxa, which likely evolved in response to terrestrial conditions, have also contributed toward pathogenicity in many species. This suggests that terrestrial adaptations may have played a larger role in prokaryote evolution than currently understood.

The closest relatives of the Bacillati are the Pseudomonadati ("Hydrobacteria"), originally named in reference to the moist environment inferred for the common ancestor of those species. Bacillati and Pseudomonadati were inferred to have diverged approximately 3 billion years ago, suggesting that land (continents) had been colonized by prokaryotes at that time. Together, Bacillati and Pseudomonadati form a large clade containing 97% of prokaryotes and 99% of all species of Bacteria known by 2009.

== Taxonomic history ==
"Terrabacteria" (syn. Bacillati) was proposed in 2004 for Actinomycetota, Cyanobacteria, and Deinococcota and was expanded later to include Bacillota and Chloroflexota. Other phylogenetic analyses have supported the close relationships of these phyla. Most species of prokaryotes not placed in "Terrabacteria" were assigned to the taxon "Hydrobacteria". Some molecular phylogenetic analyses have not supported this dichotomy of Bacillati and Pseudomonadati, but the most recent genomic analyses, including those that have focused on rooting the tree, have found these two groups to be monophyletic.

In 2022, new rules were introduced for kingdom-level taxa of prokaryotes, and the same two authors who proposed those new rules, proposed new names in 2024. They concluded that “the taxonomically preferable solution for bacterial kingdoms seems to be to accept the subdivision apparent in the study by Battistuzzi and Hedges,” with refinement. The new (and only valid) name is kingdom Bacillati.

=== Other related proposals ===
The clade formed by Pseudomonadati and Bacillati has been named "Selabacteria", in allusion to their phototrophic abilities (σέλας "light" in Greek). Currently, the bacterial phyla that are outside of Bacillati + Pseudomonadati, and thus justifying the taxon "Selabacteria", are debated and may or may not include Fusobacteria.

Cavalier-Smith's "Glidobacteria" included some members of Bacillati but excluded the large gram positive groups, Bacillota and Actinomycetota, and is not supported by molecular phylogenetic data. Moreover, the article naming Glidobacteria did not include a molecular phylogeny or statistical analyses and did not follow the widely accepted three-domain system. For example, it claimed that eukaryotes split from Archaea very recently (~900 Mya), which is contradicted by the fossil record, and that lineage of eukaryotes + Archaea was nested within Bacteria as a close relative of Actinomycetota.

== Phylogeny ==
Molecular clock calibrated phylogeny of Battistuzzi and Hedges 2009.

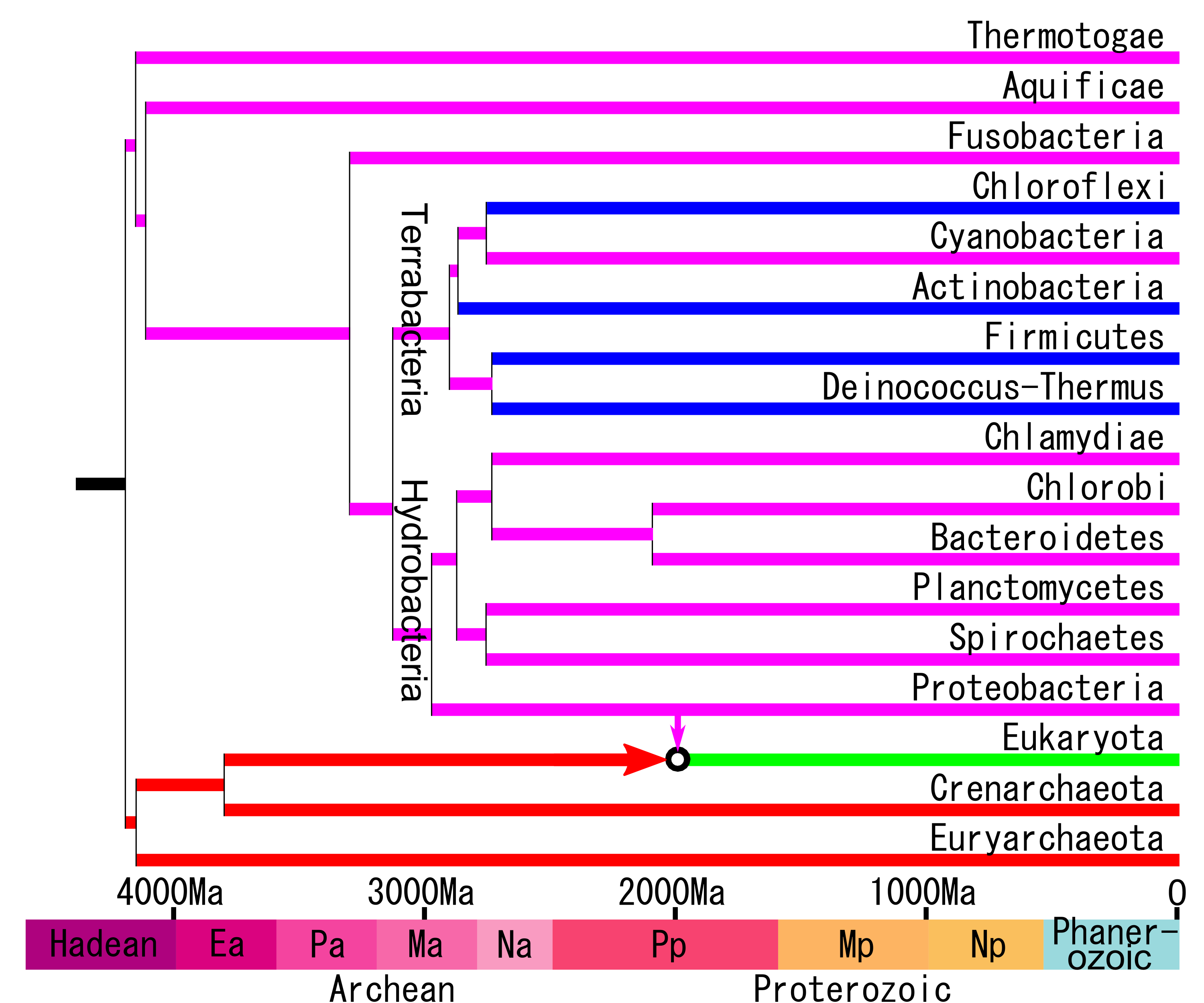

"

120 marker proteins based GTDB 11-RS232

- Bacteria
  - - Bacillati
      - - - "Sysuimicrobiota"
          - Deinococcota
        - - Chloroflexota [incl. "Dormibacterota"]
          - Minisyncoccota [incl. Candidate Phyla Radiation group]
      - - - Armatimonadota [incl. "Abditibacteriota"; "Fervidibacterota"]
          - Vulcanimicrobiota [incl. "Eremiobacterota"; "Palusbacterota"]
        - - Actinomycetota
          - Bacillota
  - - - Thermotogati
        - - - Dictyoglomota
            - Thermodesulfobiota
          - - Coprothermobacterota [incl. "Lithacetigenota"]
            - Caldisericota [incl. "Cryosericota"]
        - - Synergistota [incl. "Aminanaerobiota"]
          - - "Bipolaricaulota" [incl. "Acetithermota"; "Fraseribacteriota"]
            - Thermotogota
    - - - - Fusobacteriota {Fusobacteriati}
          - Erysipelotrichia {Mycoplasmatota}
        - - "Cyanoprokaryota"
            - "Margulisbacteria" [incl."Saganiibacteriota"]
            - Cyanobacteriota [incl. "Blackalliibacteriota" ; "Melainobacteriota"]
      - Pseudomonadati

Recent molecular analyses have found roughly the following relationships including other phyla, whose relationships were uncertain.

- Bacillati
  - DST
    - - Fusobacteriota (sometimes included in Gracilicutes)
      - - Synergistota
        - Coprothermobacterota
    - - Atribacterota
      - - - "Fervidibacteria"
          - - Dictyoglomota
            - Caldisericota
        - - Deinococcota
          - - - "Acetothermia"
              - Thermotogota
            - - "Calescamantes"
              - "Pyropristinus"
  - - - Aquificota (sometimes included in Gracilicutes)
      - "Cyanobacteriota/Melainabacteria group"
        - - "Margulisbacteria"
          - "Saganbacteria"
        - - "Sericytochromatia"
          - - Cyanobacteriota
            - "Melainobacteriota"
    - - - Bacillota (includes Mycoplasmatota)
        - Actinomycetota
      - - - "Dormibacteraeota"
          - Chloroflexota
        - - "Eremiobacteraeota"
          - - Armatimonadota
            - "Abditibacteriota"

On the other hand, Coleman et al. named the clade composed of Thermotogota, Deinococcota, Synergistota and related as DST and furthermore the analysis suggests that ultra-small bacteria (CPR group) may belong to Bacillati being more closely related to Chloroflexota. According to this study the phylum Aquificota sometimes included belongs to Pseudomonadati and that the phylum Fusobacteriota can belong to both Bacillati and Pseudomonadati. The result was the following:

- Bacillati
  - "DST"
  - - "Cyanobacteriota/Melainabacteria group"
    - - - Bacillota (includes Mycoplasmatota)
        - Actinomycetota
      - - - Armatimonadota
          - "Eremiobacteraeota"
        - - "CPR"
          - - "Dormibacteraeota"
            - Chloroflexota
