= Bacterial taxonomy =

Rank based classification of bacteria

The hierarchy of biological classification's eight major taxonomic ranks. Intermediate minor rankings are not shown.

Bacterial taxonomy is subfield of taxonomy devoted to the classification of bacteria specimens into taxonomic ranks. Archaeal taxonomy are governed by the same rules.

In the scientific classification established by Carl Linnaeus, each species is assigned to a genus resulting in a two-part name. This name denotes the two lowest levels in a hierarchy of ranks, increasingly larger groupings of species based on common traits. Of these ranks, domains are the most general level of categorization. Presently, scientists classify all life into just three domains, Eukaryotes, Bacteria and Archaea.

Bacterial taxonomy is the classification of strains within the domain Bacteria into hierarchies of similarity. This classification is similar to that of plants, mammals, and other taxonomies. However, biologists specializing in different areas have developed differing taxonomic conventions over time. For example, bacterial taxonomists name types based on descriptions of strains. Zoologists among others use a type specimen instead.

== Diversity ==
Bacteria (prokaryotes, together with Archaea) share many common features. These commonalities include the lack of a nuclear membrane, unicellularity, division by binary-fission and generally small size. The various species can be differentiated through the comparison of several characteristics, allowing their identification and classification. Examples include:

- Phylogeny: All bacteria stem from a common ancestor and diversified since, and consequently possess different levels of evolutionary relatedness (see Bacterial phyla and Timeline of evolution)
- Metabolism: Different bacteria may have different metabolic abilities (see Microbial metabolism)
- Environment: Different bacteria thrive in different environments, such as high/low temperature and salt (see Extremophiles)
- Morphology: There are many structural differences between bacteria, such as cell shape, Gram stain (number of lipid bilayers) or bilayer composition (see Bacterial cellular morphologies, Bacterial cell structure)

== History ==
=== First descriptions ===
Bacteria were first observed by Antonie van Leeuwenhoek in 1676, using a single-lens microscope of his own design. He did not distinguish bacteria as a separate type of microorganism, calling all microorganisms, including bacteria, protists, and microscopic animals, "animalcules". He published his observations in a series of letters to the Royal Society.

Early described genera of bacteria include Vibrio and Monas, by O. F. Müller (1773, 1786), then classified as Infusoria (however, many species before included in those genera are regarded today as protists, which are eukaryotes); Polyangium, by H. F. Link (1809), the first bacterium still recognized today; Serratia, by Bizio (1823); and Spirillum, Spirochaeta and Bacterium, by Ehrenberg (1838).

The term Bacterium, introduced as a genus by Ehrenberg in 1838, became a catch-all for rod-shaped cells.

=== Early formal classifications ===
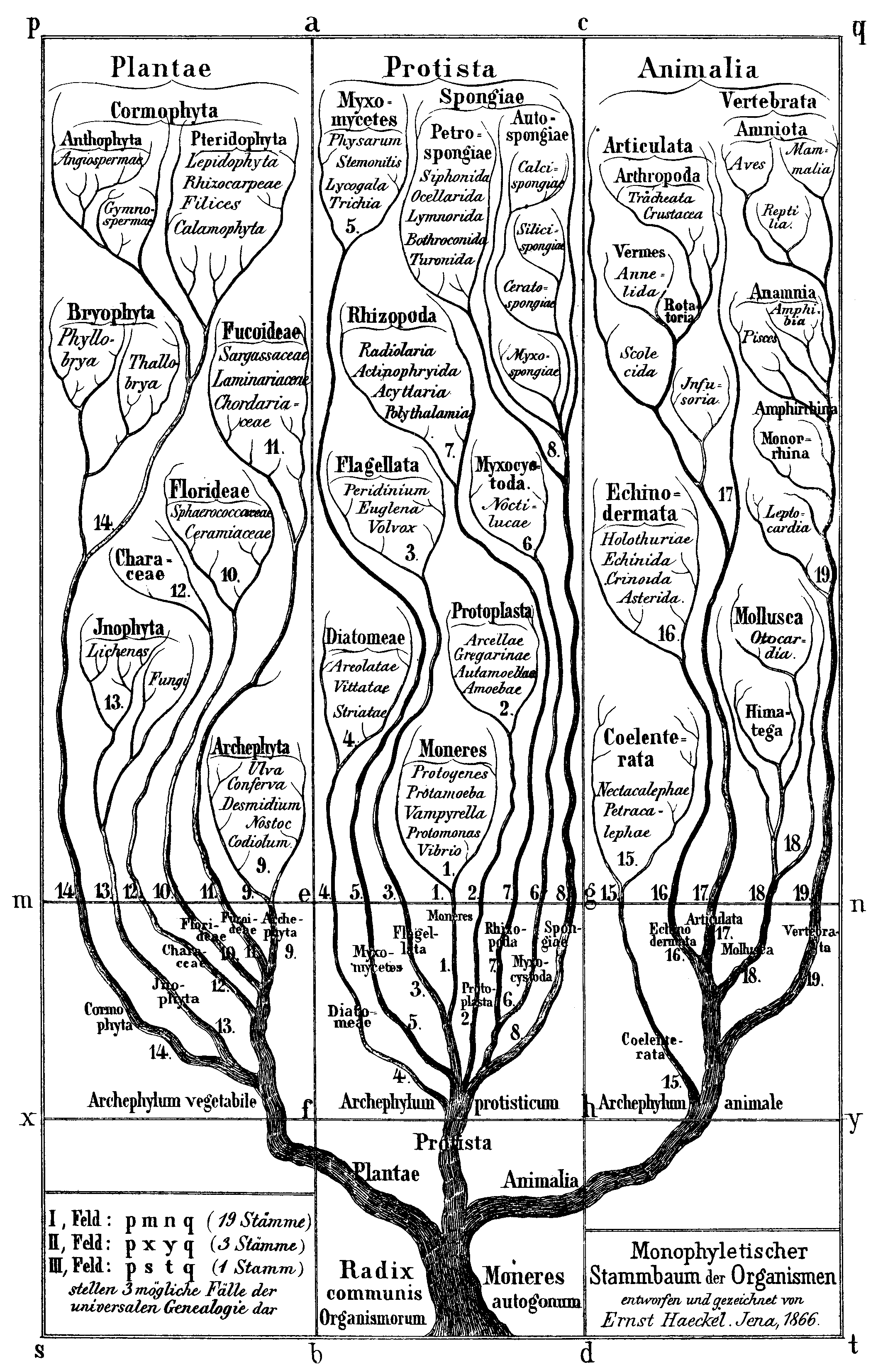
Tree of Life in Generelle Morphologie der Organismen (1866)

In 1857, bacteria were classified as plants constituting the class Schizomycetes, which along with the Schizophyceae (blue green algae/Cyanobacteria) formed the phylum Schizophyta.

Haeckel in 1866 placed the group in the phylum Moneres (from μονήρης: simple) in the kingdom Protista and defines them as completely structureless and homogeneous organisms, consisting only of a piece of plasma. He subdivided the phylum into two groups:

- die Gymnomoneren (no envelope)
  - Protogenes – such as Protogenes primordialis, now classed as a eukaryote and not a bacterium
  - Protamaeba – now classed as a eukaryote and not a bacterium
  - Vibrio – a genus of comma shaped bacteria first described in 1854
  - Bacterium – a genus of rod shaped bacteria first described in 1828, that later gave its name to the members of the Monera, formerly referred to as "a moneron" (plural "monera") in English and "eine Moneren"(fem. pl. "Moneres") in German
  - Bacillus – a genus of spore-forming rod shaped bacteria first described in 1835
  - Spirochaeta – thin spiral shaped bacteria first described in 1835
  - Spirillum – spiral shaped bacteria first described in 1832
  - etc.
- die Lepomoneren (with envelope)
  - Protomonas – now classed as a eukaryote and not a bacterium. The name was reused in 1984 for an unrelated genus of Bacteria
  - Vampyrella – now classed as a eukaryote and not a bacterium

The classification of Ferdinand Cohn (1872) was influential in the nineteenth century, and recognized six genera: Micrococcus, Bacterium, Bacillus, Vibrio, Spirillum, and Spirochaeta.

The group was later reclassified as the Prokaryotes by Chatton in 1925.

The classification of Cyanobacteria (colloquially "blue green algae") has been fought between being algae or bacteria (for example, Haeckel classified Nostoc in the phylum Archephyta of Algae).

in 1905, Erwin F. Smith accepted 33 valid different names of bacterial genera and over 150 invalid names, and Vuillemin, in a 1913 study, concluded that all species of the Bacteria should fall into the genera Planococcus, Streptococcus, Klebsiella, Merista, Planomerista, Neisseria, Sarcina, Planosarcina, Metabacterium, Clostridium, Serratia, Bacterium, and Spirillum.

in 1875, Cohn recognized four tribes: Spherobacteria, Microbacteria, Desmobacteria, and Spirobacteria. Stanier and van Neil in 1941 recognized the kingdom Monera with two phyla, Myxophyta and Schizomycetae, the latter comprising classes Eubacteriae (three orders), Myxobacteriae (one order), and Spirochetae (one order). In 1962, Bisset distinguished 1 class and 4 orders: Eubacteriales, Actinomycetales, Streptomycetales, and Flexibacteriales. Walter Migula's system (1897), which was the most widely accepted system of its time and included all then-known species but was based only on morphology, contained the three basic groups Coccaceae, Bacillaceae, and Spirillaceae, but also Trichobacterinae for filamentous bacteria. Orla-Jensen in 1909 established two orders: Cephalotrichinae (seven families) and Peritrichinae (presumably with only one family). Bergey et al. in 1925 presented a classification which generally followed the 1920 Final Report of the Society of American Bacteriologists Committee (Winslow et al.), which divided class Schizomycetes into four orders: Myxobacteriales, Thiobacteriales, Chlamydobacteriales, and Eubacteriales, with a fifth group being four genera considered intermediate between bacteria and protozoans: Spirocheta, Cristospira, Saprospira, and Treponema.

However, different authors often reclassified the genera due to the lack of visible traits to go by, resulting in a poor state which was summarised in 1915 by Robert Earle Buchanan. By then, the whole group received different ranks and names by different authors, namely:

- Schizomycetes (Naegeli 1857)
- Bacteriaceae (Cohn 1872 a)
- Bacteria (Cohn 1872 b)
- Schizomycetaceae (DeToni and Trevisan 1889)

Furthermore, the families into which the class was subdivided changed from author to author and for some, such as Zipf (1917), the names were in German and not in Latin.

The first edition of the Bacteriological Code in 1947 set a standardised system and authority for the classification of Bacteria.

A. R. Prévot's system (1958) had four subphyla and eight classes, as follows:

- Eubacteriales (classes Asporulales and Sporulales)
- Mycobacteriales (classes Actinomycetales, Myxobacteriales, and Azotobacteriales)
- Algobacteriales (classes Siderobacteriales and Thiobacteriales)
- Protozoobacteriales (class Spirochetales)

Linnaeus 1735	Haeckel 1866	Chatton 1925	Copeland 1938	Whittaker 1969	Woese et al. 1990	Cavalier-Smith 1998, 2015
2 kingdoms	3 kingdoms	2 empires	4 kingdoms	5 kingdoms	3 domains	2 empires, 6/7 kingdoms
(not treated)	Protista	Prokaryota	Monera	Monera	Bacteria	Bacteria
(not treated)	Protista	Prokaryota	Monera	Monera	Archaea	Archaea (2015)
(not treated)	Protista	Eukaryota	Protoctista	Protista	Eucarya	Protozoa*
(not treated)	Protista	Eukaryota	Protoctista	Protista	Eucarya	Chromista*
Vegetabilia	Plantae	Eukaryota	Plantae	Plantae	Eucarya	Plantae
Vegetabilia	Plantae	Eukaryota	Plantae	Fungi	Eucarya	Fungi
Animalia	Animalia	Eukaryota	Animalia	Animalia	Eucarya	Animalia	*Not a clade.

=== Informal groups based on Gram staining ===
Despite there being little agreement on the major subgroups of the Bacteria, Gram staining results were most commonly used as a classification tool. Consequently, until the advent of molecular phylogeny, the Kingdom Prokaryota was divided into four divisions, A classification scheme still formally followed by Bergey's manual of systematic bacteriology for tome order

- Gracilicutes (gram-negative)
  - Photobacteria (photosynthetic): class Oxyphotobacteriae (water as electron donor, includes the order Cyanobacteriales=blue-green algae, now phylum Cyanobacteria) and class Anoxyphotobacteriae (anaerobic phototrophs), orders: Rhodospirillales and Chlorobiales
  - Scotobacteria (non-photosynthetic, now the Proteobacteria and other gram-negative nonphotosynthetic phyla)
- Firmacutes [sic] (gram-positive, subsequently corrected to Firmicutes)
  - several orders such as Bacillales and Actinomycetales (now in the phylum Actinobacteria)
- Mollicutes (gram variable, e.g. Mycoplasma)
- Mendocutes (uneven gram stain, "methanogenic bacteria", now known as the Archaea)

=== Molecular era ===
==== "Archaic bacteria" and Woese's reclassification ====
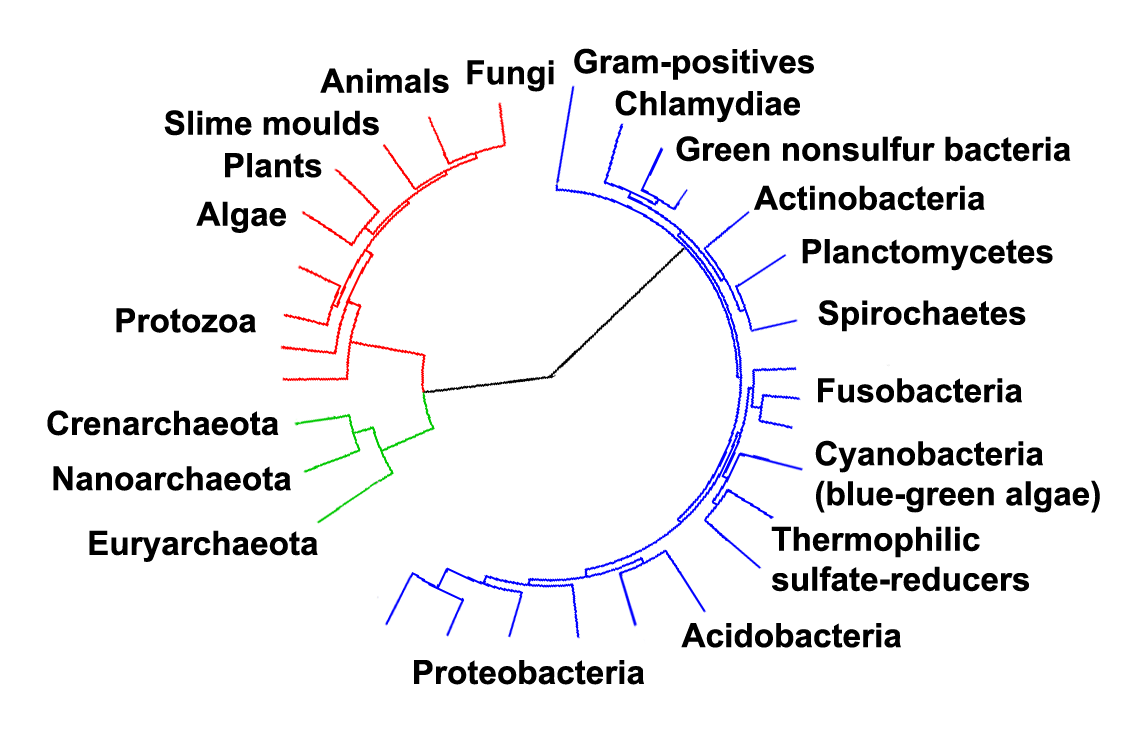
Phylogenetic tree showing the relationship between the archaea and other forms of life. Eukaryotes are colored red, archaea green and bacteria blue. Adapted from Ciccarelli et al.

Woese argued that the bacteria, archaea, and eukaryotes represent separate lines of descent that diverged early on from an ancestral colony of organisms. However, a few biologists argue that the Archaea and Eukaryota arose from a group of bacteria. In any case, it is thought that viruses and archaea began relationships approximately two billion years ago, and that co-evolution may have been occurring between members of these groups. It is possible that the last common ancestor of the bacteria and archaea was a thermophile, which raises the possibility that lower temperatures are "extreme environments" in archaeal terms, and organisms that live in cooler environments appeared only later. Since the Archaea and Bacteria are no more related to each other than they are to eukaryotes, the term prokaryote's only surviving meaning is "not a eukaryote", limiting its value.

With improved methodologies it became clear that the methanogenic bacteria were profoundly different and were (erroneously) believed to be relics of ancient bacteria thus Carl Woese, regarded as the forerunner of the molecular phylogeny revolution, identified three primary lines of descent: the Archaebacteria, the Eubacteria, and the Urkaryotes, the latter now represented by the nucleocytoplasmic component of the Eukaryotes. These lineages were formalised into the rank Domain (regio in Latin) which divided Life into 3 domains: the Eukaryota, the Archaea and the Bacteria.

In 2023, the Prokaryotic Code added the ranks of domain and kingdom to the prokaryotic nomenclature. The names of Bacteria and Archaea are validly-published taxa following Oren and Goker's publication that use these new rules.

==== Subdivisions ====
In 1987 Carl Woese divided the Eubacteria into 11 divisions based on 16S ribosomal RNA (SSU) sequences, which with several additions are still used today.

Oren and Goker has also validly published a number of kingdoms as a layer higher than the division/phylum:

- Domain Bacteria
  - Kingdom Bacillati (= divisions Firmicutes and 'Tenericutes', 'Terrabacteria', 'Terrabacterida', monoderms pro parte, subkingdom 'Unibacteria' pro parte)
  - Kingdom Fusobacteriati (= 'Fusobacterida')
  - Kingdom Pseudomonadati (= division Gracilicutes, 'Hydrobacteria', 'Hydrobacterida' and 'Aquificida', diderms, subkingdom 'Negibacteria')
  - Kingdom Thermotogati (= 'Thermotogida')
- Domain Archaea
  - Kingdom Methanobacteriati (= phylum 'Euryarchaeota' sensu lato, 'Euryarchaeida')
  - Kingdom Nanobdellati (= DPANN superphylum)
  - Kingdom Thermoproteati (= TACK superphylum, 'Crenarchaeida')
  - Kingdom Promethearchaeati (= Asgard, proposed by Imachi et al. later)

==== Opposition ====
While the three domain system is widely accepted, some authors have opposed it for various reasons.

One prominent scientist who opposed the three domain system was Thomas Cavalier-Smith, who proposed that the Archaea and the Eukaryotes (the Neomura) stem from Gram positive bacteria (Posibacteria), which in turn derive from gram negative bacteria (Negibacteria) based on several logical arguments, which are highly controversial and generally disregarded by the molecular biology community (c.f. reviewers' comments on, e.g. Eric Bapteste is "agnostic" regarding the conclusions) and are often not mentioned in reviews (e.g.) due to the subjective nature of the assumptions made.

However, despite there being a wealth of statistically supported studies towards the rooting of the tree of life between the Bacteria and the Neomura by means of a variety of methods, including some that are impervious to accelerated evolution—which is claimed by Cavalier-Smith to be the source of the supposed fallacy in molecular methods—there are a few studies which have drawn different conclusions, some of which place the root in the phylum Firmicutes with nested archaea.

Radhey Gupta's molecular taxonomy, based on conserved signature sequences of proteins, includes a monophyletic Gram negative clade, a monophyletic Gram positive clade, and a polyphyletic Archeota derived from Gram positives. Hori and Osawa's molecular analysis indicated a link between Metabacteria (=Archeota) and eukaryotes. The only cladistic analyses for bacteria based on classical evidence largely corroborate Gupta's results (see comprehensive mega-taxonomy).

James Lake presented a 2 primary kingdom arrangement (Parkaryotae + eukaryotes and eocytes + Karyotae) and suggested a 5 primary kingdom scheme (Eukaryota, Eocyta, Methanobacteria, Halobacteria, and Eubacteria) based on ribosomal structure and a 4 primary kingdom scheme (Eukaryota, Eocyta, Methanobacteria, and Photocyta), bacteria being classified according to 3 major biochemical innovations: photosynthesis (Photocyta), methanogenesis (Methanobacteria), and sulfur respiration (Eocyta). He has also discovered evidence that Gram-negative bacteria arose from a symbiosis between 2 Gram-positive bacteria.

== Authorities ==
Classification is the grouping of organisms into progressively more inclusive groups based on phylogeny and phenotype, while nomenclature is the application of formal rules for naming organisms.

=== Nomenclature authority ===
Despite there being no official and complete classification of prokaryotes, the names (nomenclature) given to prokaryotes are regulated by the International Code of Nomenclature of Prokaryotes (Prokaryotic Code), a book which contains general considerations, principles, rules, and various notes, and advises in a similar fashion to the nomenclature codes of other groups.

=== Classification authorities ===
As taxa proliferated, computer aided taxonomic systems were developed. Early non networked identification software entering widespread use was produced by Edwards 1978, Kellogg 1979, Schindler, Duben, and Lysenko 1979, Beers and Lockhard 1962, Gyllenberg 1965, Holmes and Hill 1985, Lapage et al 1970 and Lapage et al 1973.

Today the taxa which have been correctly described are reviewed in Bergey's manual of Systematic Bacteriology, which aims to aid in the identification of species and is considered the highest authority. An online version of the taxonomic outline of bacteria and archaea (TOBA) is available .

List of Prokaryotic names with Standing in Nomenclature (LPSN) is an online database based on the International Code of Nomenclature of Prokaryotes which currently contains over two thousand accepted names with their references, etymologies and various notes.

=== Description of new species ===
The International Journal of Systematic Bacteriology/International Journal of Systematic and Evolutionary Microbiology (IJSB/IJSEM) is a peer reviewed journal which acts as the official international forum for the publication of new prokaryotic taxa. If a species is published in a different peer review journal, the author can submit a request to IJSEM with the appropriate description, which if correct, the new species will be featured in the Validation List of IJSEM.

=== Distribution ===
Microbial culture collections are depositories of strains which aim to safeguard them and to distribute them. The main ones being:

Collection Initialism	Name	Location
ATCC	American Type Culture Collection	Manassas, Virginia
NCTC	National Collection of Type Cultures	Public Health England, United Kingdom
BCCM	Belgium Coordinated Collection of Microorganisms	Ghent, Belgium
CIP	Collection d'Institut Pasteur	Paris, France
DSMZ	Deutsche Sammlung von Mikroorganismen und Zellkulturen	Braunschweig, Germany
JCM	Japan Collection of Microorganisms	Saitama, Japan
NCCB	Netherlands Culture Collection of Bacteria	Utrecht, Netherlands
NCIMB	National Collection of Industrial, Food and Marine Bacteria	Aberdeen, Scotland
ICMP	International Collection of Microorganisms from Plants	Auckland, New Zealand
TBRC	Thailand Bioresource Research Center	Pathumthani, Thailand
CECT	Spanish Type Culture Collection	Valencia, Spain

=== Alternative systems ===
A few other nomenclatural systems have been proposed to correct for perceived shortcomings in the Prokaryotic Code system:

- SeqCode is a separate set of rules that govern prokaryotic nomenclature. Instead of using cultured strains as type material, it uses genome sequences. The SeqCode organization maintains its own database of names.
- GTDB is a computer database that gives a prokaryotic nomenclature based on marker-gene phylogeny and its own rules. Some of its results have been adapted into the Prokaryotic Code and SeqCode systems.

These following systems provide a taxonomy database under more ad hoc rules:

- The GenBank taxonomy browser includes all taxa that were used in GenBank submissions, with significant changes made by the curator. It's not limited to prokaryotes.
- 'The All-Species Living Tree' Project (SILVA LTP) provides a database of 16S rRNA sequences annotated with its own type of taxonomy. Ribosomal database project (RDP) is a similar project.
- Greengenes is a system that combines the Web of Life phylogeny with 16S data and names from GTDB and LTP, as of version 2. It offers the 16S V4 region sequences with their placement in the tree.
- Open Tree of Life aims to be phylogenetic and is not limited to prokaryotes.

== Analyses ==
Bacteria were at first classified based solely on their shape (vibrio, bacillus, coccus etc.), presence of endospores, gram stain, aerobic conditions and motility. This system changed with the study of metabolic phenotypes, where metabolic characteristics were used. Recently, with the advent of molecular phylogeny, several genes are used to identify species, the most important of which is the 16S rRNA gene, followed by 23S, ITS region, gyrB and others to confirm a better resolution. The quickest way to identify to match an isolated strain to a species or genus today is done by amplifying its 16S gene with universal primers and sequence the 1.4kb amplicon and submit it to a specialised web-based identification database, namely either Ribosomal Database Project, which align the sequence to other 16S sequences using infernal, a secondary structure bases global alignment, or ARB SILVA, which aligns sequences via SINA (SILVA incremental aligner), which does a local alignment of a seed and extends it .

Several identification methods exists:

- Phenotypic analyses
  - fatty acid analyses
  - Growth conditions (agar plates, Biolog multiwell plates)
- Genetic analyses
  - DNA–DNA hybridization
  - DNA profiling
  - Sequence
  - GC ratios
- Phylogenetic analyses
  - 16S-based phylogeny
  - phylogeny based on other genes
  - Multi-gene sequence analysis
  - Whole-genome sequence based analysis

== New species ==
The minimal standards for describing a new species depend on which group the species belongs to. c.f.

== Candidatus ==
Candidatus is a component of the taxonomic name for a bacterium that cannot be maintained in a Bacteriology Culture Collection. It is an interim taxonomic status for noncultivable organisms. e.g. "Candidatus Pelagibacter ubique"

== Species concept ==
Bacteria divide asexually and for the most part do not show regionalisms ("Everything is everywhere"), therefore the concept of species, which works best for animals, becomes entirely a matter of judgment.

The number of named species of bacteria and archaea (approximately 21,000) is surprisingly small considering their early evolution, genetic diversity and residence in all ecosystems. The reason for this is the differences in species concepts between the bacteria and macro-organisms, the difficulties in growing/characterising in pure culture (a prerequisite to naming new species, vide supra) and extensive horizontal gene transfer blurring the distinction of species.

The most commonly accepted definition is the polyphasic species definition, which takes into account both phenotypic and genetic differences. However, a quicker diagnostic ad hoc method to use a purely genetic approach, including any one of:

- Less than 97% 16S DNA sequence identity. 16S and the larger ribosomal DNA operon is routinely sequenced. There are relatively conserved parts from which broadly applicable PCR primers can be constructed. The 97% threshold have proven too loose compared to DDH and ANI. A new suggested value is 98.65%. More expensive comparisons such as DDH can be omitted if the 16S similarity is low enough for two strains to obviously not be the same species. Several extreme cases where two very different genomes share 99.9% 16S identity has been reported.
- DNA–DNA hybridisation (DDH), where less than 70% is considered different enough to be different species. This method depends on the interaction between whole genomic DNA molecules and does not require sequencing. It is labor-intensive and error-prone, at least until a microplate method was introduced. It is considered an important piece of taxonomic evidence as of 2013.
- Average nucleotide identity (ANI) and alignment fraction (AF) describe the similarity between two genome sequences. In one definition that makes use of these metrics, two genomes are said to be in the same species if ANI ≥96.5% and AF ≥60%. The ANI threshold is based on an observed discontinuity in ANI distributions among bacteria, where a large gap appears between intraspecific and interspecific comparisons. However, the gap does not necessarily appear at the same location for all combinations of bacterial genera and ANI methods. ANI has been accepted as taxonomic evidence in place of DDH.
- "Digital DDH" (dDDH) is similar to ANI and AF in principle, but it is tuned to produce a single value comparable to wet-lab DDH percentage. The species threshold is, as in DDH, 70%. It has been accepted as taxonomic evidence in place of DDH.

It has been noted that if the 70% DDH threshold were applied to animal classification, the order primates would be a single species. For this reason, more stringent species definitions based on whole genome sequences have been proposed. Specifically, Wright et al. (2018) goes beyond ANI and AF to propose defining species as a group in which the maximum distance between any two members is less than the minimum distance with any outsider. This criterion can be put on top of ANI+AF without introducing too many splits.

== Pathology vs. phylogeny ==
Ideally, taxonomic classification should reflect the evolutionary history of the taxa, i.e. the phylogeny. Although some exceptions are present when the phenotype differs amongst the group, especially from a medical standpoint. Some examples of problematic classifications follow.

=== Escherichia coli: overly large and polyphyletic ===
In the family Enterobacteriaceae of the class Gammaproteobacteria, the species in the genus Shigella (S. dysenteriae, S. flexneri, S. boydii, S. sonnei) from an evolutionary point of view are strains of the species Escherichia coli (polyphyletic), but due to genetic differences, cause different medical conditions in the case of the pathogenic strains. Confusingly, there are also E. coli strains that produce Shiga toxin known as STEC.

The new average nucleotide identity (ANI) criterion, as used by GTDB, groups most samples (including Shigella) into one species, but spreads the rest in five species. A definition using the biological species concept (specifically, presence of recombination) found that all but 12 genomes tagged as E. coli in GenBank fall into one "species", with the lowest strain-to-strain ANI being 94%.

=== Bacillus cereus group: close and polyphyletic ===
In a similar way, the Bacillus species (=phylum Firmicutes) belonging to the "B. cereus group" (B. anthracis, B. cereus, B . thuringiensis, B. mycoides, B. pseudomycoides, B. weihenstephanensis and B. medusa) have 99-100% similar 16S rRNA sequence (97% is a commonly cited adequate species cut-off) and are polyphyletic, but for medical reasons (anthrax etc.) remain separate.

The new ANI criterion provides some support for members of this group as separate species.

=== Yersinia pestis: extremely recent species ===
Yersinia pestis is in effect a strain of Yersinia pseudotuberculosis, but with a pathogenicity island that confers a drastically different pathology (Black plague and tuberculosis-like symptoms respectively) which arose 15,000 to 20,000 years ago.

=== Nested genera in Pseudomonas ===
In the gammaproteobacterial order Pseudomonadales, the genus Azotobacter and the species Azomonas macrocytogenes are actually members of the genus Pseudomonas, but were misclassified due to nitrogen fixing capabilities and the large size of the genus Pseudomonas which renders classification problematic. This will probably rectified in the close future.

=== Nested genera in Bacillus ===
Another example of a large genus with nested genera is the genus Bacillus, in which the genera Paenibacillus and Brevibacillus are nested clades.

By 2020 there was enough genomic data to resolve Bacillus and split out 23 genera. However, even this was insufficient to make Bacillus monophyletic, because microbiologists do not want to move the pathogenic Bacillus cereus group out of the genus yet. B. cereus is separated from the type species B. subtilis by many genus-sized clades, many of which have been made into formal genera.

=== Agrobacterium: resistance to name change ===
Based on molecular data it was shown that the genus Agrobacterium is nested in Rhizobium and the Agrobacterium species transferred to the genus Rhizobium (resulting in the following comp. nov.: Rhizobium radiobacter (formerly known as A. tumefaciens), R. rhizogenes, R. rubi, R. undicola and R. vitis) Given the plant pathogenic nature of Agrobacterium species, it was proposed to maintain the genus Agrobacterium and the latter was counter-argued.

The problem was resolved in the 2010s by the reinstatement of Agrobacterium via splitting genera, after Rhizobium was also split a few times. The genus Agrobacterium is to only include the clade clustered around the type species Agrobacterium radiobacter, with a clear synapomorphy in the form of the protelomerase telA gene.

=== Other examples of name-change resistance ===
- Gupta et al. 2018a proposed to split the largely monophyletic but arguably rather large Mycobacterium into five genera. The medical community opposed this change. Either taxonomic opinion can be considered valid, according to LPSN, as the Gupta names appeared in Validation List 181. The LPSN/LoRN deems the most of the valid new mycobacterial names " (and not recommended for medical use)" in the website's taxonomic opinion.
- The heavily polyphyletic Mycoplasma was split into six genera in three families by Gupta et al. 2018b. The changes were made valid in Validation List 184. Medical researchers firmly opposed the renaming and seek to have the ICSP reject the new names, but the ICSP Judicial Commission did not grant this request. (As with the above case, the older names remain validly published, so it is still acceptable to use these names under the Prokaryotic Code.) The LPSN/LoRN deems the most of the valid new mycoplasmal names "correct name (and explicitly explicit for medical use)" in the website's own taxonomic opinion.

=== Efforts to mitigate impact on medicine ===
==== Lists of taxonomic changes in pathogenic bacteria ====
There are lists of changes to taxonomic bacteria that medical practitioners can use.

- The journal Diagnostic Microbiology and Infectious Disease published five lists of taxonomic changes in bacteria of medical importance spanning the period 2013–2020.
- The Journal of Clinical Microbiology publishes a series of regular updates for isolates derived from human clinical specimens (mainly for human medicine) and another series for isolates derived from domestic animals (mainly for animal medicine). These lists include new taxa as well as revisions in taxonomy. A list for the previous year is usually published near the end of the current year; for example, the December 2024 updates covered changes in 2023.

==== Ad Hoc Committee on Mitigating Changes in Prokaryotic Nomenclature ====
A number of bacteriologists involved in the ICSP have formed an Ad Hoc Committee on Mitigating Changes in Prokaryotic Nomenclature. Among other initiatives, the committee produces a List of Recommended Names for bacteria of medical importance (LoRN), which delays the acceptance of name changes as "correct" for the medical world to adjust and catch up. A description of the mechanism can be found in LPSN and so is the list itself. As of June 2025, the oldest suspended names on the list are from 2020: Lacticaseibacillus rhamnosus and Niallia circulans.

The ad hoc committee claims to take a "parataxonomic" approach, an approach that is fully compatible with the Prokaryotic Code and balanced between "antitaxonomic" (overly conservative) and "hypertaxonomic" (overly phylogenetic and splitting) views. The ad hoc committee and its LoRN decides the choice of correct name on LPSN, some of which is marked "specifically recommended for medical use". Besides suspending a new name or changing the taxonomic opinion of LPSN in some other way, the ad hoc committee can also petition the ICSP Judicial Committee to permanently decline a proposal by marking the names within as rejected names. The ad hoc committee technically has no direct influence on the validation of names or the decisions of the Judicial Committee, but many of its members sit on the editorial board of IJSEM, have participated in authoring a Validation List, or have written a Judicial Opinion.

An example of a valid name being set aside is Borreliella Adeolu and Gupta 2015, which is extremely unpopular among Borrelia researchers. A request to reject Borreliella from 2015 was declined by the Judicial Committee.

== Nomenclature ==
Taxonomic names are written in italics (or underlined when handwritten) with a majuscule first letter with the exception of epithets for species and subspecies. Despite it being common in zoology, tautonyms (e.g. Bison bison) are not acceptable and names of taxa used in zoology, botany or mycology cannot be reused for Bacteria (Botany and Zoology do share names).

Nomenclature is the set of rules and conventions which govern the names of taxa. The difference in nomenclature between the various kingdoms/domains is reviewed in.

For Bacteria, valid names must have a Latin or Neolatin name and can only use basic latin letters (w and j inclusive, see History of the Latin alphabet for these), consequently hyphens, accents and other letters are not accepted and should be transliterated correctly (e.g. ß=ss). Ancient Greek being written in the Greek alphabet, needs to be transliterated into the Latin alphabet.

When compound words are created, a connecting vowel is needed depending on the origin of the preceding word, regardless of the word that follows, unless the latter starts with a vowel in which case no connecting vowel is added. If the first compound is Latin then the connecting vowel is an -i-, whereas if the first compound is Greek, the connecting vowel is an -o-.

For etymologies of names consult LPSN.

=== Rules for higher taxa ===
For the Prokaryotes (Bacteria and Archaea) the rank kingdom has not been used till 2024 (although some authors referred to phyla as kingdoms). The category of kingdom was included into the Bacteriological Code in November 2023, the first four proposals (Bacillati, Fusobacteriati, Pseudomonadati, Thermotogati) were validly published in January 2024.

If a new or amended species is placed in new ranks, according to Rule 9 of the Bacteriological Code the name is formed by the addition of an appropriate suffix to the stem of the name of the type genus. For subclass and class the recommendation from is generally followed, resulting in a neutral plural, however a few names do not follow this and instead keep into account graeco-latin grammar (e.g. the female plurals Thermotogae, Aquificae and Chlamydiae, the male plurals Chloroflexi, Bacilli and Deinococci and the greek plurals Spirochaetes, Gemmatimonadetes and Chrysiogenetes).

Rank	Suffix	Example
Genus		Elusimicrobium
Subtribe (disused)	-inae	(Elusimicrobiinae)
Tribe (disused)	-eae	(Elusimicrobiieae)
Subfamily	-oideae	(Elusimicrobioideae)
Family	-aceae	Elusimicrobiaceae
Suborder	-ineae	(Elusimicrobineae)
Order	-ales	Elusimicrobiales
Subclass	-idae	(Elusimicrobidae)
Class	-ia	Elusimicrobia
Phylum	-ota	Elusimicrobiota
Kingdom	-ati	Elusimicrobiati

=== Phyla endings ===
Until 2021, phyla were not covered by the Bacteriological code, so they were named informally. This resulted in a variety of approaches to naming phyla. Some phyla, like Firmicutes, were named according to features shared across the phylum. Others, like Chlamydiae, were named using a class name or genus name as the stem (e.g., Chlamydia). In 2021, the decision was made to include names under the Bacteriological Code. Consequently, many phylum names were updated according to the new nomenclatural rules. The higher taxa proposed by Cavalier-Smith are generally disregarded by the molecular phylogeny community (e.g.) (vide supra).

Under the new rules, the name of a phylum is derived from the type genus:

- Acidobacteriota (from Acidobacterium)
- Actinomycetota (from Actinomyces)
- Aquificota (from Aquifex)
- Armatimonadota (from Armatimonas)
- Atribacterota (from Atribacter)
- Bacillota (from Bacillus)
- Bacteroidota (from Bacteroides)
- Balneolota (from Balneola)
- Bdellovibrionota (from Bdellovibrio)
- Caldifarciminota (from Caldifarcimen)
- Caldisericota (from Caldisericum)
- Calditrichota (from Caldithrix)
- Campylobacterota (from Campylobacter)
- Chlamydiota (from Chlamydia)
- Chlorobiota (from Chlorobium)
- Chloroflexota (from Chloroflexus)
- Chrysiogenota (from Chrysiogenes)
- Coprothermobacterota (from Coprothermobacter)
- Deferribacterota (from Deferribacter)
- Deinococcota (from Deinococcus)
- Dictyoglomota (from Dictyoglomus)
- Elusimicrobiota (from Elusimicrobium)
- Fibrobacterota (from Fibrobacterota)
- Fusobacteriota (from Fusobacterium)
- Gemmatimonadota (from Gemmatimonas)
- Ignavibacteriota (from Ignavibacterium)
- Kiritimatiellota (from Kiritimatiella)
- Lentisphaerota (from Lentisphaera)
- Mycoplasmatota (from Mycoplasma)
- Myxococcota (from Myxococcus)
- Nitrospinota (from Nitrospina)
- Nitrospirota (from Nitrospira)
- Planctomycetota (from Planctomyces)
- Pseudomonadota (from Pseudomonas)
- Rhodothermota (from Rhodothermus)
- Spirochaetota (from Spirochaeta)
- Synergistota (from Synergistes)
- Thermodesulfobacteriota (from Thermodesulfobacterium)
- Thermomicrobiota (from Thermomicrobium)
- Thermotogota (from Thermotoga)
- Verrucomicrobiota (from Verrucomicrobium)

=== Names after people ===
Several species are named after people, either the discoverer or a famous person in the field of microbiology, for example Salmonella is after D.E. Salmon, who discovered it (albeit as "Bacillus typhi").

For the generic epithet, all names derived from people must be in the female nominative case, either by changing the ending to -a or to the diminutive -ella, depending on the name.

For the specific epithet, the names can be converted into either adjectival form (adding -nus (m.), -na (f.), -num (n.) according to the gender of the genus name) or the genitive of the Latinised name.

=== Names after places ===
Many species (the specific epithet) are named after the place they are present or found (e.g. Thiospirillum jenense). Their names are created by forming an adjective by joining the locality's name with the ending -ensis (m. or f.) or ense (n.) in agreement with the gender of the genus name, unless a classical Latin adjective exists for the place. However, names of places should not be used as nouns in the genitive case.

== Vernacular names ==
Despite the fact that some hetero/homogeneus colonies or biofilms of bacteria have names in English (e.g. dental plaque or star jelly), no bacterial species has a vernacular/trivial/common name in English.

For names in the singular form, plurals cannot be made (singulare tantum) as would imply multiple groups with the same label and not multiple members of that group (by analogy, in English, chairs and tables are types of furniture, which cannot be used in the plural form "furnitures" to describe both members), conversely names plural form are pluralia tantum. However, a partial exception to this is made by the use of vernacular names. However, to avoid repetition of taxonomic names which break the flow of prose, vernacular names of members of a genus or higher taxa are often used and recommended, these are formed by writing the name of the taxa in sentence case roman ("standard" in MS Office) type, therefore treating the proper noun as an English common noun (e.g. the salmonellas), although there is some debate about the grammar of plurals, which can either be regular plural by adding -(e)s (the salmonellas) or using the ancient Greek or Latin plural form (irregular plurals) of the noun (the salmonellae); the latter is problematic as the plural of - bacter would be -bacteres, while the plural of myces (N.L. masc. n. from Gr. masc. n. mukes) is mycetes.

Customs are present for certain names, such as those ending in -monas are converted into -monad (one pseudomonad, two aeromonads and not -monades).

Bacteria which are the etiological cause for a disease are often referred to by the disease name followed by a describing noun (bacterium, bacillus, coccus, agent or the name of their phylum) e.g. cholera bacterium (Vibrio cholerae) or Lyme disease spirochete (Borrelia burgdorferi), note also rickettsialpox (Rickettsia akari) (for more see).

Treponema is converted into treponeme and the plural is treponemes and not treponemata.

Some unusual bacteria and archaea have special names such as Quin's oval (Quinella ovalis) and Walsby's square (Haloquadratum walsbyi).

Before the advent of molecular phylogeny, many higher taxonomic groupings had only trivial names, which are still used today, some of which are polyphyletic, such as Rhizobacteria. Some higher taxonomic trivial names are:

- Blue-green algae are members of the phylum "Cyanobacteria"
- Green non-sulfur bacteria are members of the phylum Chloroflexota
- Green sulfur bacteria are members of the Chlorobiota
- Purple bacteria are some, but not all, members of the phylum Pseudomonadota
- Purple sulfur bacteria are members of the order Chromatiales
- low G+C Gram-positive bacteria are members of the phylum Bacillota, regardless of GC content
- high G+C Gram-positive bacteria are members of the phylum Actinomycetota, regardless of GC content
- Rhizobia are members of various genera of Pseudomonadota
- Lactic acid bacteria are members of the order Lactobacillales
- Coryneform bacteria are members of the family Corynebacteriaceae
- Fruiting gliding bacteria or myxobacteria are members of the phylum Myxococcota
- Enterics are members of the order Enterobacteriales (although the term is avoided if they do not live in the intestines, such as Pectobacterium)
- Acetic acid bacteria are members of the family Acetobacteraceae

== Terminology ==
- The abbreviation for species is sp. (plural spp.) and is used after a generic epithet to indicate a species of that genus. Often used to denote a strain of a genus for which the species is not known either because the organism has not been described yet as a species or insufficient tests were conducted to identify it. For example Halomonas sp. GFAJ-1 – see also open nomenclature
- If a bacterium is known and well-studied but not culturable, it is given the term Candidatus in its name
- A basonym is original name of a new combination, namely the first name given to a taxon before it was reclassified
- A synonym is an alternative name for a taxon, i.e. a taxon was erroneously described twice
- When a taxon is transferred it becomes a new combination (comb. nov.) or new name (nom. nov.)
- paraphyly, monophyly, and polyphyly

== See also ==
- Branching order of bacterial phyla (Woese, 1987)
- Branching order of bacterial phyla (Gupta, 2001)
- Branching order of bacterial phyla (Cavalier-Smith, 2002)
- Branching order of bacterial phyla (Rappe and Giovanoni, 2003)
- Branching order of bacterial phyla (Battistuzzi et al., 2004)
- Branching order of bacterial phyla (Ciccarelli et al., 2006)
- Branching order of bacterial phyla after ARB Silva Living Tree
- Branching order of bacterial phyla (Genome Taxonomy Database, 2018)
- Bacterial phyla, a complicated classification
- List of archaea genera
- List of bacteria genera
- List of bacterial orders
- List of Latin and Greek words commonly used in systematic names
- List of sequenced archaeal genomes
- List of sequenced prokaryotic genomes
- List of clinically important bacteria
- Species problem
- Evolutionary grade
- Cryptic species complex
- Synonym (taxonomy)
- Taxonomy
- LPSN, list of accepted bacterial and archaeal names
- Cyanobacteria, a phylum of common bacteria but poorly classified at present
- Human Microbiome Project
- Microbial ecology
