= Branching order of bacterial phyla (Genome Taxonomy Database, 2018) =

There are several models of the branching order of bacterial phyla, one of these is the Genome Taxonomy Database (GTDB).

The GTDB is an initiative to establish a standardised microbial taxonomy based on genome phylogeny, primarily funded by an Australian Research Council Laureate Fellowship. The genomes used to construct the phylogeny are obtained from RefSeq and Genbank, and GTDB releases are indexed to RefSeq releases, starting with release 76. Importantly and increasingly, this dataset includes draft genomes of uncultured microorganisms obtained from metagenomes and single cells, ensuring improved genomic representation of the microbial world. All genomes are independently quality controlled using CheckM before inclusion in GTDB.

The GTDB taxonomy is based on genome trees inferred with FastTree from an aligned concatenated set of 120 single copy marker proteins for Bacteria, and with IQ-TREE from a concatenated set of 53 (since RS207; 122 before) marker proteins for Archaea. Additional marker sets are also used to cross-validate tree topologies including concatenated ribosomal proteins and ribosomal RNA genes.

National Center for Biotechnology Information (NCBI) taxonomy was initially used to decorate the genome tree via tax2tree. The 16S rRNA-based Greengenes taxonomy is used to supplement the taxonomy particularly in regions of the tree with no cultured representatives. List of Prokaryotic names with Standing in Nomenclature (LPSN) is used as the primary taxonomic authority for establishing naming priorities. Taxonomic ranks are normalised using PhyloRank and the taxonomy manually curated to remove polyphyletic groups.

== Phylogeny ==
Cladogram was taken from GTDB release 11-RS232 (15th April 2026).

General note:

- The GTDB data only includes domain and phylum names. Any larger groupings are added by Wikipedia editors by matching to known taxonomic names on a best-effort basis.
- GTDB normalizes rank differences by genomic divergence, creating new names. Comments may be added after these names to indicate other names for such clades in literature.
- Due to the directness of conversion, quotations mark for proposed names are not provided.
- The GTDB tree, although provided in a Newick format with a root, should be treated as "effectively unrooted" according to GTDB authors. As a corollary, groups that appear paraphyletic on the GTDB tree are not necessarily paraphyletic: for a paraphyletic group with only one descendant group being left out, a re-rooting of the tree can transform it into a monophyletic group.

=== Archaea ===
- Archaea
  - "Undinarchaeota"
  - - - - "Huberarchaeaota"
        - - "Aenigmarchaeota"
          - - "Terrarchaeota"
            - "Nanohalarchaeota"
      - Nanobdellota
    - - - - "Altarchaeota"
          - - "Iainarchaeota"
            - "Micrarchaeota"
      - - "Methanococcia" {AGJL01}
        - - - - "Methanopyria" {JAADCQ01}
              - "Hydrothermarchaeota"
            - - - "Hadarchaeota"
                - "Thermococcia" {"Methanobacteriota B"}
              - Methanobacteriota
          - - - Thermoplasmatota
              - Halobacteriota
            - - "Korarchaeota"
              - - Thermoproteota
                - - Promethearchaeati
                    Promethearchaeota

=== Bacteria ===
- Bacteria
  - - Bacillati
      - - - "Sysuimicrobiota"
          - Deinococcota
        - - Chloroflexota [incl. "Dormibacterota"]
          - Minisyncoccota
      - - - Armatimonadota [incl. "Abditibacteriota"; "Fervidibacterota"]
          - Vulcanimicrobiota [incl. "Eremiobacterota"; "Palusbacterota"]
        - - Actinomycetota
          - Bacillota
  - - - Thermotogati
        - - - Dictyoglomota
            - Thermodesulfobiota
          - - Coprothermobacterota [incl. "Lithacetigenota"]
            - Caldisericota [incl. "Cryosericota"]
        - - Synergistota [incl. "Aminanaerobiota"]
          - - "Bipolaricaulota" [incl. "Acetithermota"; "Fraseribacteriota"]
            - Thermotogota
    - - - - - Fusobacteriati
              Fusobacteriota
          - Erysipelotrichia {Bacillota_I}
        - - "Cyanoprokaryota"
            - "Margulisbacteria" [incl."Saganiibacteriota"]
            - Cyanobacteriota [incl. "Blackalliibacteriota" ; "Melainobacteriota"]
      - - Pseudomonadati
          - "Muiribacteriota" [incl. "Riflebacteria", "Wallbacteria"]
          - - - - "Macinerneyibacteriota"
                - "Sumerlaeota"
              - - - "Lindowbacteria"
                  - "Salsurabacteriota" [DAL-3Gt_29_1_96C5R]
                - Spirochaetota
            - - - - - "Poribacteriota"
                    - "Oederibacteriota" [incl. "Firestoneibacteriota"; "Goldiibacteriota"; "Muellerivitota"]
                  - - - - "Aerophobota"
                        - Atribacterota [incl. "Caldatribacteriota"]
                      - - "Desantisiibacteriota"
                        - - "Ryujiniota"
                          - Elusimicrobiota
                    - - "Ratteibacteriota"
                      - "Omnitrophota"
                - - "Planctochlora"
                    - - "Planctobacteria"
                        - - "Abyssobacterota"
                          - "Hydrogenedentota"
                        - - Planctomycetota [incl. "Saltatorellota"]
                          - - "Auribacterota"
                            - - Chlamydiota
                              - Verrucomicrobiota [incl. Kiritimatiellota; Lentisphaerota]
                    - - "FCB group"
                        ⊞
                        ⊟
                        - - "Hinthialibacterota" (OLB16)
                          - "Tangaroaeota" (RBG-13-66-14; Coatesbacteria)
                        - - - - - "Edwardsiibacteriota"
                                - Caldifarciminota [incl. "Hydrothermota"; "Caldipriscota"; "Stahliibacteriota" ]
                              - - "Fermentibacterota" [incl. "Aegiribacterota"]
                                - "Cloacimonadota"
                            - - - - "Arandabacterota"
                                  - "Orphanbacterota"
                                - - "Eiseniibacteriota"
                                  - - "Joyebacterota" [incl. "Effluvivivacota"]
                                    - "Krumholzibacteriota" [incl. "Delphinibacteriota"]
                              - - Gemmatimonadota [incl. "Glassiibacteriota"]
                                - - "Latescibacterota" [incl. "Handelsmaniibacteriota"]
                                  - - "Blakebacterota"
                                    - - "Zixiibacteriota"
                                      - - - "Delongiibacteriota" [UBA4055] (RIF26)
                                          - Fibrobacterota [incl. "Raymondiibacteriota"]
                                        - - "Electryoneota" (AABM5-125-24)
                                          - - Fidelibacterota [incl. "Marinisomatota"]
                                            - - "Zhuqueibacterota" [incl. "Cosmopoliota"]
                                              - - Calditrichota
                                                - Bacteroidota [incl. Chlorobiota; Balneolota; Ignavibacteriota; "Kapaibacteriota"; "Kryptoniota"; Rhodothermota]
              - - "Proteobacteria
                  ⊞
                  ⊟
                  - Acidobacteriota [incl. "Aminicenantota"; "Fischeribacteriota"]
                  - - - - "Aquificida"
                          - "Acidulodesulfobacteriota" (sic) (SZUA-79)
                          - - - Calescibacterota ("Calescamantes")
                              - "Dadaibacteriota" (Desulfobacterota_D)
                            - - Desulfurellia {Campylobacterota_A}
                              - - Thermosulfidibacterota
                                - Aquificota
                      - - - - "Lernaellota" (FEN-1099)
                            - Myxococcota
                          - - Bdellovibrionota
                            - - - "Lambdaproteobacteria" {SAR324}
                                - "Oligoflexaeota"
                              - Myxococcota_A
                        - - - - - "Moduliflexota"
                                - "Methylomirabilota" [incl. "Rokuibacteriota"]
                              - - "Schekmaniibacteriota"
                                - - - "Spongiamicota"
                                    - "Tectimicrobiota"
                                  - Nitrospinota
                            - Nitrospirota [incl. "Leptospirillaeota" (sic)]
                          - Thermodesulfobacteriota [incl. Desulfobacterota; "Desulfuromonadota"; "Binatota"; "Deferrisomatota"; "Deferrimicrobiota"; "Desulfovibrionota"; "Tharpellota"]
                    - - "Babelota"
                      - - - Chrysiogenota [incl. Deferribacterota]
                          - Campylobacterota
                        - Pseudomonadota (s.s.)

== See also ==
- Branching order of bacterial phyla (Woese, 1987)
- Branching order of bacterial phyla (Rappe and Giovanoni, 2003)
- Branching order of bacterial phyla after ARB Silva Living Tree
- Branching order of bacterial phyla (Ciccarelli et al., 2006)
- Branching order of bacterial phyla (Battistuzzi et al., 2004)
- Branching order of bacterial phyla (Gupta, 2001)
- Branching order of bacterial phyla (Cavalier-Smith, 2002)
