= Bacterial evolution =

Bacterial evolution may refer to the biological evolution of bacteria as studied in:

- Bacterial taxonomy
  - List of Bacteria genera
  - List of bacterial orders
  - List of Archaea genera
  - List of Prokaryotic names with Standing in Nomenclature
- Bacterial phylodynamics
- Bacterial phyla
  - Branching order of bacterial phyla (Woese, 1987)
  - Branching order of bacterial phyla (Gupta, 2001)
  - Branching order of bacterial phyla (Cavalier-Smith, 2002)
  - Branching order of bacterial phyla (Rappe and Giovanoni, 2003)
  - Branching order of bacterial phyla (Ciccarelli et al., 2006)
  - Branching order of bacterial phyla (Battistuzzi et al., 2004)
  - 'The All-Species Living Tree' Project
  - Branching order of bacterial phyla (Genome Taxonomy Database, 2018)
