= Branching order of bacterial phyla =

Branching order of bacterial phyla may refer to these models:

- Branching order of bacterial phyla (Woese, 1987)
- Branching order of bacterial phyla (Gupta, 2001)
- Branching order of bacterial phyla (Cavalier-Smith, 2002)
- Branching order of bacterial phyla (Rappe and Giovanoni, 2003)
- Branching order of bacterial phyla (Battistuzzi et al., 2004)
- Branching order of bacterial phyla (Ciccarelli et al., 2006)
- Branching order of bacterial phyla (Genome Taxonomy Database, 2018)
- Branching order of bacterial phyla after ARB Silva Living Tree
