= Bacterium (disambiguation) =

Bacterium may refer to:

- Singular form of bacteria
- Bacterium (genus)
- Bacterium (film), a 2006 film

== See also ==
- Bacteria (disambiguation)
