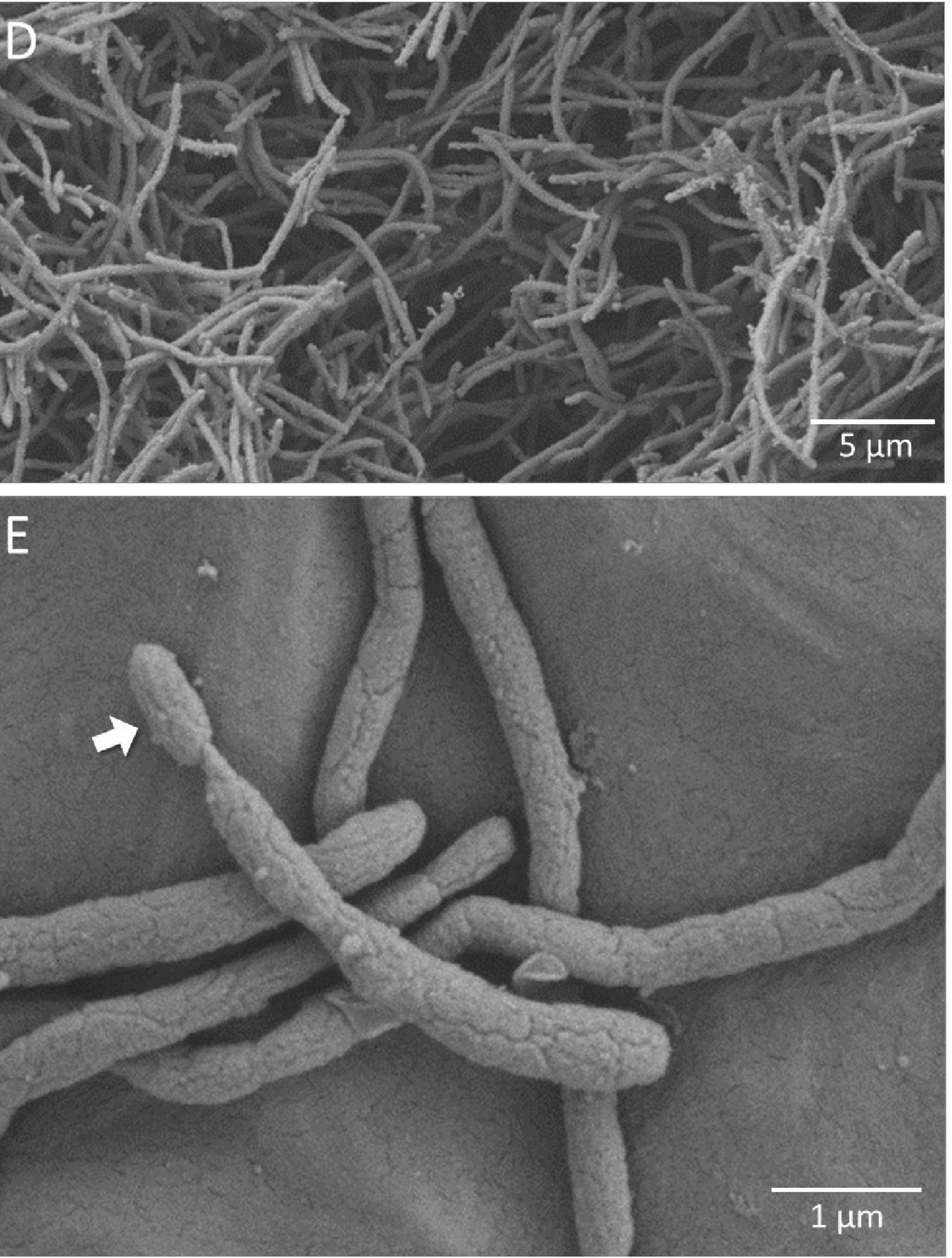

Scientific classification
- Domain: Bacteria
- Kingdom: Pseudomonadati
- Phylum: Gemmatimonadota
- Class: Gemmatimonadetes
- Order: Gemmatimonadales
- Family: Gemmatimonadaceae
- Genus: Gemmatimonas
- Species: G. groenlandica

Binomial name
- Gemmatimonas groenlandica Zeng et al. 2020

Type strain
- TET16

= Gemmatimonas groenlandica =

Species of bacterium

Gemmatimonas groenlandica is a bacterium species from the genus of Gemmatimonas which has been isolated from a stream in Zackenberg Valley, Greenland.

This species was isolated using a culturomics strategy using a mass spectroscopy-based high-throughput profiling method, along with a rapid screening technique for chlorophototrophs.

The species is an aerobic anoyxgenic photohetertroph; it is the first one of its kind isolated from this phylum. It can also be easily cultured in a liquid medium under fully aerobic conditions. Conversely, growth was not observed under photoautotrophic and chemoautotrophic conditions. Additionally, the species was not observed to ferment under anaerobic conditions. The cells were visualized utilizing scanning electron microscopy and transmission electron microscopy; they were found to exist as short to long rods, reproducing by binary fission and occasional budding. The cells were sensitive to neomycin, amoxicillin, tetracycline, and amphotericin B, but possessed antibiotic resistance to bacitracin, chloramphenicol, and nystatin.

Molecular data to date has indicated that chlorophototrophic Gemmatimonadetes bacteria can be found in a wide variety of environments (e.g. soils, lakes, rivers, biofilms, plant surfaces), with the exception of marine environments. However, sampling complexities and the prevailing perception of low activities of phototrophic bacteria in Arctic conditions have left CGBs grossly understudied. The ease with which Gemmatimonas groenlandica can now be cultured, which researchers have attributed to Greenland's cold low-biomass environment and their employment of antibiotics throughout initial enrichment, allows for more detailed physiological studies of this novel model microorganism and possible strain genetic engineering in the future.
