= Victivallis vadensis =

Scientific classification
- Domain: Bacteria
- Kingdom: Pseudomonadati
- Phylum: Lentisphaerota
- Class: Lentisphaeria
- Order: Victivallales
- Family: Victivallaceae
- Genus: Victivallis
- Species: V. vadensis

Binomial name
- Victivallis vadensis Zoetendal et al. 2003

Species of bacterium

Victivallis vadensis is a species of Gram-negative, coccus-shaped, bacteria found in the human digestive tract. It measures approximately 0.5–1.3 micrometers in diameter, is non-motile and chemoorganotrophic, and does not form spores. Victivallis vadensis is strictly anaerobic, as are 90 percent of the bacteria in the human gastrointestinal system.

== History ==
Victivallis vadensis was originally known as strain Cello^{T}, as it is able to use cellobiose as a carbon source. It was later renamed for an area in the Netherlands, known as "Food Valley", near the scientists at Wageningen University, who first identified the organism. (Victus is Latin for "food"; vallis is Latin for "valley".)

== Diversity ==
Victivallis vadensis is a facultative anaerobe, like most gut microbes. It has been sourced from human feces as well as the gastrointestinal tract of pigs. Through 16S rRNA gene sequencing, it has been determined that strain Cello^{T} forms its own cluster in the division Verrumicrobia, and two related but uncultured clones have been found that have a 94% 16S rRNA gene sequence similarity.

The genome of the type strain of Victivallis vadensis contains 4,577,257 bases with 3,541 protein-coding sequences, of which 2,031 are functional. G–C bases make up 59.5 percent of the DNA. This bacterium is most closely related to Lentisphaera araneosa with 84.4 percent of the same 16S rRNA. These two organisms are also differentiated based on the environments in which each is found. Lentisphaera spp. are found in seawater, while V. vadensis is found in the human digestive system.

== Biochemistry ==
Victivallis vadensis, taken from a human fecal sample, was first cultured in the Netherlands at an optimal temperature of 37°C and pH 6.5. Researchers discovered that it grows best in liquid or soft agar with one of the following sugars: cellobiose, fructose, galactose, glucose, lactose, lactulose, maltose, maltotriose, mannitol, melibiose, myo-inositol, raftilose, rhamnose, ribose, sucrose, and xylose, which it uses fermentatively. Formation of bacterial colonies under these conditions takes roughly 10 days.

Victivallis vadensis forms a slime layer outside of its cell membrane, which appears halo-like when examined microscopically. Researchers could also see assemblies with dense groups of electrons within the cells, which they believe to be protein precipitates or storage bodies. Colonies are lens-shaped, beige and shiny. It can be cultured syntrophically with Methanospirillum hungatei, where it produces methane from glucose in appropriate media. When attempting to isolate in culture, streptomycin and polymyxin B can be added to suppress contaminating organisms; Victivallis vadensis is resistant to both.
