= Chinese hamster ovary cell =

Cell line

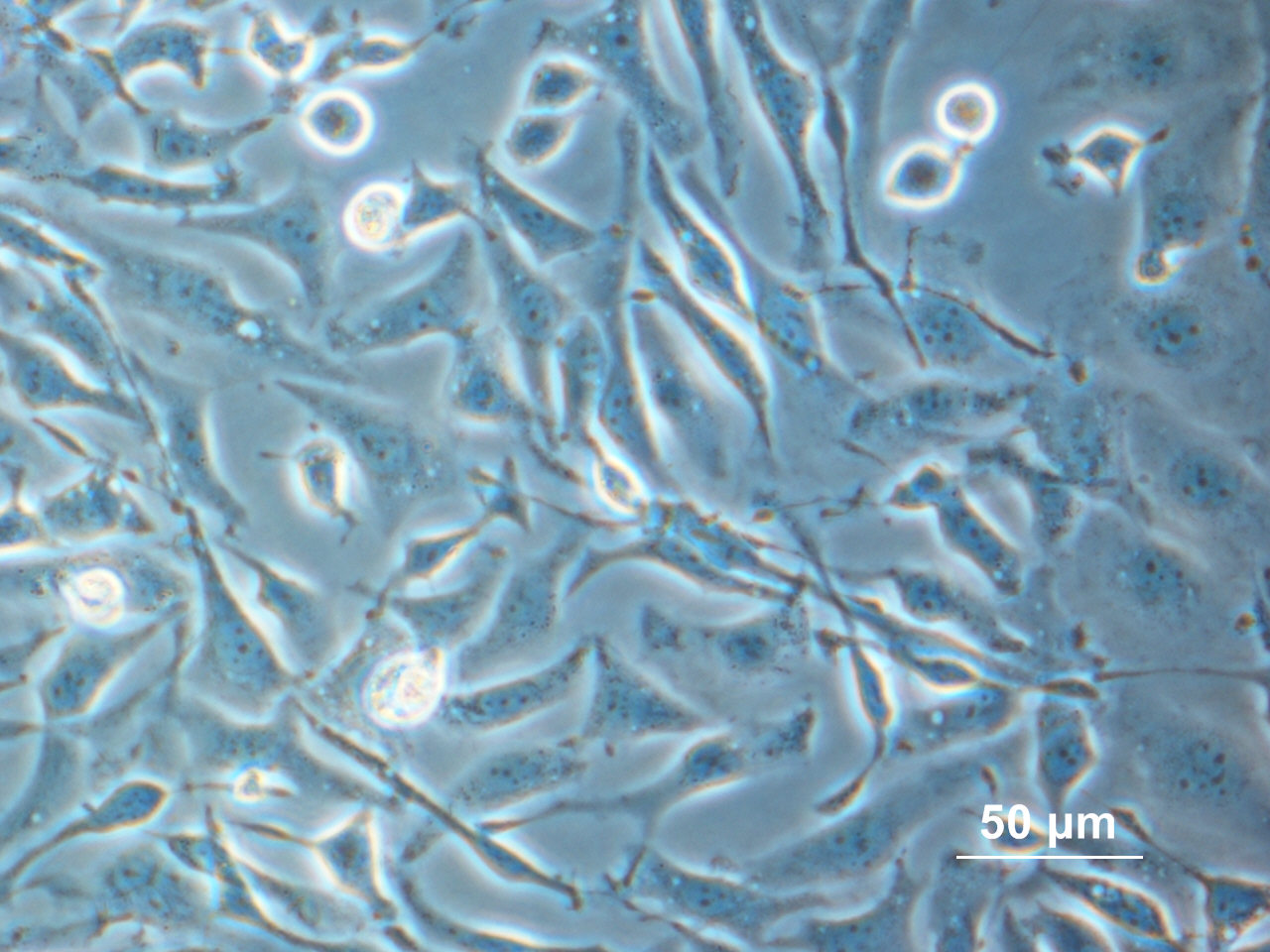
CHO cells adhered to a surface, seen under phase-contrast microscopy

Chinese hamster ovary (CHO) cells are a family of immortalized cell lines derived from epithelial cells of the ovary of the Chinese hamster, often used in biological and medical research and commercially in the production of recombinant therapeutic proteins. They have found wide use in studies of genetics, toxicity screening, nutrition and gene expression, and particularly since the 1980s to express recombinant proteins. CHO cells are the most commonly used mammalian hosts for industrial production of recombinant protein therapeutics.

== History ==
Chinese hamsters were first used in medical research in 1919, when Dr. E.T. Hsieh of the Peking Union Medical College used captured hamsters from the local fields for typing pneumococci. They were subsequently found by Jocelyn Smyly and Charles Young, two other doctors at the same institute, to be excellent vectors for transmission of kala-azar (visceral leishmaniasis), facilitating Leishmania research.

Unsuccessful attempts were made to breed the rodents in captivity, first at the Peking Union Medical College in 1928, and subsequently in the United States at the Harvard Medical School with a colony of 150 hamsters, which also failed; despite the researchers constructing extensive naturalistic mating burrows in the basement of the Harvard Comparative Pathology building, and then the grassy yard outside, the hamsters survived the harsh New England winter but did not reproduce.

In 1943, Italian geneticist Guido Pontecorvo counted only 14 comparatively large chromosomes in Chinese hamster cells, compared to 40 in mice and 42 in rats - the fewer and larger chromosomes were easier to isolate, characterize, and map, making the rodents sought after for genomic research.

In 1948, under the shadow of the Chinese Civil War, and weeks before the fall of Beijing, Dr. Hu Zhengxiang sent 20 Chinese hamsters, 10 male and 10 female, to Dr. Robert Briggs Watson, an American studying malaria in Nanjing, who took an 11-hour drive through blinding rain, narrowly avoiding roving bands of Communist troops, to deliver the animals to Shanghai and onto one of the last Pan-Am flights to the United States. The hamsters were shipped to Victor Schwentker, a skilled rodent breeder in upstate New York, from whom a Harvard graduate student, George Yerganian, purchased several animals and began his own breeding program and determined the correct number of chromosomes (2n=22). All modern CHO cells are descended from the 20 individuals provided by Dr. Hu in 1948; for his cooperation with American scientists, he was persecuted as a "reactionary academic authority" for aiding American germ warfare in the Korean War, and sentenced to a reeducation camp for six months. Decades later, during the Chinese Cultural Revolution in August 1966, these accusations resurfaced, leading to a vicious beating in his home at the hands of the Red Guard, shortly after which he and his wife committed suicide.

In 1957, Theodore T. Puck obtained a female Chinese hamster from now Dr. George Yerganian's laboratory at the Boston Cancer Research Foundation and used it to derive the original Chinese hamster ovary (CHO) cell line. Since then, CHO cells have been a cell line of choice because of their rapid growth in suspension culture, high protein production, and ability to produce proteins with mammalian post-transcriptional glycosylation.

The thrombolytic medication against myocardial infarction alteplase (Activase) was approved by the US Food and Drug Administration in 1987. It was the first commercially available recombinant protein produced from CHO cells. CHO cells continue to be the most widely used manufacturing approach for recombinant protein therapeutics and prophylactic agents. In 2019, six of the 10 best-selling drugs were made in CHO cells.

== Properties ==
All CHO cell lines are deficient in proline synthesis. Also, CHO cells do not express the epidermal growth factor receptor (EGFR), which makes them ideal in the investigation of various EGFR mutations.

Furthermore, Chinese hamster ovary cells are able to produce proteins with complex glycosylations, post-translational modifications (PTMs) similar to those produced in humans. They are easily growable in large-scale cultures and have great viability, which is why they are ideal for GMP protein production. Also, CHO cells are tolerant to variations in parameters, be it oxygen levels, pH-value, temperature or cell density.

Having a very low chromosome number (2n=22) for a mammal, the Chinese hamster is also a good model for radiation cytogenetics and tissue culture. Being the first cell line to be used for recombinant pharmaceutical production, regulatory concerns were raised with respect to Endogenous Retroviral Sequences (ERS). CHO cells contain about 1000 of these sequences and some of them are able to direct the synthesis of Intracisternal A-type particles and C-type particles. Also, low expression of reverse transcriptase was observed. However the majority of ERS are defective (stop codons in all reading frames) and contain large deletions of a putative retroviral genome.

== Variants ==
Since the original CHO cell line was described in 1956, many variants of the cell line have been developed for various purposes. In 1957, CHO-K1 was generated from a single clone of CHO cells. According to an industry source, however, scientist Theodore Puck first isolated CHO-K1 in 1968. Puck and colleagues reported starting a cell line of Chinese hamster ovarian origin in 1957. Variants of K1 include the deposits in ATCC, ECACC, and a version adapted for growth in protein-free medium.

CHO-K1 was mutagenized in the 1970s with ethyl methanesulfonate to generate a cell line lacking dihydrofolate reductase (DHFR) activity, referred to as CHO-DXB11 (also referred to as CHO-DUKX). However, these cells, when mutagenized, could revert to DHFR activity, making their utility for research somewhat limited. Subsequently in 1983, CHO cells were mutagenized with gamma radiation to yield a cell line in which both alleles of the DHFR locus were completely eliminated, termed CHO-DG44. These DHFR-deficient strains require glycine, hypoxanthine, and thymidine for growth. Cell lines with mutated DHFR are useful for genetic manipulation as cells transfected with a gene of interest along with a functional copy of the DHFR gene can easily be screened for in thymidine-lacking media. Due to this, CHO cells lacking DHFR are the most widely used CHO cells for industrial protein production.

More recently, other selection systems have become popular and with vector systems that can more efficiently target active chromatin in CHO cells, antibiotic selection (puromycin) can be used as well to generate recombinant cells expressing proteins at high level. This sort of system requires no special mutation, so that non-DHFR-deficient host cell culture have been found to produce excellent levels of proteins.

Since CHO cells have a very high propensity of genetic instability (like all immortalised cells) one should not assume that the names applied indicate their usefulness for manufacturing purposes. For example, the three K1 offspring cultures available in 2013 each have significant accumulated mutations compared to each other. Most, if not all industrially used CHO cell lines are now cultivated in animal component free media or in chemically defined media, and are used in large scale bioreactors under suspension culture. The complex genetics of CHO cells and the issues concerning clonal derivation of cell population was extensively discussed.

== Genetic manipulation ==
Much of the genetic manipulation done in CHO cells is done in cells lacking DHFR enzyme. This genetic selection scheme remains one of the standard methods to establish transfected CHO cell lines for the production of recombinant therapeutic proteins. The process begins with the molecular cloning of the gene of interest and the DHFR gene into a single mammalian expression system. The plasmid DNA carrying the two genes is then transfected into cells, and the cells are grown under selective conditions in a thymidine-lacking medium. Surviving cells will have the exogenous DHFR gene along with the gene of interest integrated in its genome. The growth rate and the level of recombinant protein production of each cell line varies widely. To obtain a few stably transfected cell lines with the desired phenotypic characteristics, evaluating several hundred candidate cell lines may be necessary.

The CHO and CHO-K1 cell lines can be obtained from a number of biological resource centres such as the European Collection of Cell Cultures, which is part of the Health Protection Agency Culture Collections. These organizations also maintain data, such as growth curves, timelapse videos of growth, images, and subculture routine information.

== Industrial use ==
CHO cells are the most common mammalian cell line used for mass production of therapeutic proteins such as monoclonal antibodies, used in 70% of therapeutic mAbs. They can produce recombinant protein on the scale of 3–10 grams per liter of culture. Products of CHO cells are suitable for human applications, as these mammalian cells perform human-like post-translational modifications to recombinant proteins, which is key to the functioning of several proteins. It is believed that CHO-K1 transgenic cells are characterized by higher monoclonal antibody expression at the expense of biomass accumulation, for example, based on CHO-K1, monoclonal antibody‑producing cell lines with productivity up to 6.5 grams per liter have been selected.

== See also ==
- Cell culture
- Drug development
- Preclinical development
