= Branching order of bacterial phyla (Rappe and Giovanoni, 2003) =

There are several models of the Branching order of bacterial phyla, the most cited of these was proposed in 1987 paper by Carl Woese. This cladogram was later expanded by Rappé and Giovanoni in 2003 to include newly discovered phyla. Clear names are added in parentheses, see list of bacterial phyla.

- - Aquificae
  - Desulfurobacterium
- - - OP1 (Acetothermia)
    - - Dictyoglomus
      - - Coprothermobacter
        - Thermotogae
  - - Thermodesulfobacteria
    - - Deinococcus-Thermus
      - - - Chloroflexi
          - - - TM7 (Saccharibacteria)
              - - SC3
                - - Guaymas1
                  - WS5
            - - - ABY1 (OD1-ABY1 of Parcubacteria)
                - BD1-5 group (Gracilibacteria)
              - - WS6 (Dojkabacteria)
                - OP11 (Microgenomates)
        - - - Spirochaetes
            - - Caldiserica
              - Synergistes
          - - - - Proteobacteria
                - - SBR1093
                  - - Chrysiogenes arsenatis
                    - Deferribacteres
              - - TM6 (Dependentiae)
                - - Acidobacteria
                  - - OP8 (Aminicenantes)
                    - OS-K
                  - - Elusimicrobia
                    - Nitrospira
              - FCB group (Sphingobacteria)
                - - Fibrobacteres
                  - Gemmatimonadates
                - - - Bacteroidetes
                    - Chlorobi
                  - - Caldithrix
                    - Marine group A (Marinimicrobia)
            - - - - NKB19 (Hydrogenedentes)
                  - - WS3 (Latescibacteria)
                    - BRC1 (Sumerlaeota)
                - PVC superphylum (Planctobacteria)
                  - Poribacteria
                  - - - OP3 (Omnitrophica)
                      - Planctomycetes
                    - - Chlamydiae
                      - - Lentisphaerae
                        - Verrucomicrobia
              - - - Fusobacteria
                  - - Cyanobacteria
                    - - OP9 (Atribacteria)
                      - Firmicutes
                      - WS2
                - - - Actinobacteria
                    - NC10
                  - - Armatimonadetes
                    - SC4

== See also ==
- Branching order of bacterial phyla (Woese, 1987)
- Branching order of bacterial phyla (Rappé and Giovanoni, 2003)
- Branching order of bacterial phyla after ARB Silva Living Tree
- Branching order of bacterial phyla (Ciccarelli et al., 2006)
- Branching order of bacterial phyla (Battistuzzi et al., 2004)
- Branching order of bacterial phyla (Gupta, 2001)
- Branching order of bacterial phyla (Cavalier-Smith, 2002)
