= G. aurantiaca =

G. aurantiaca may refer to:

- Gemmatimonas aurantiaca, a bacterium
- Guarianthe aurantiaca, an orchid species
