= Aerobic anoxygenic phototrophic bacteria =

Aerobic anoxygenic phototrophic bacteria (AAPB) are mainly Alphaproteobacteria that are obligate aerobes that are able to capture energy from light by photophosphorylation to produce ATP. Water is not used as an electron donor and, therefore, the production of oxygen is non-existent. AAPB contain bacteriochlorophyll a as its main light harvesting pigment, but are not anaerobic like other bacteria that perform anoxygenic photosynthesis. Aerobic anoxygenic phototrophic bacteria are photoheterotrophic, meaning they obtain their carbon from organic compounds. They exist in a variety of aquatic environments and may constitute over 10% of the open ocean microbial community, being particularly abundant in oligotrophic conditions where they were found to be 24% of the community. Predation, as well as the availability of phosphorus and light, have been shown to be important factors that influence AAPB growth in their natural environments. AAPB are thought to play an important role in carbon cycling by relying on organic matter and acting as sinks for dissolved organic carbon. There is still a knowledge gap in research areas regarding the abundance and genetic diversity of AAPB, as well as the environmental variables that regulate these two properties.

== Cellular structure ==
Research suggests that all currently known AAPB contain Gram-negative cell walls. The majority have shapes that resemble cylinders, as well as flagella and pili. AAP bacteria are motile due to one polar or subpolar flagellum. Species of these bacteria such as Roseobacter denitrificans and Sandaracinobacter sibiricus have up to three subpolar flagella. AAPB cell dimensions are normally, 1.2 μm long, 0.7 μm in diameter, and a cell volume of 0.5 μm^{3}. Their dry weight is 0.05 pg and wet weight is 0.5 pg. 3 types of cell division are known to exist within AAPB, 2 daughter-cell division, 4 daughter-cell division, and the non-typical 3 daughter-cell division, commonly referred to as Y-cell division. AAPB are usually pink or orange in color when isolated from water. Current data suggests that marine bacteria have generation times of several days, whereas new evidence exists that shows AAPB to have a much shorter generation time. All species of AAPB produce large amounts of carotenoid pigments. The color of each species is due to the presence of carotenoids, giving peaks in the blue and green absorption spectra. Light harvesting complexes with unusual absorption maxima have been discovered due to the isolation and characterization of new aerobic phototrophic species.

A new strain of aerobic anoxygenic phototrophic bacteria, JF-1, was recently isolated from deep-ocean hydrothermal vent waters. These bacteria were found to be pleomorphic which shapes varying from coccoid and ovoid rods, to bean-shaped. The coccoid bacteria were from 0.4 to 0.5 μm in size. The ovoid rods were 0.4 to 0.5 μm in diameter, and 1.0 to 1.2 μm in length. Thread-like formations of up to five bacterial cells were also observed in these vents.

== Taxonomy ==
Aerobic anoxygenic phototrophic bacteria are divided into two groups; there are two marine genera (Erythrobacter and Roseobacter), and five freshwater genera (Acidiphilium, Blastomonas (synonym: Erythromonas), Erythrobacter, Roseococcus, and Sandaracinobacter). Most AAP bacteria belong to subgroups of Alphaproteobacteria, but some species are known within the Betaproteobacteria and Gammaproteobacteria. Additionally, Chloracidobacterium thermophilum and Gemmatimonas phototrophica are recently characterized species of AAPB within the phyla Acidobacteria and Gemmatimonadota, respectively. Of phototrophic prokaryotes in the ocean, AAP bacteria are the third most numerous group.

== Carbon cycling ==
AAPB play a key role in carbon cycling but to what extent is still being investigated. The key to determining their role in marine ecosystems was originally thought to be the AAPB in total bacteria (AAPB%); however, this no longer seems to be the case because AAPB have been found to be much larger than other aquatic bacteria and so their actual effect on production is now thought to be much larger than their abundance would suggest. Since AAPB themselves lack a way to fix carbon, they instead rely on organic matter substrates as a carbon source. Because of this, AAPB are now thought to play an important role in the sequestration of total organic carbon, and act as sinks for dissolved organic carbon. AAPB have also been found to act as sources of total organic carbon in some freshwater systems and to be producers of carbon at groundwater-surface water exchange systems.

== Distribution ==
AAPB are widely distributed in coastal and oceanic environments. AAPB may constitute over 10% of the open ocean microbial community, being particularly abundant in oligotrophic conditions where they were found to make up around 24% of the microbes present. One study revealed that the surface water of the Indian Ocean ranked the highest of the oceans in AAPB% at 3.79, followed by the Atlantic Ocean (1.57 AAPB%) and the Pacific Ocean (1.08 AAPB%). There was a positive correlation with oceans that held higher values of AAPB% and those with higher levels of chlorophyll a. More specifically, the coastal/shelf waters of these oceans had greater amounts of AAPB, some as high as 13.51% AAPB%. Phytoplankton also affect AAPB%, but little research has been performed in this area. They can also be abundant in various oligotrophic conditions, including the most oligotrophic regime of the world ocean. They are globally distributed in the euphotic zone and represent a hitherto unrecognized component of the marine microbial community that appears to be critical to the cycling of both organic and inorganic carbon in the ocean.

== Isolation, enrichment, and maintenance ==
Aerobic phototrophic bacteria are unable to be isolated on selective medium. Instead, these bacteria are indicated by the colony color due to presence of carotenoids. Aerobic phototrophic bacteria can be isolated using media that are rich in organic compounds using direct inoculation of water samples or sand samples. Inoculated plates are prepared in conditions similar to the natural environments of the collected sample to increase survivability of the bacteria. The presence of Bchl a is what separates these bacteria from other heterotrophic bacteria.

Aerobic phototrophic species can remain viable for at least 2 months when stored at 4 °C in liquid or on agar surfaces. They can also be preserved long-term by storing in liquid nitrogen or at temperatures -70 °C and below.

== Limiting growth factors ==
Compared to most other bacteria in their natural environment, AAPB have a relatively large predation pressure, resulting in high growth rates which balance out the high level of grazing they experience. The removal of predators and this grazing pressure results in a large increase in AAP relative to the other bacteria in the environment. Additionally, phosphorus has been identified as a common limiting factor in AAPB growth, which has been shown to sometimes be a stronger limiting factor to AABP growth than predation. Light availability has also been shown to be a factor that stimulates AAPB population growth. One effect light has on AAP that has been linked to increased growth is that it has been shown to increase the membrane potential of the bacteria. Increased light exposure has also been shown to extenuate the growth rate increase caused by removal of predators and the amendment of phosphorus levels.

== Sources ==
- Fenchel, T. (2001). "Ecology. Marine bugs and carbon flow". Science. 292 (5526): 2444–2445. doi:10.1126/science.1062799. PMID 11431556. S2CID 82933564.
- Fuchs, B. M.; Spring, S.; Teeling, H.; Quast, C.; Wulf, J.; Schattenhofer, M.; Yan, S.; Ferriera, S.; Johnson, J.; Glöckner, F. O.; Amann, R. (2007). "Characterization of a marine gammaproteobacterium capable of aerobic anoxygenic photosynthesis". Proceedings of the National Academy of Sciences of the United States of America. 104 (8): 2891–6. doi:10.1073/pnas.0608046104. PMC 1815277. PMID 17299055.
- Béjà, O.; Suzuki, M. T.; Heidelberg, J. F.; Nelson, W. C.; Preston, C. M.; Hamada, T.; Eisen, J. A.; Fraser, C. M.; Delong, E. F. (2002). "Unsuspected diversity among marine aerobic anoxygenic phototrophs". Nature. 415 (6872): 630–633. Bibcode:2002Natur.415..630B. doi:10.1038/415630a. PMID 11832943.
