= Budapest Treaty =

1977 patent law treaty

Budapest Treaty on the International Recognition of the Deposit of Microorganisms for the Purposes of Patent Procedure
- Signed: 28 April 1977
- Location: Budapest, Hungary
- Effective: 19 August 1980
- Condition: ratification by five States
- Parties: 92
- Depositary: Director-General of WIPO
- Language: English, French

The Budapest Treaty on the International Recognition of the Deposit of Microorganisms for the Purposes of Patent Procedure, or Budapest Treaty, is an international treaty signed in Budapest, Hungary, on April 28, 1977. It entered into force on August 19, 1980, and was later amended on September 26, 1980. The treaty is administered by the World Intellectual Property Organization (WIPO).

The Budapest Treaty concerns a specific topic in the international patent process: microorganisms. All states party to the Treaty are obliged to recognize microorganisms deposited as a part of the patent procedure, irrespective of where the depository authority is located. In practice this means that the requirement to submit microorganisms to each and every national authority in which patent protection is sought no longer exists.

== Membership ==
As of January 2026, 92 countries are party to the Budapest Treaty. The accession to the Treaty is open to States party to the Paris Convention for the Protection of Industrial Property of 1883. The African Regional Industrial Property Organization (ARIPO), the Eurasian Patent Organization (EAPO) and the European Patent Organisation (EPO) have filed a declaration of acceptance under Article 9(1)(a) of the Treaty.

== Content ==
The treaty allows "deposits of microorganisms at an international depositary authority to be recognized for the purposes of patent procedure". Usually, in order to meet the legal requirement of sufficiency of disclosure, patent applications and patents must disclose in their description the subject-matter of the invention in a manner sufficiently clear and complete to be carried out by the person skilled in the art (see also: reduction to practice). When an invention involves a microorganism, completely describing said invention in the description to enable third parties to carry it out is usually impossible. This is why, in the particular case of inventions involving microorganisms, a deposit of biological material must be made in a recognised institution. The Budapest Treaty ensures that an applicant, i.e. a person who applies for a patent, needs not to deposit the biological material in all countries where he/she wants to obtain a patent. The applicant needs only to deposit the biological material at one recognised institution, and this deposit will be recognised in all countries party to the Budapest Treaty.

=== International depositary authority ===
The deposits are made at an international depositary authority (IDA) in accordance with the rules of the Treaty on or before the filing date of the complete patent application. Article 7 of the Budapest treaty outlines the requirements for a facility to become an International Depositary Authority. As of July 23, 2018, there were 47 IDAs in approximately 25 countries worldwide. On April 25, 2024, there were 50 such authorities: seven in the United Kingdom, four in the Republic of Korea, three in China, India, Italy, Poland and the United States of America, two each in Australia, Japan, the Russian Federation and Spain, and one each in Belgium, Bulgaria, Canada, Chile, the Czech Republic, Finland, France, Germany, Hungary, Latvia, Mexico, Morocco, the Netherlands (Kingdom of the), Portugal, Slovakia and Switzerland.

=== Depositable subject matter ===
IDA's have accepted deposits for biological materials which do not fall within a literal interpretation of "microorganism". The Treaty does not define what is meant by "microorganism."

The range of materials able to be deposited under the Budapest Treaty includes:

- cells, for example, bacteria, fungi, eukaryotic cell lines, plant spores;
- genetic vectors (such as plasmids or bacteriophage vectors or viruses) containing a gene or DNA fragments;
- organisms used for expression of a gene (making the protein from the DNA).

There are many types of expression systems: bacterial; yeast; viral; plant or animal cell cultures;

- yeast, algae, protozoa, eukaryotic cells, cell lines, hybridomas, viruses, plant tissue cells, spores, and hosts containing materials such as vectors, cell organelles, plasmids, DNA, RNA, genes and chromosomes;
- purified nucleic acids; or
- deposits of materials not readily classifiable as microorganisms, such as "naked" DNA, RNA, or plasmids

== See also ==
- List of parties to the Budapest Treaty
- American Type Culture Collection (ATCC)
- Centraalbureau voor Schimmelcultures (CBS)
- Gottfried Wilhelm Leibniz Scientific Community (DSMZ)
- European Collection of Authenticated Cell Cultures (ECACC)
- National Collection of Yeast Cultures (NCYC)
- World Federation for Culture Collections (WFCC)
- National Collection of Type Cultures (NCTC)
- National Collection of Industrial Food and Marine Bacteria (NCIMB)
