= Amycolicicoccus =

Scientific classification
- Domain: Bacteria
- Kingdom: Bacillati
- Phylum: Actinomycetota
- Class: Actinomycetes
- Order: Mycobacteriales
- Family: Mycobacteriaceae
- Genus: Amycolicicoccus; Wang et al. 2010

Type species
- A. subflavus

Genus of bacteria

Amycolicicoccus is a genus in the phylum Actinobacteria (Bacteria).

== Etymology ==
The name Amycolicicoccus derives from: Greek prefix a- (ἄ) not; New Latin noun acidum mycolicum, mycolic acid; New Latin masculine gender noun coccus (from Greek noun kokkos (κόκκος)) a grain, berry; New Latin masculine gender noun Amycolicicoccus, a coccus without mycolic acids.

== Species ==
The genus contains a single species, namely A. subflavus ( Wang et al. 2010, (Type species of the genus).; Latin masculine gender adjective subflavus, yellowish.)

== See also ==
- Bacterial taxonomy
- Microbiology
