= Gemmatimonas phototrophica =

Scientific classification
- Domain: Bacteria
- Kingdom: Pseudomonadati
- Phylum: Gemmatimonadota
- Class: Gemmatimonadetes
- Order: Gemmatimonadales
- Family: Gemmatimonadaceae
- Genus: Gemmatimonas
- Species: G. phototrophica

Binomial name
- Gemmatimonas phototrophica Zeng et al. 2015

Type strain
- AP64

Species of bacterium

Gemmatimonas phototrophica is an aerobic, anoxygenic and chlorophotoheterotroph bacterium species from the genus of Gemmatimonas.
