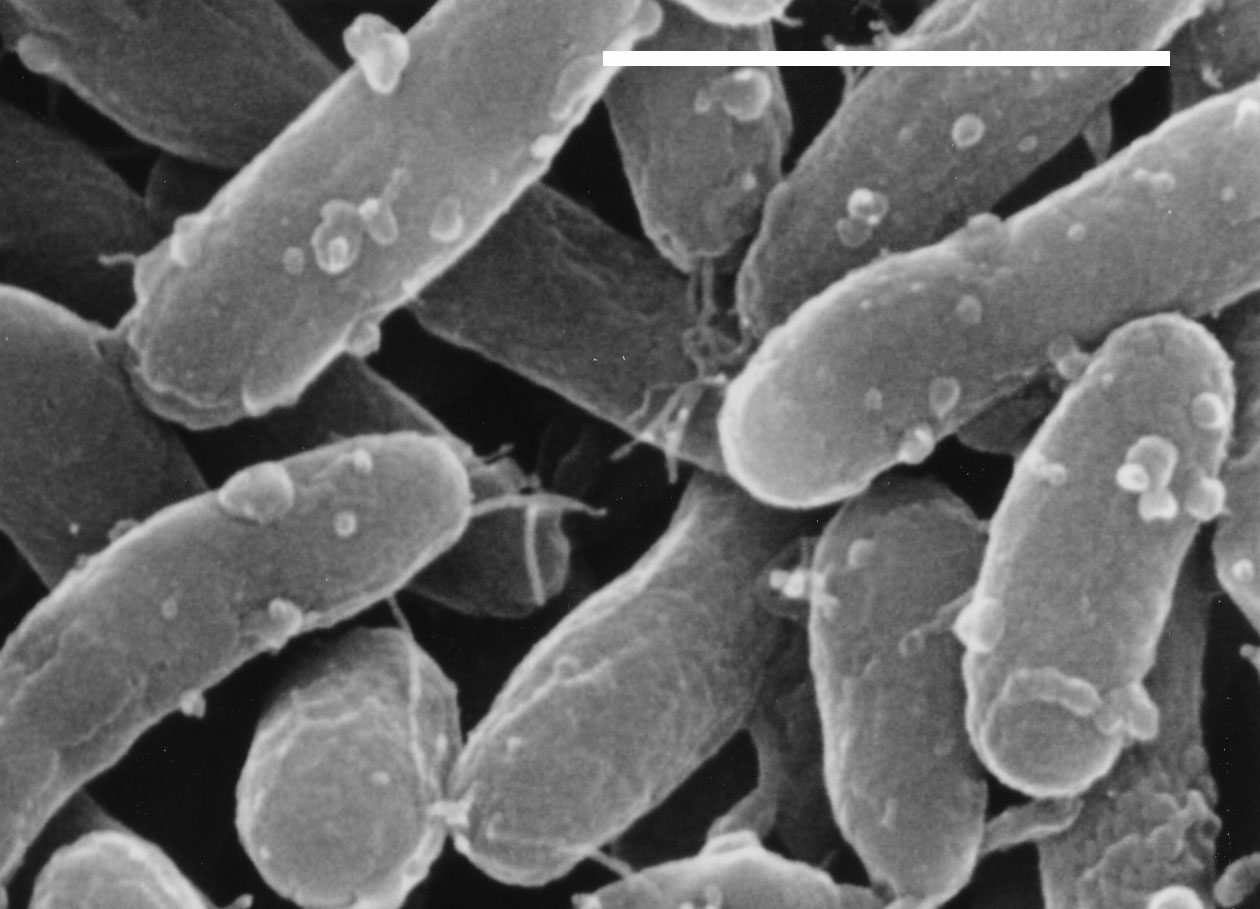

Scientific classification
- Domain: Bacteria
- Kingdom: Pseudomonadati
- Phylum: Gemmatimonadota
- Class: Gemmatimonadetes
- Order: Gemmatimonadales
- Family: Gemmatimonadaceae
- Genus: Gemmatimonas; Zhang et al. 2003

Type species
- Gemmatimonas aurantiaca Zhang et al. 2003

Species
- G. aurantiaca; "G. groenlandica"; G. phototrophica

Synonyms
- Gemmimonas (sic)

= Gemmatimonas =

Genus of bacteria

Gemmatimonas is a Gram-negative, rod-shaped, motile and non-spore-forming genus of bacteria from the family of Gemmatimonaceae.

== Phylogeny ==
The currently accepted taxonomy is based on the List of Prokaryotic names with Standing in Nomenclature (LPSN) and National Center for Biotechnology Information (NCBI).

16S rRNA based LTP_08_2023

- Gemmatimonas
  - G. aurantiaca
  - G. phototrophica

120 marker proteins based GTDB 10-RS226

- Gemmatimonas
  - "G. groenlandica" Zeng et al. 2020
  - - G. aurantiaca Zhang et al. 2003
    - G. phototrophica Zeng et al. 2015

== See also ==
- List of bacterial orders
- List of bacteria genera
