= Lentisphaera araneosa =

Scientific classification
- Domain: Bacteria
- Kingdom: Pseudomonadati
- Phylum: Lentisphaerota
- Class: Lentisphaeria
- Order: Lentisphaerales
- Family: Lentisphaeraceae
- Genus: Lentisphaera
- Species: L. araneosa

Binomial name
- Lentisphaera araneosa Cho et al. 2004

Species of bacterium

Lentisphera araneosa is a marine bacteria strain in the bacterial phylum Lentisphaerota. They are able to produce viscous transparent exopolymers and grow attached to each other by the polymer in a three-dimensional configuration. They are part of the natural surface bacterial population in the Atlantic and Pacific oceans. They are less than 1% of the total bacterial community. This species is gram negative, non-motile, non-pigmented, aerobic, chemoheterotrophic, and facultatively oligotrophic sphere-shaped. Its genome has been sequenced.
