= Verrucomicrobium =

Scientific classification
- Domain: Bacteria
- Kingdom: Pseudomonadati
- Phylum: Verrucomicrobiota
- Class: Verrucomicrobiia
- Order: Verrucomicrobiales
- Family: Verrucomicrobiaceae
- Genus: Verrucomicrobium; Schlesner, 1988
- Species: V. spinosum

Binomial name
- Verrucomicrobium spinosum Schlesner, 1988

Species of bacterium

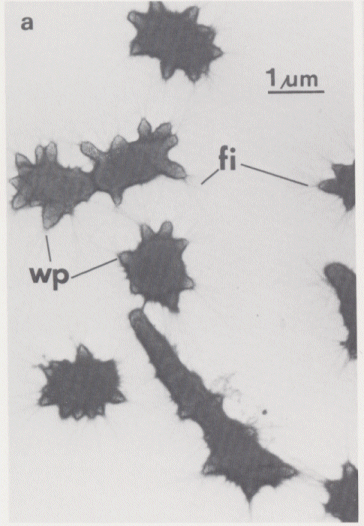
Pointers labeled 'wp' show wart-like prosthecae and pointers labeled 'fi' show hair-like fimbriae that extend from the tips of some prosthecae. From The Prokaryotes: The Genus Verrucomicrobium by Heinz Schlesner (Release 3.0, 5/21/1999).

Verrucomicrobium is a monotypic genus of bacteria. Its sole described species is Verrucomicrobium spinosum, which was isolated and described by Heinz Schlesner in 1987. It was the first named organism of what is now the phylum Verrucomicrobiota, described by Hedlund, Gosink and J. T. Staley in 1996.

Prosthecobacter fusiformis, which was isolated by Jan De Bont (DeBont and Staley, 1971), was the first isolate of the yet-to-be named Verrucomicrobiota (16S rRNA gene sequences were not available then). Later the Verrucomicrobiota were shown to be members of the PVC superphylum. Four of the currently named species of Prosthecobacter contain bacterial tubulin genes, btuba and btubb, which, at this time, are only known bacterial homologs of eukaryotic α- and β-tubulins."

== Phylogeny and taxonomy ==
See Verrucomicrobiota for diagrams and discussion.
