= Bacteria (disambiguation) =

Bacteria are a major group of prokaryotic living organisms.

Bacteria may also refer to:

- Bacteria (malware) or Rabbit Programs, a type of malicious software
- Bacteria, a fictional country in The Great Dictator
- Bacteria (Asterix character), the wife of Unhygienix in the Asterix comics
- Bacteriidae, a family of South American stick insect
