= Bacterium (genus) =

Obsolete genus of bacteria

The obsolete genus Bacterium was a taxon described in 1828 by Christian Gottfried Ehrenberg.

By 1935, the original type species Bacterium triloculare had become "unrecognizable". It was [eventually] changed to Bacterium coli (now Escherichia coli).

In 1951 and then in 1954 Bacterium was recognised as a nomen generum rejiciendum, which means a generic name (name of a genus) to be rejected; this also applied to its family Bacteriaceae.

This genus included non-spore-forming rods whose relation to other species was obscure (a "taxonomy dumping group"). This is different from the genus Bacillus, whose members were spore-forming rods (sensu Cohn 1872).

== Species ==
Many species were placed under the genus. Given that the genus was abolished in the process of forming the Bacteriological Code there is no such thing as an official list of species present. These are those accepted by Breed and Conn in 1935:

- Bacterium tumefaciens, now Agrobacterium radiobacter
- Bacterium aerogenes, now Klebsiella aerogenes
- Bacterium violaceum, now Chromobacterium violaceum
- Bacterium amylovorum, now Erwinia amylovora
- Bacterium zopfii, now Kurthia zopfii
- Bacterium monocytogenes, now Listeria monocytogenes
- Bacterium pneumoniae, now Klebsiella pneumoniae

== See also ==
- Bacteria
- Bacterial taxonomy
