= Modulibacteria =

Scientific classification (Candidatus)
- Domain: Bacteria
- Kingdom: Pseudomonadati
- Phylum: Moduliflexota corrig. Sekiguchi et al. 2015

Class
- "Moduliflexia"

Synonyms
- "Modulibacteria" (sic) Sekiguchi et al. 2015

Phylum of bacteria

Modulibacteria (Moduliflexota) is a bacterial phylum formerly known as KS3B3 or GN06. It is a candidate phylum, meaning there are no cultured representatives of this group. Members of the Modulibacteria phylum are known to cause fatal filament overgrowth (bulking) in high-rate industrial anaerobic wastewater treatment bioreactors.

The Modulibacteria phylum was first proposed in 2006 by two independent research groups based on analyses of 16S rRNA gene sequences. One group recovered Modulibacteria sequences from the a hypersaline microbial mat from Guerrero Negro (Baja California Sur, Mexico) and used the provisional name GN06 for the novel phylum, while the other recovered sequences from sulfur-rich black mud marine sediments (CA, USA) and used the provisional name KSB3.

The first genomic insights into the phylum were achieved in 2015, at which time the name "Modulibacteria" was proposed. Two genomes were recovered from methanogenic sludge samples of a full-scale upflow anaerobic sludge blanket (UASB) reactor treating a high-strength organic wastewater discharged from a food-processing factory.

Through a combination of genome-based metabolic reconstruction and microscopic observation, it was determined that the two studied Modulibacteria species (Moduliflexus flocculans and Vecturithrix granuli) produce filamentous structures and are Gram-negative, strictly anaerobic fermenters capable of non-flagellar based gliding motility. Both have an unusually large number of sensory and response regulator genes compared to other bacteria.

Members of the Modulibacteria phylum have been detected in a variety of environments in addition to bioreactors and hypersaline mats, such as wetland sediments (FJ516883.1), the dolphin mouth, and a tubeworm from a coldseep (FM165273).

== Taxonomy ==
The following taxonomy was proposed by Sekiguchi et al. 2015 and phylogeny by GTDB 08-RS214

- Class "Moduliflexia" Sekiguchi et al. 2015 ["Vecturitrichia" Sekiguchi et al. 2015]
  - Order "Moduliflexales" Sekiguchi et al. 2015 ["Vecturatrichales" Sekiguchi et al. 2015]
    - Family "Moduliflexaceae" Sekiguchi et al. 2015 ["Vecturatrichaceae" Sekiguchi et al. 2015]
      - Genus "Candidatus Moduliflexus" Sekiguchi et al. 2015
        - Species "Ca. M. flocculans" Sekiguchi et al. 2015
      - Genus "Candidatus Vecturithrix" Sekiguchi et al. 2015
        - Species "Ca. V. granuli" Sekiguchi et al. 2015
