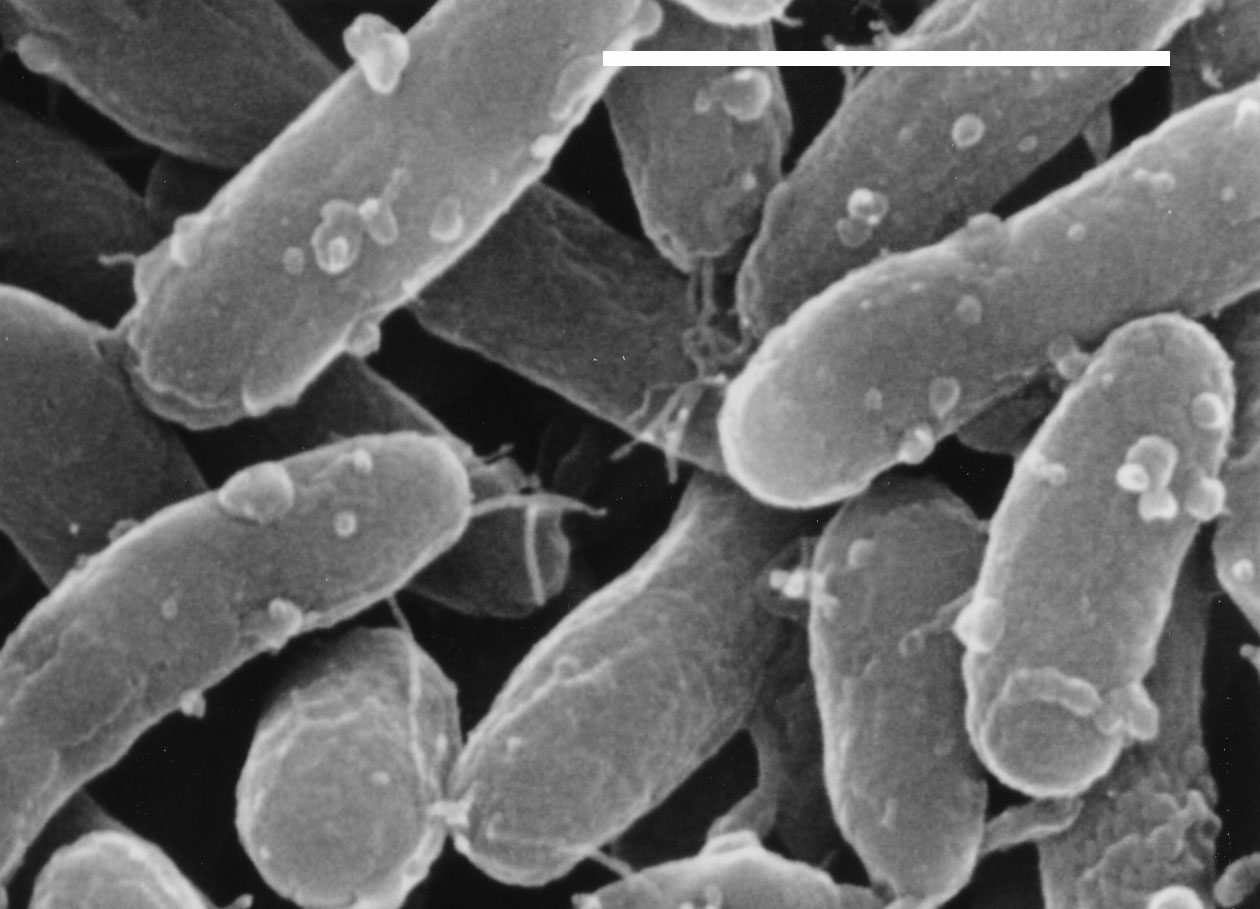
- Gemmatimonas aurantiaca

Scientific classification
- Domain: Bacteria
- Kingdom: Pseudomonadati
- Phylum: Gemmatimonadota
- Class: Gemmatimonadetes
- Order: Gemmatimonadales
- Family: Gemmatimonadaceae
- Genus: Gemmatimonas
- Species: G. aurantiaca

Binomial name
- Gemmatimonas aurantiaca Zhang et al. 2003

= Gemmatimonas aurantiaca =

Species of bacterium

Gemmatimonas aurantiaca is a Gram-negative, aerobic, polyphosphate-accumulating micro-organism. It is a Gram-negative, rod-shaped aerobe, with type strain T-27^{T} (=JCM 11422^{T} =DSM 14586^{T}). It replicates by budding.
