= Atribacter =

Scientific classification
- Domain: Bacteria
- Kingdom: Pseudomonadati
- Phylum: Atribacterota
- Class: Atribacteria
- Order: Atribacterales
- Family: Atribacteraceae
- Genus: Atribacter; Katayama et al. 2021

Type species
- Atribacter laminatus Katayama et al. 2021

Species
- "Ca. A. allofermentans"; "Ca. A. alterifermentans"; "Ca. A. fermentans"; "Ca. A. hydrocarboniphilus"; A. laminatus

Genus of bacteria

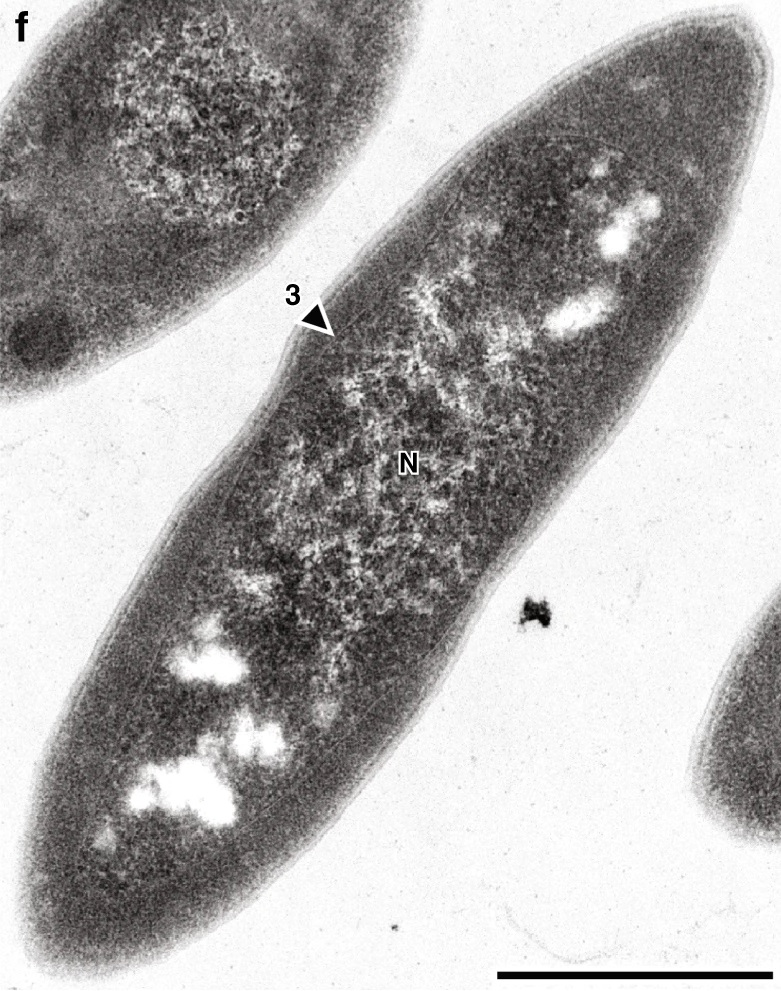
Morphology and membrane structure in Atribacter laminatus (type strain RT761) cells showing the presence of three lipid membrane-like layers with the innermost layer (3) surrounding the nucleoid (N). Scale bar at 0.5 μm.

Atribacter is a genus of bacteria of the candidate phylum Atribacterota with one known species (Atribacter laminatus).

== Phylogeny ==
120 marker proteins based GTDB 10-RS226

- Atribacter
  - - "Ca. A. alterifermentans" Jiao et al. 2024
    - "Ca. A. fermentans" Jiao et al. 2024
  - - "Ca. A. allofermentans" Jiao et al. 2024
    - - "Ca. A. hydrocarboniphilus" Jiao et al. 2024
      - A. laminatus Katayama et al. 2021
