= Food Valley =

Area in the netherlands

Food Valley is a region in the Netherlands where international food companies, research institutes, and Wageningen University and Research Centre are concentrated. The Food Valley area is the home of a large number of food multinationals and within the Food Valley about 15,000 professionals are active in food related sciences and technological development. Far more are involved in the manufacturing of food products. Food Valley, with the city of Wageningen as its center, is intended to form a dynamic heart of knowledge for the international food industry.

Within this region, Foodvalley NL is intended to create conditions so that food manufacturers and knowledge institutes can work together in developing new and innovating food concepts.

== Current research about the Food Valley ==
The Food Valley as a region has been the subject of study by several human geographers. Even before the Food Valley was established as an organisation in 2004 and as a region in 2011 Frank Kraak and Frits Oevering made a SWOT analysis of the region using an Evolutionary economics framework and compared it with similar regions in Canada, Denmark, Italy and Sweden. A similar study was done by Floris Wieberdink. The study utilised Geomarketing concepts in the WERV, the predecessor of the Regio Food Valley. Geijer and Van der Velden studied the economic development of the Regio Food Valley using statistical data.

=== Discussion ===
The research performed in the Food Valley has generated some discussion about the influence of culture on economic growth. Wieberdink argued that culture and habitat are not spatially bounded, but historically. More recently a study about the Food Valley argued that culture and habitat are in fact spatially bounded. Both studies, however, recommend the Regio Food Valley to promote its distinct culture.
