= National Collection of Industrial Food and Marine Bacteria =

Culture collection in the UK

The National Collection of Industrial, Food and Marine Bacteria (NCIMB) is a culture collection in the United Kingdom consisting of microorganisms from environmental samples (particularly marine bacteria) as well as bacteria involved in the production or spoilage of food and drink, and bacteria with important industrial properties. It is a large reference collection and has over 10,000 deposits. Deposits to the collection can be made for research purposes (for example to name a new species), or for inclusion into patent submissions.

Prior to 1982 the collection was one of a number of publicly funded National Collections. The NCIMB collection is now administered by NCIMB Ltd. a private company that maintains public access to the stocks. It is the only privately owned, public collection of bacteria in the UK. NCIMB Ltd. also provides microbiological, chemical, analytical and biomaterial storage services.

== History of the Collection ==
NCIMB has its history in three older public culture collections. In 1959 a merger between the National Collection of Industrial Bacteria (NCIB, established in 1950 at the Chemical Research Laboratory in Teddington) and the National Collection of Marine Bacteria (NCMB, established in 1957 at the Torry Research Station in Aberdeen) created the forerunner of the modern collection, the National Collection of Industrial and Marine Bacteria. The collection was curated by Professor James Shewan from 1959 to 1974. When support from the Scientific Civil Service was withdrawn the collection was transferred to the University of Aberdeen and was supported by the Biotechnology and Biological Sciences Research Council (BBSRC) after recommendations from the Office of Science and Technology (OST). The BBSRC continued to supply some level of funding to the collection until 2013.

NCIMB Ltd. was created as a wholly owned subsidiary of Aberdeen University Industrial Services (AURIS) in 1982 and the transition to a private company was overseen by Dr Ivan Bousefield, the curator from 1974-1990. At this time the company also became an International Depository Authority (IDA) under the Budapest Treaty, and began storing plant seeds, plasmids, fungi and microorganisms that need to be filed alongside patent applications. Patent deposits are referenced in the patent application and can be furnished by the IDA on request.

Under Dr Peter Green, the curator from 1990-2013, the National Collection of Food Bacteria (NCFB) was moved to NCIMB in 1993 to form the core of the modern collection. This was a result of the Government's response to the OST review, that suggested the NCFB no longer met the needs of the Ministry of Agriculture, Fisheries and Food (MAFF). In 2000, NCIMB Ltd. was fully spun out from the university and became an independent, privately held company.

NCIMB Ltd. continues to manage the National Collection of Industrial, Food and Marine Bacteria under the direction of Dr Samantha Law, the current curator.
