= Raftilose =

Raftilose is the trade name for a prebiotic fructooligosaccharide (FOS) derived from inulin produced by Orafti and Palatinit, subsidiaries of Südzucker. It consists of fructose oligomers, and sometimes a terminal glucose.
