= Chrysiogenes arsenatis =

Scientific classification
- Domain: Bacteria
- Kingdom: Pseudomonadati
- Phylum: Chrysiogenota
- Class: Chrysiogenia
- Order: Chrysiogenales
- Family: Chrysiogenaceae
- Genus: Chrysiogenes; Macy et al., 1996
- Species: C. arsenatis

Binomial name
- Chrysiogenes arsenatis Macy et al., 1996

Species of bacterium

Chrysiogenes arsenatis is a species of bacterium in the family Chrysiogenaceae. It has a unique biochemistry. Instead of respiring with oxygen, it respires using the most oxidized form of arsenic, arsenate. It uses arsenate as its terminal electron acceptor. Arsenic is usually toxic to life. Bacteria like Chrysiogenes arsenatis are found in anoxic arsenic-contaminated environments.

== See also ==
- List of bacterial orders
- List of bacteria genera
