= European Collection of Authenticated Cell Cultures =

English-based organization

The European Collection of Authenticated Cell Cultures (ECACC) houses and supplies cell lines.

It is part of the Culture Collections of Public Health England. The collection is held in Porton Down.

ECACC, which was established in 1984, consists of a team with specialist knowledge which supply authenticated cell lines, induced Pluripotent stem cells (iPSCs) and nucleic acids to provide stock for the research community. ECACC is one of the first collections of authenticated cell cultures worldwide and now holds cell lines from 45 species including 50 tissue types, 300 HLA types, over 800 genetic disorders and roughly 450 monoclonal antibodies.

ECACC products are trademarked with Public Health England and the trademark cannot be used without a licence agreement which can be requested through contact with PHE Culture Collections. All ECACC products can be found at the culture collections website alongside a range of services such as Mycoplasma testing and training courses for cell culture.
