= Chrysiogenaceae =

Scientific classification
- Domain: Bacteria
- Kingdom: Pseudomonadati
- Phylum: Chrysiogenota; Garrity and Holt 2021
- Class: Chrysiogenia corrig. Garrity and Holt 2002
- Order: Chrysiogenales; Garrity and Holt 2002
- Family: Chrysiogenaceae; Garrity and Holt 2002

Genera
- Chrysiogenes; Desulfurispira; Desulfurispirillum

Synonyms
- Chrysiogenota: "Chrysiogenetes" Garrity and Holt 2001; "Chrysiogenetota" Whitman et al. 2018; "Chrysiogenaeota" Oren et al. 2015

Family of bacteria

Chrysiogenaceae is a family of bacteria.

== Phylogeny ==
16S rRNA based LTP_10_2024

- - Chrysiogenes arsenatis Macy et al. 1996
  - - Desulfurispirillum indicum Rauschenbach et al. 2011
    - - Desulfurispirillum alkaliphilum Sorokin et al. 2010 (type sp.)
      - Desulfurispira natronophila Sorokin and Muyzer 2010

120 marker proteins based GTDB 10-RS226

- - Chrysiogenes arsenatis
  - - Desulfurispirillum indicum
    - Desulfurispira natronophila

== See also ==
- List of bacterial orders
- List of bacteria genera
