= Branching order of bacterial phyla (Cavalier-Smith, 2002) =

There are several models of the Branching order of bacterial phyla, one of these was proposed in 2002 and 2004 by Thomas Cavalier-Smith. In this frame of work, the branching order of the major lineage of bacteria are determined based on some morphological characters, such as cell wall structure, and not based on the molecular evidence (molecular phylogeny).

Whereas modern molecular studies point towards the root of the tree of life being between a monophyletic Bacteria and Archaea+Eukarya (Neomura), in the Cavalier-Smith theory, the last common ancestor (cenancestor) was a Gram-negative diderm bacterium with peptidoglycan, while Archaea and Eukaryotes stem from Actinobacteria.

- LUA
  - Chlorobacteria (accepted name = Chloroflexi)
  - - Hadobacteria (= Deinococcus-Thermus group)
    - Glycobacteria
      - Cyanobacteria
      - - Gracilicutes
          - Spirochaetae
          - - Sphingobacteria
              - Fibrobacteres
              - - Chlorobi
                - Bacteroidetes
            - - Planctobacteria
                - Planctomycetes
                - - Chlamydiae
                  - - Lentisphaerae
                    - Verrucomicrobia
              - Proteobacteria
                - Geobacteria
                  - Deferribacteres
                  - Acidobacteria
                - Thiobacteria
                  - Deltaproteobacteria
                  - Epsilonproteobacteria
                - Rhodobacteria
                  - Alphaproteobacteria
                  - Chromatibacteria
                    - Betaproteobacteria
                    - Gammaproteobacteria
        - Unibacteria
          - Eurybacteria
            - Thermotogae
            - Fusobacteria
            - Negativicutes
          - - Endobacteria (=Firmicutes, Mollicutes)
            - - Actinobacteria
              - Neomura
                - Archaea
                - Eukarya

== See also ==
- Branching order of bacterial phyla (Woese, 1987)
- Branching order of bacterial phyla (Rappe and Giovanoni, 2003)
- Branching order of bacterial phyla after ARB Silva Living Tree
- Branching order of bacterial phyla (Ciccarelli et al., 2006)
- Branching order of bacterial phyla (Battistuzzi et al., 2004)
- Branching order of bacterial phyla (Gupta, 2001)
- Branching order of bacterial phyla (Cavalier-Smith, 2002)
