= Branching order of bacterial phyla (Battistuzzi et al., 2004) =

There are several models of the Branching order of bacterial phyla, one of these was proposed in 2004 by Battistuzzi and Hedges, note the coinage of the taxa Terrabacteria and Hydrobacteria.

- Archaea
- - Thermotogae
  - - Aquificae
    - - Fusobacteria
      - - Terrabacteria
          - - Actinobacteria
            - Deinococcus-Thermus
          - - Firmicutes
            - - Chloroflexi
              - Cyanobacteria
        - Hydrobacteria
          - Polyphyletic PVC group
            - - Planctomycetes
              - Spirochaetes
            - - Chlamydiae
              - FCB group
                - Bacteroidetes
                - Chlorobi
          - Paraphyletic Proteobacteria
            - Epsilonproteobacteria
            - - - Deltaproteobacteria
                - Solibacteres
              - - Alphaproteobacteria
                - - Betaproteobacteria
                  - Gammaproteobacteria

== See also ==
- Branching order of bacterial phyla (Woese, 1987)
- Branching order of bacterial phyla (Rappe and Giovanoni, 2003)
- Branching order of bacterial phyla after ARB Silva Living Tree
- Branching order of bacterial phyla (Ciccarelli et al., 2006)
- Branching order of bacterial phyla (Battistuzzi et al., 2004)
- Branching order of bacterial phyla (Gupta, 2001)
- Branching order of bacterial phyla (Cavalier-Smith, 2002)
