= Caldisericum =

Scientific classification
- Domain: Bacteria
- Kingdom: Pseudomonadati
- Phylum: Caldisericota
- Class: Caldisericia
- Order: Caldisericales
- Family: Caldisericaceae
- Genus: Caldisericum; Mori et al. 2009

Type species
- Caldisericum exile Mori et al. 2009

Species
- C. exile

Synonyms
- Caldisericota Mori et al. 2021: "Caldiserica" Mori et al. 2009; "Caldisericota" Whitman et al. 2018; "Caldisericaeota" Oren et al. 2015; Candidate phylum OP5

Genus of bacteria

Caldisericum exile is a species of bacteria sufficiently distinct from other bacteria to be placed in its own family, order, class and phylum. It is the first member of the thermophilic candidate phylum OP5 to be cultured and described.

== See also ==
- List of bacteria genera
- List of bacterial orders
