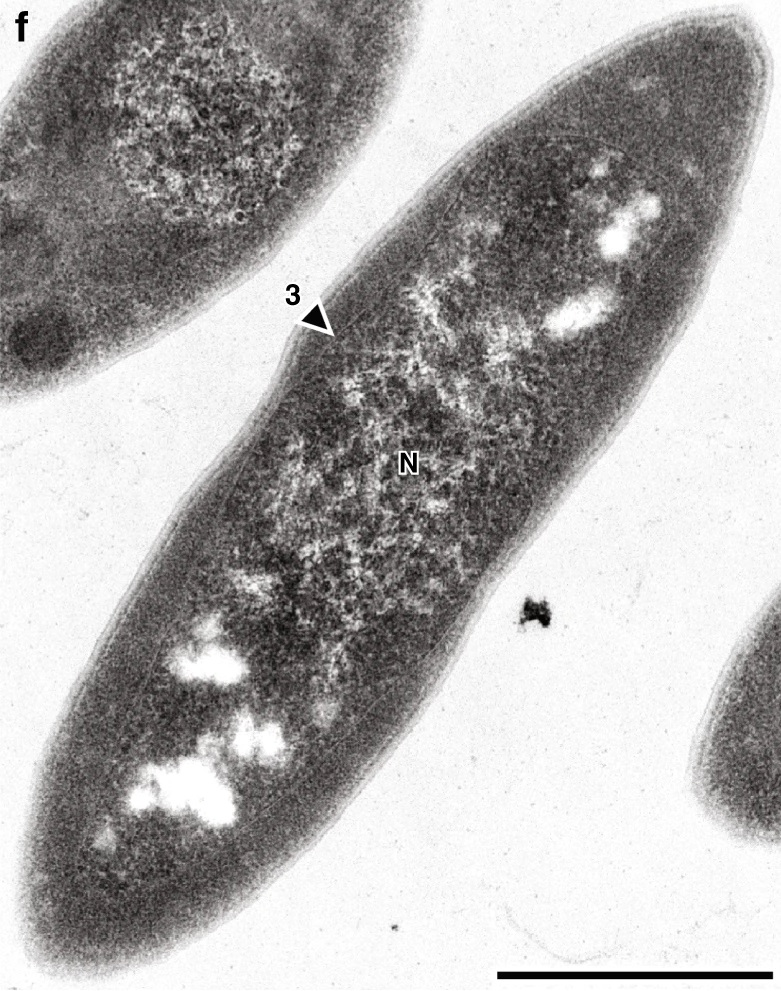
- Morphology and membrane structure in Atribacter laminatus (type strain RT761)

Scientific classification
- Domain: Bacteria
- Kingdom: Pseudomonadati
- Phylum: Atribacterota; Katayama et al. 2021

Classes
- Atribacteria; "Phoenicimicrobiia"

Synonyms
- "Ca. Atribacteria" Dodsworth et al. 2013; "Atribacterota" Katayama et al. 2020; "Caldatribacteriota" Hahn et al. 2020

= Atribacterota =

Phylum of bacteria

Atribacterota is a phylum of bacteria, which are common in anoxic sediments rich in methane. They are distributed worldwide and in some cases abundant in anaerobic marine sediments, geothermal springs, and oil deposits. Genetic analyses suggest a heterotrophic metabolism that gives rise to fermentation products such as acetate, ethanol, and CO_{2}. These products in turn can support methanogens within the sediment microbial community and explain the frequent occurrence of Atribacterota in methane-rich anoxic sediments. According to phylogenetic analysis, Atribacterota appears to be related to several thermophilic phyla within Pseudomonadati. According to research, Atribacterota shows patterns of gene expressions which consists of fermentative, acetogenic metabolism. These expressions let Atribacterota to be able to create catabolic and anabolic functions which are necessary to generate cellular reproduction, even when the energy levels are limited due to the depletion of dissolved oxygen in the areas of sea waters, fresh waters, or ground waters.

== Classification ==
=== Phylogeny ===
120 marker proteins based GTDB 10-RS226

- - "Phoenicimicrobiia"
    - "Phoenicimicrobiales"
      - "Stramentimicrobiaceae"
        - "Ca. Stramentimicrobium"
        - "Ca. Oleincola"
      - "Phoenicimicrobiaceae"
        - "Ca. Immundihabitans"
        - - "Ca. Infernicultor"
          - "Ca. Sediminicultor"
  - Atribacteria
    - Atribacterales
      - Atribacteraceae
        - "Ca. Nitricultor"
        - Atribacter
      - - Thermatribacteraceae
          Thermatribacter
        - "Caldatribacteriaceae"
          - "Ca. Sordicultor"
          - - "Ca. Profundicultor"
            - "Ca. Caldatribacterium"

=== Taxonomy ===
National Center for Biotechnology Information (NCBI) taxonomy and List of Prokaryotic names with Standing in Nomenclature (LPSN) were used as the primary taxonomic authority for establishing naming priorities. Also Annotree website, which uses the GTDB release 06-RS202. was consulted.

- "Class Phoenicimicrobiia" Jiao et al. 2024 [JS1]
  - Order "Phoenicimicrobiales" Jiao et al. 2024 [SB-45]
    - Family "Stramentimicrobiaceae" Jiao et al. 2024
      - Genus ?"Candidatus Oleihabitans" Jiao et al. 2024 [R3-B20]
      - Genus "Candidatus Oleincola" Jiao et al. 2024 [M55B131]
      - Genus "Candidatus Stramentimicrobium" Jiao et al. 2024 [JAAYOB01]
    - Family "Phoenicimicrobiaceae" Jiao et al. 2024 [34-128]
      - Genus "Candidatus Immundihabitans" Jiao et al. 2024 [UBA5772]
      - Genus "Candidatus Infernicultor" Jiao et al. 2024 [CG2-30-33-13]
      - Genus ?"Candidatus Phoenicimicrobium" Jiao et al. 2024
      - Genus "Candidatus Sediminicultor" Jiao et al. 2024 [UBA9311]
- Class Atribacteria Katayama et al. 2021
  - Order Atribacterales Katayama et al. 2021
    - Family Atrimonadaceae Kawamoto et al. 2024
      - Genus ?Atrimonas Kawamoto et al. 2024
    - Family Thermatribacteraceae Jiao et al. 2024
      - Genus Thermatribacter Jiao et al. 2024
    - Family Atribacteraceae Katayama et al. 2021 (OP9)
      - Genus Atribacter Katayama et al. 2021
      - Genus "Candidatus Nitricultor" Jiao et al. 2024 [SKXZ01]
    - Family "Caldatribacteriaceae"
      - Genus "Candidatus Caldatribacterium" Dodsworth et al. 2013
      - Genus "Candidatus Profundicultor" Jiao et al. 2024 [JABUEZ01]
      - Genus "Candidatus Sordicultor" Jiao et al. 2024 [UBA3950]

== See also ==
- List of bacterial orders
- List of bacteria genera
