= Caldithrix =

Scientific classification
- Domain: Bacteria
- Kingdom: Pseudomonadati
- Phylum: Calditrichota; Kublanov et al. 2021
- Class: Calditrichia; Kublanov et al. 2022
- Order: Calditrichales; Kublanov et al. 2020
- Family: Calditrichaceae; Kublanov et al. 2020
- Genus: Caldithrix; Miroshnichenko et al. 2003

Type species
- Caldithrix abyssi Miroshnichenko et al. 2003

Species
- C. abyssi; C. palaeochoryensis

Synonyms
- Calditrichota: "Calditrichaeota" Kublanov et al. 2017; "Calditrichota" Youssef et al. 2019; "Calditrichae": "Calditrichia" Cavalier-Smith 2020

Genus of bacteria

Caldithrix is a genus of thermophilic and anaerobic bacteria, currently assigned to its own phylum.

== See also ==
- List of bacterial orders
- List of bacteria genera
