= Lentisphaerota =

Scientific classification
- Domain: Bacteria
- Kingdom: Pseudomonadati
- Superphylum: "PVC"
- Phylum: Lentisphaerota; Cho et al. 2021

Classes
- Oligosphaeria; Lentisphaeria

Synonyms
- "Lentisphaerae" Cho et al. 2004; "Lentisphaeraeota" Oren et al. 2015; "Lentisphaerota" Whitman et al. 2018

Phylum of bacteria

Lentisphaerota is a phylum of bacteria closely related to Chlamydiota and Verrucomicrobiota.

It includes two monotypic orders Lentisphaerales and Victivallales. Phylum members can be aerobic or anaerobic and fall under two distinct phenotypes. These phenotypes live within bodies of sea water and were particularly hard to isolate in pure culture. One phenotype, L. marina, consists of terrestrial gut microbiota from mammals and birds. It was found in the Sea of Japan. The other phenotype (L. araneosa) includes marine microorganisms: sequences from fish and coral microbiomes and marine sediment.

== Phylogeny ==
The phylogeny based on the work of the All-Species Living Tree Project.

- - Oligosphaera ethanolica
  - - Victivallis vadensis
    - Lentisphaera
      - L. araneosa
      - L. marina

== Taxonomy ==
The currently accepted taxonomy is based on the List of Prokaryotic names with Standing in Nomenclature (LSPN) and the National Center for Biotechnology Information (NCBI).

- Phylum Lentisphaerota Cho et al. 2021
  - Class Oligosphaeria Qiu et al. 2013
    - Order Oligosphaerales Qiu et al. 2013
      - Family Oligosphaeraceae Qiu et al. 2013
        - Genus Oligosphaera Qiu et al. 2013
          - Species Oligosphaera ethanolica Qiu et al. 2013
  - Class Lentisphaeria Cho et al. 2012
    - Order Victivallales Cho et al. 2004
      - Family Victivallaceae Derrien et al. 2012
        - Genus Victivallis Zoetendal et al. 2003
          - Species Victivallis vadensis Zoetendal et al. 2003
    - Order Lentisphaerales Cho et al. 2004
      - Family Lentisphaeraceae Cho & Hedlund 2012
        - Genus Lentisphaera Cho et al. 2004 emend. Choi et al. 2013
          - Species L. araneosa Cho et al. 2004
          - Species L. marina Choi et al. 2013
          - Species "L. profunda" ♠

Notes:
♠ Strain found at the National Center for Biotechnology Information (NCBI) but not listed in the List of Prokaryotic names with Standing in Nomenclature (LPSN)

== See also ==
- List of bacterial orders
