= Gemmatimonadota =

Scientific classification
- Domain: Bacteria
- Kingdom: Pseudomonadati
- Phylum: Gemmatimonadota; Zhang et al. 2021

Classes
- Gemmatimonadetes; Longimicrobia

Synonyms
- "Gemmatimonadaeota" Oren et al. 2015; "Gemmatimonadota" Whitman et al. 2018; "Gemmatimonadetes" Zhang et al. 2003

Phylum of bacteria

The Gemmatimonadota are a phylum of bacteria established in 2003. The phylum contains two classes Gemmatimonadetes and Longimicrobia.

== Species ==
The type species Gemmatimonas aurantiaca strain T-27^{T} was isolated from activated sludge in a sewage treatment system in 2003. It is a Gram-negative bacterium able to grow by both aerobic and anaerobic respiration.

The second cultured species was Gemmatirosa kalamazoonensis gen. nov., sp. nov. strain KBS708, which was isolated from organically managed agricultural soil in Michigan USA.

The third cultured species Gemmatimonas phototrophica strain AP64^{T} was isolated from a shallow freshwater desert lake Tiān é hú (Swan Lake) in North China. A unique feature of this organism is the presence of bacterial photosynthetic reaction centers. It probably acquired genes for anoxygenic photosynthesis via horizontal gene transfer. G. phototrophica is a facultative photoheterotrophic organism. It requires the supply of organic substrate for growth, but it may obtain additional energy for its metabolism from light.

Longimicrobium terrae strain CB-286315T was isolated from a soil sample from a typical Mediterranean forest ecosystem located in Granada, Spain. Due to this large phylogenetic distance from other cultured Gemmatimonades, it established a novel class named Longimicrobia.

== Environmental distribution ==
Data from culture-independent studies indicate that Gemmatimonadota are widely distributed in many natural habitats. They make up about 2% of soil bacterial communities and has been identified as one of the top nine phyla found in soils; yet, there are currently only six cultured isolates. Gemmatimonadota have been found in a variety of arid soils, such as grassland, prairie, and pasture soil, as well as eutrophic lake sediments and alpine soils. This wide range of environments where Gemmatimonadota have been found suggests an adaptation to low soil moisture. A study conducted showed that the distribution of the Gemmatimonadota in soil tends to be more dependent on the moisture availability than aggregation, reinforcing the belief that the members of this phylum prefer dryer soils. Smaller numbers were also found in various aquatic environments, such as fresh waters and sediments, and in meadows and cropland located in boreal ecosystems .

== Phylogeny ==
16S rRNA based LTP_10_2024

- - Longimicrobia
    - Longimicrobiales Longimicrobiaceae
      Longimicrobium
  - "Gemmatimonadia"
    - Gemmatimonadales Gemmatimonadaceae
      - - Gemmatirosa
        - Roseisolibacter
      - Gemmatimonas

120 marker proteins based GTDB 10-RS226

- - "Glassbacteria" (RIF5)
  - - "Gemmatimonadia"
      - - Gemmatimonadales Gemmatimonadaceae
          - - Gemmatirosa
            - Roseisolibacter
          - - "Pseudogemmatithrix"
            - Gemmatimonas
      - - Longimicrobiales Longimicrobiaceae
          Longimicrobium
        - "Palauibacterales"
          - KS3‑K002
            - "Ca. Indicimonas"
            - "Ca. Kutchimonas"
          - "Palauibacteraceae"
            - - "Ca. Caribbeanibacter"
              - "Ca. Humimonas"
            - - - "Ca. Carthagonibacter"
                - "Ca. Benthicola"
              - "Ca. Palauibacter"

== Taxonomy ==
The currently accepted taxonomy is based on the List of Prokaryotic names with Standing in Nomenclature (LSPN) and National Center for Biotechnology Information (NCBI).

- Class Gemmatimonadetes Zhang et al. 2003 ["Gemmatimonadia" Oren, Parte & Garrity 2016 ex Cavalier-Smith 2020; Longimicrobia Pascual et al. 2016]
  - Order Gaopeijiales Ye et al. 2025
    - Family Gaopeijiaceae Ye et al. 2025
      - Genus ?Gaopeijia Ye et al. 2025
  - Order Gemmatimonadales Zhang et al. 2003
    - Family Gemmatimonadaceae Zhang et al. 2003
      - Genus Gemmatimonas Zhang et al. 2003 em. Zeng et al. 2015
      - Genus "Gemmatirosa" DeBruyn et al. 2013
      - Genus Roseisolibacter Pascual et al. 2018
      - Genus "Pseudogemmatithrix" Haufschild et al. 2024
  - Order Longimicrobiales Pascual et al. 2016
    - Family Longimicrobiaceae Pascual et al. 2016
      - Genus Longimicrobium Pascual et al. 2016
  - Order "Palaucibacterales" Aldeguer-Riquelme, Antón & Santos 2022 [PAUC43f]
    - Family Palauibacteraceae Aldeguer-Riquelme, Antón & Santos 2023
      - Genus "Ca. Benthicola" Aldeguer-Riquelme, Antón & Santos 2023
      - Genus "Ca. Caribbeanibacter" Aldeguer-Riquelme, Antón & Santos 2023
      - Genus "Ca. Carthagonibacter" Aldeguer-Riquelme, Antón & Santos 2023
      - Genus "Ca. Humimonas" Aldeguer-Riquelme, Antón & Santos 2023
      - Genus "Ca. Indicimonas" Aldeguer-Riquelme, Antón & Santos 2023
      - Genus "Ca. Kutchimonas" Aldeguer-Riquelme, Antón & Santos 2023
      - Genus "Ca. Palauibacter" Aldeguer-Riquelme, Antón & Santos 2023

== See also ==
- List of bacterial orders
- List of bacteria genera
