= List of restriction enzyme cutting sites: E–F =

Legend of nucleobases
Code	Nucleotide represented
A	Adenine (A)
C	Cytosine (C)
G	Guanine (G)
T	Thymine (T)
N	A, C, G or T
M	A or C
R	A or G
W	A or T
Y	C or T
S	C or G
K	G or T
H	A, C or T
B	C, G or T
V	A, C or G
D	A, G or T

This article contains a list of the most studied restriction enzymes whose names start with E to F inclusive. It contains approximately 110 enzymes.

The following information is given:

- Enzyme: Accepted name of the molecule, according to the internationally adopted nomenclature, and bibliographical references. (Further reading: see the section "Nomenclature" in the article "Restriction enzyme".)
- PDB code: Code used to identify the structure of a protein in the PDB database of protein structures. The 3D atomic structure of a protein provides highly valuable information to understand the intimate details of its mechanism of action.
- Source: Organism that naturally produces the enzyme.
- Recognition sequence: Sequence of DNA recognized by the enzyme and to which it specifically binds.
- Cut: Cutting site and DNA products of the cut. The recognition sequence and the cutting site usually match, but sometimes the cutting site can be dozens of nucleotides away from the recognition site.
- Isoschizomers and neoschizomers: An isoschizomer is an enzyme that recognizes the same sequence as another. A neoschizomer is a special type of isoschizomer that recognizes the same sequence as another, but cuts in a different manner. A maximum number of 8-10 most common isoschizomers are indicated for every enzyme but there may be many more. Neoschizomers are shown in bold and green color font (e.g.: **BamHI**). When "None on date" is indicated, that means that there were no registered isoschizomers in the databases on that date with a clearly defined cutting site. Isoschizomers indicated in white font and grey background correspond to enzymes not listed in the current lists:

as in this not listed enzyme:	EcoR70I

== Restriction enzymes ==
=== E ===
**Enzyme**	**PDB code**	Source	**Recognition sequence**	**Cut**	**Isoschizomers**
EacI		Eubacterium acidaminophilum	5' GGATC; 3' CCTAG	5' ---GGATCNNNN N--- 3'; 3' ---CCTAGNNNNN --- 5'	AclWI, AlwI, BinI, / BpuFI, / BspPI, BstH9I, / Bst31TI, Bth617I, Ral8I
EaeI		Enterobacter aerogenes	5' YGGCCR; 3' RCCGGY	5' ---Y GGCCR--- 3'; 3' ---RCCGG Y--- 5'
Eae46I		Enterobacter aerogenes 46	5' CCGCGG; 3' GGCGCC	5' ---CCGC GG--- 3'; 3' ---GG CGCC--- 5'
EaeAI		Enterobacter aerogenes	5' CCCGGG; 3' GGGCCC	5' ---C CCGGG--- 3'; 3' ---GGGCC C--- 5'	AhyI, Cfr9I, EclRI, **PaeBI**, PspAI, **PspALI**, XcyI, XmaI, XmaCI
EagI		Enterobacter agglomerans	5' CGGCCG; 3' GCCGGC	5' ---C GGCCG--- 3'; 3' ---GCCGG C--- 5'	AaaI, BseX3I, BstZI, EclXI, Eco52I, SenPT16I, XmaIII
EagBI		Enterobacter agglomerans CBNU45	5' CGATCG; 3' GCTAGC	5' ---CGAT CG--- 3'; 3' ---GC TAGC--- 5'	Afa16RI, Afa22MI, BspCI, ErhB9I, NblI, Psu161I, RshI, XorII
EagMI		Enterobacter agglomerans M3	5' GGWCC; 3' CCWGG	5' ---G GWCC--- 3'; 3' ---CCWG G--- 5'	Bme18I, BsrAI, Csp68KI, Eco47I, FssI, HgiEI, Kzo49I, SmuEI
Eam1104I		Enterobacter amnigenus RFL1104	5' CTCTTC; 3' GAGAAG	5' ---CTCTTCN NNN--- 3'; 3' ---GAGAAGNNNN --- 5'
Eam1105I		Enterobacter amnigenus RFL1105	5' GACN_{5}GTC; 3' CTGN_{5}CAG	5' ---GACNNN NNGTC--- 3'; 3' ---CTGNN NNNCAG--- 5'	AhdI, AspEI, / BmeRI, / BspOVI, DriI, EclHKI, NruGI
EarI		Enterobacter aerogenes	5' CTCTTC; 3' GAGAAG	5' ---CTCTTCN NNN--- 3'; 3' ---GAGAAGNNNN --- 5'
EcaI		Enterobacter cloacae	5' GGTNACC; 3' CCANTGG	5' ---G GTNACC--- 3'; 3' ---CCANTG G--- 5'	AcrII, Bse64I, BseT10I, BstEII, Eco91I, EcoO65I, EcoO128I
EciI		Escherichia coli	5' GGCGGA; 3' CCGCCT	5' ---GGCGGAN_{8}NNN --- 3'; 3' ---CCGCCTN_{8}N NN--- 5'
Eci125I		Escherichia coli VKM-125	5' GGTNACC; 3' CCANTGG	5' ---G GTNACC--- 3'; 3' ---CCANTG G--- 5'	AcrII, AspAI, BseT10I, BstEII, Eco91I, EcoO65I, EcoO128I
EclI		Enterobacter cloacae	5' CAGCTG; 3' GTCGAC	5' ---CAG CTG--- 3'; 3' ---GTC GAC--- 5'
Ecl136II		Enterobacter cloacae RFL136	5' GAGCTC; 3' CTCGAG	5' ---GAG CTC--- 3'; 3' ---CTC GAG--- 5'
EclHKI		Enterobacter cloacae	5' GACN_{5}GTC; 3' CTGN_{5}CAG	5' ---GACNNN NNGTC--- 3'; 3' ---CTGNN NNNCAG--- 5'	AhdI, AspEI, / BmeRI, / BspOVI, DriI, Eam1105I, NruGI
EclRI		Enterobacter cloacae R	5' CCCGGG; 3' GGGCCC	5' ---C CCGGG--- 3'; 3' ---GGGCC C--- 5'	AhyI, Cfr9I, EaeAI, Pac25I, PspAI, **PspALI**, XcyI, XmaI, XmaCI
EclXI		Enterobacter cloacae 590	5' CGGCCG; 3' GCCGGC	5' ---C GGCCG--- 3'; 3' ---GCCGG C--- 5'	AaaI, BseX3I, BstZI, EagI, Eco52I, SenPT16I, XmaIII
Ecl18kI	2FQZ	Enterobacter cloacae 18k	5' CCNGG; 3' GGNCC	5' --- CCNGG--- 3'; 3' ---GGNCC --- 5'
Ecl37kI		Enterobacter cloacae 37k	5' CTGCAG; 3' GACGTC	5' ---CTGCA G--- 3'; 3' ---G ACGTC--- 5'	AjoI, AliAJI, Ecl2zI, PaePI, Psp23I, PstI, Sag16I, SflI, YenI
Ecl2zI		Enterobacter cloacae 2z	5' CTGCAG; 3' GACGTC	5' ---CTGCA G--- 3'; 3' ---G ACGTC--- 5'	AliAJI, Bsp63I, CfrA4I, PaePI, Pfl21I, PstI, SflI, Sst12I, YenI
Eco24I		Escherichia coli RFL24	5' GRGCYC; 3' CYCGRG	5' ---GRGCY C--- 3'; 3' ---C YCGRG--- 5'
Eco31I		Escherichia coli RFL31	5' GGTCTC; 3' CCAGAG	5' ---GGTCTCN NNNN--- 3'; 3' ---CCAGAGNNNNN --- 5'
Eco32I		Escherichia coli RFL32	5' GATATC; 3' CTATAG	5' ---GAT ATC--- 3'; 3' ---CTA TAG--- 5'
Eco47I		Escherichia coli RFL47	5' GGWCC; 3' CCWGG	5' ---G GWCC--- 3'; 3' ---CCWG G--- 5'	Bme18I, BsrAI, Csp68KI, ErpI, FssI, HgiEI, Kzo49I, SmuEI
Eco47III		Escherichia coli RFL47	5' AGCGCT; 3' TCGCGA	5' ---AGC GCT--- 3'; 3' ---TCG CGA--- 5'	AfeI, AitI, Aor51H, FunI
Eco52I		Escherichia coli RFL52	5' CGGCCG; 3' GCCGGC	5' ---C GGCCG--- 3'; 3' ---GCCGG C--- 5'	AaaI, BseX3I, BstZI, EagI, EclXI, SenPT16I, XmaIII
Eco56I		Escherichia coli RFL56	5' GCCGGC; 3' CGGCCG	5' ---G CCGGC--- 3'; 3' ---CGGCC G--- 5'
Eco57I		Escherichia coli RFL57	5' CTGAAG; 3' GACTTC	5' ---CTGAAGN_{12}NNNN --- 3'; 3' ---GACTTCN_{12}NN NN--- 5'	AcuI, BspKT5I
Eco64I		Escherichia coli RFL64	5' GGYRCC; 3' CCRYGG	5' ---G GYRCC--- 3'; 3' ---CCRYG G--- 5'	BanI, BbvBI, BspT107I, BshNI, HgiCI, HgiHI, MspB4I, PfaAI
Eco72I		Escherichia coli RFL72	5' CACGTG; 3' GTGCAC	5' ---CAC GTG--- 3'; 3' ---GTG CAC--- 5'	AcvI, BcoAI, BbrPI, PmaCI, PmlI, PspCI
Eco78I		Escherichia coli RFL78	5' GGCGCC; 3' CCGCGG	5' ---GGC GCC--- 3'; 3' ---CCG CGG--- 5'
Eco81I		Escherichia coli RFL81	5' CCTNAGG; 3' GGANTCC	5' ---CC TNAGG--- 3'; 3' ---GGANT CC--- 5'	AxyI, Bse21I, BspR7I, Bsu36I, Eco81I, MstII, OxaNI, SshAI
Eco88I		Escherichia coli RFL88	5' CYCGRG; 3' GRGCYC	5' ---C YCGRG--- 3'; 3' ---GRGCY C--- 5'	AquI, BcoI, BsiHKCI, BstSI, Eco27kI, NspSAI, PlaAI, PunAI
Eco91I		Escherichia coli RFL91	5' GGTNACC; 3' CCANTGG	5' ---G GTNACC--- 3'; 3' ---CCANTG G--- 5'	Bse64I, BstEII, BstPI, BstT9I, BstT10I, EcaI, Eci125I, NspSAII
Eco105I		Escherichia coli RFL105	5' TACGTA; 3' ATGCAT	5' ---TAC GTA--- 3'; 3' ---ATG CAT--- 5'
Eco130I		Escherichia coli RFL130	5' CCWWGG; 3' GGWWCC	5' ---C CWWGG--- 3'; 3' ---GGWWC C--- 5'
Eco147I		Escherichia coli RFL147	5' AGGCCT; 3' TCCGGA	5' ---AGG CCT--- 3'; 3' ---TCC GGA--- 5'	AatI, AspMI, GdiI, PceI, Pme55I, SarI, Sru30DI, SseBI, SteI, StuI
Eco255I		Escherichia coli RFL255	5' AGTACT; 3' TCATGA	5' ---AGT ACT--- 3'; 3' ---TCA TGA--- 5'	Acc113I, AssI, / BmcAI, Bpa34I, DpaI, RflFII, ScaI, ZrmI
Eco1831I		Escherichia coli RFL1831	5' CCSGG; 3' GGSCC	5' --- CCSGG--- 3'; 3' ---GGSCC --- 5'	**AhaI**, **AseII**, **AsuC2I**, **BcnI**, **BpuMI**, / **CauII**, EcoHI, **HgiS22I**
EcoA4I		Escherichia coli A4	5' GGTCTC; 3' CCAGAG	5' ---GGTCTCN NNNN--- 3'; 3' ---CCAGAGNNNNN --- 5'
EcoHI		Escherichia coli HI	5' CCSGG; 3' GGSCC	5' --- CCSGG--- 3'; 3' ---GGSCC --- 5'	**AsuC2I**, **BcnI**, **BpuMI**, **CauII**, EcoHI, **HgiS22I**, Kpn49kII, **NciI**
EcoHK31I		Escherichia coli HK31	5' YGGCCR; 3' RCCGGY	5' ---Y GGCCR--- 3'; 3' ---RCCGG Y--- 5'
EcoICRI		Escherichia coli 2bT	5' GAGCTC; 3' CTCGAG	5' ---GAG CTC--- 3'; 3' ---CTC GAG--- 5'
Eco75KI		Escherichia coli BKM	5' GRGCYC; 3' CYCGRG	5' ---GRGCY C--- 3'; 3' ---C YCGRG--- 5'
Eco57MI		Escherichia coli RFL57M	5' CTGRAG; 3' GACYTC	5' ---CTGRAGN_{12}NNNN --- 3'; 3' ---GACYTCN_{12}NN NN--- 5'
EcoNI		Escherichia coli	5' CCTN_{5}AGG; 3' GGAN_{5}TCC	5' ---CCTNN NNNAGG--- 3'; 3' ---GGANNN NNTCC--- 5'
EcoO44I		Escherichia coli O44 Hiromi	5' GGTCTC; 3' CCAGAG	5' ---GGTCTCN NNNN--- 3'; 3' ---CCAGAGNNNNN --- 5'
EcoO65I		Escherichia coli K11a	5' GGTNACC; 3' CCANTGG	5' ---G GTNACC--- 3'; 3' ---CCANTG G--- 5'	AcrII, Bse64I, BstEII, BstPI, BstT9I, EcaI, Eco91I, EcoO128I
EcoO109I	1WTD	Escherichia coli H709c	5' RGGNCCY; 3' YCCNGGR	5' ---RG GNCCY--- 3'; 3' ---YCCNG GR--- 5'
EcoO128I		Escherichia coli O128Ly3	5' GGTNACC; 3' CCANTGG	5' ---G GTNACC--- 3'; 3' ---CCANTG G--- 5'	AspAI, Bse64I, BstEII, BstT9I, EcaI, EcoO65I, NspSAII, PspEI
EcoP15I		Escherichia coli P15	5' CAGCAG; 3' GTCGTC	5' ---CAGCAGN_{25}NN --- 3'; 3' ---GTCGTCN_{25} NN--- 5'
EcoR124II	2y3t, 2w74 Search	Escherichia coli	5' 5'-GAAN_{7}RTCG-3'	5'
EcoRI	1QC9, Search EcoR1 structures	Escherichia coli RY13	5' GAATTC; 3' CTTAAG	5' ---G AATTC--- 3'; 3' ---CTTAA G--- 5'
EcoRII	1NA6	Escherichia coli R245	5' CCWGG; 3' GGWCC	5' --- CCWGG--- 3'; 3' ---GGWCC --- 5'	ApaORI, BseBI, BspNI, BstNI, BstOI, Bst2UI, MvaI, **SspAI**, ZanI
EcoRV	1RVE Search EcoRV	Escherichia coli J62 pLG74	5' GATATC; 3' CTATAG	5' ---GAT ATC--- 3'; 3' ---CTA TAG--- 5'
EcoT14I		Escherichia coli TB14	5' CCWWGG; 3' GGWWCC	5' ---C CWWGG--- 3'; 3' ---GGWWC C--- 5'
EcoT22I		Escherichia coli TB22	5' ATGCAT; 3' TACGTA	5' ---ATGCA T--- 3'; 3' ---T ACGTA--- 5'	BfrBI, Csp68KIII, Mph1103I, NsiI, PinBI, Ppu10I, SepI, SspD5II
EcoT38I		Escherichia coli TH38	5' GRGCYC; 3' CYCGRG	5' ---GRGCY C--- 3'; 3' ---C YCGRG--- 5'
EcoVIII		Escherichia coli E1585-68	5' AAGCTT; 3' TTCGAA	5' ---A AGCTT--- 3'; 3' ---TTCGA A--- 5'
Eco13kI		Escherichia coli 13k	5' CCNGG; 3' GGNCC	5' --- CCNGG--- 3'; 3' ---GGNCC --- 5'
Eco21kI		Escherichia coli 21k	5' CCNGG; 3' GGNCC	5' --- CCNGG--- 3'; 3' ---GGNCC --- 5'
Eco27kI		Escherichia coli 27	5' CYCGRG; 3' GRGCYC	5' ---C YCGRG--- 3'; 3' ---GRGCY C--- 5'	Ama87I, AvaI, Bse15I, BsoBI, BstSI, NspIII, OfoI, PunAI
Eco29kI		Escherichia coli	5' CCGCGG; 3' GGCGCC	5' ---CCGC GG--- 3'; 3' ---GG CGCC--- 5'
Eco53kI		Escherichia coli 53k	5' GAGCTC; 3' CTCGAG	5' ---GAG CTC--- 3'; 3' ---CTC GAG--- 5'
Eco137kI		Escherichia coli 137k	5' CCNGG; 3' GGNCC	5' --- CCNGG--- 3'; 3' ---GGNCC --- 5'
EgeI		Enterobacter gergoviae NA	5' GGCGCC; 3' CCGCGG	5' ---GGC GCC--- 3'; 3' ---CCG CGG--- 5'
EheI		Erwinia herbicola 9/5	5' GGCGCC; 3' CCGCGG	5' ---GGC GCC--- 3'; 3' ---CCG CGG--- 5'
ErhI		Erwinia rhaponici B9	5' CCWWGG; 3' GGWWCC	5' ---C CWWGG--- 3'; 3' ---GGWWC C--- 5'
ErhB9I		Erwinia rhaponici B9	5' CGATCG; 3' GCTAGC	5' ---CGAT CG--- 3'; 3' ---GC TAGC--- 5'	Afa16RI, Afa22MI, EagBI, NblI, Ple19I, Psu161I, RshI, XorII
ErhB9II		Erwinia rhaponici B9	5' CCWWGG; 3' GGWWCC	5' ---C CWWGG--- 3'; 3' ---GGWWC C--- 5'
ErpI		Erwinia rhaponici	5' GGWCC; 3' CCWGG	5' ---G GWCC--- 3'; 3' ---CCWG G--- 5'	Bme18I, BthAI, Csp68KI, Eco47I, FssI, HgiEI, Kzo49I, SmuEI
EsaBC3I		Environmental sample BC3	5' TCGA; 3' AGCT	5' ---TC GA--- 3'; 3' ---AG CT--- 5'
EsaBC4I		Environmental sample BC4	5' GGCC; 3' CCGG	5' ---GG CC--- 3'; 3' ---CC GG--- 5'
EspI		Eucapsis sp.	5' GCTNAGC; 3' CGANTCG	5' ---GC TNAGC--- 3'; 3' ---CGANT CG--- 5'
Esp3I		Erwinia sp. RFL3	5' CGTCTC; 3' GCAGAG	5' ---CGTCTCN NNNN--- 3'; 3' ---GCAGAGNNNNN --- 5'
Esp4I		Erwinia sp. RFL4	5' CTTAAG; 3' GAATTC	5' ---C TTAAG--- 3'; 3' ---GAATT C--- 5'
Esp1396I		Enterobacter sp. RFL1396	5' CCAN_{5}TGG; 3' GGTN_{5}ACC	5' ---CCANNNN NTGG--- 3'; 3' ---GGTN NNNNACC--- 5'	AccB7I, AcpII, Asp10HII, BasI, PflBI, PflMI, Van91I

=== F ===
**Enzyme**	**PDB code**	Source	**Recognition sequence**	**Cut**	**Isoschizomers**
FalI		Flavobacterium aquatile Ob10	5' AAGN_{5}CTT; 3' TTCN_{5}GAA	5' ---AAGN_{5}CTTN_{7}NNNNNN --- 3'; 3' ---TTCN_{5}GAAN_{7}N NNNNN--- 5'
FalII		Flavobacterium aquatile Ob10	5' CGCG; 3' GCGC	5' ---CG CG--- 3'; 3' ---GC GC--- 5'	BepI, BspFNI, Bsp123I, BspFNI, BstUI, BtkI, FalII, **SelI**, ThaI
FaqI		Flavobacterium aquatile RFL1	5' GGGAC; 3' CCCTG	5' ---GGGACN_{8}NN NNNN--- 3'; 3' ---CCCTGN_{8}NNNNNN --- 5'
FatI		Flavobacterium aquatile NL3	5' CATG; 3' GTAC	5' --- CATG--- 3'; 3' ---GTAC --- 5'
FauI		Flavobacterium aquatile	5' CCCGC; 3' GGGCG	5' ---CCCGCNNNN NN--- 3'; 3' ---GGGCGNNNNNN --- 5'
FauBII		Flavobacterium aureus B	5' CGCG; 3' GCGC	5' ---CG CG--- 3'; 3' ---GC GC--- 5'	Bpu95I, BspFNI, Bsp123I, BspFNI, BstUI, BtkI, Csp68KVI, **SelI**, ThaI
FauNDI		Flavobacterium aquatile ND	5' CATATG; 3' GTATAC	5' ---CA TATG--- 3'; 3' ---GTAT AC--- 5'
FbaI		Flavobacterium balustinum	5' TGATCA; 3' ACTAGT	5' ---T GATCA--- 3'; 3' ---ACTAG T--- 5'	AbaI, BclI, BsiQI, BspXII, BstT7I, Ksp22I, / ParI
FblI		Flavobacterium balustinum	5' GTMKAC; 3' CAKMTG	5' ---GT MKAC--- 3'; 3' ---CAKM TG--- 5'	AccI, XmiI
FbrI		Flavobacterium breve	5' GCNGC; 3' CGNCG	5' ---GC NGC--- 3'; 3' ---CGN CG--- 5'
FdiI		Fremyella diplosiphon	5' GGWCC; 3' CCWGG	5' ---G GWCC--- 3'; 3' ---CCWG G--- 5'	Bme18I, BthAI, Csp68KI, ErpI, FssI, HgiEI, Kzo49I, SmuEI
FdiII		Fremyella diplosiphon	5' TGCGCA; 3' ACGCGT	5' ---TGC GCA--- 3'; 3' ---ACG CGT--- 5'	Acc16I, AosI, AviII, FspI, MstI, NsbI, PamI, Pun14627I
FgoI		Fervidobacterium gondwanense AB39T	5' CTAG; 3' GATC	5' ---C TAG--- 3'; 3' ---GAT C--- 5'
FmuI		Flavobacterium multivorum	5' GGNCC; 3' CCNGG	5' ---GGNC C--- 3'; 3' ---C CNGG--- 5'	FmuI **AvcI**, **BavAII**, **Bce22I**, **Bsu54I**, **NspIV**, **Pde12I**, **UnbI**
FnuAI		Fusobacterium nucleatum A	5' GANTC; 3' CTNAG	5' ---G ANTC--- 3'; 3' ---CTNA G--- 5'
FnuCI		Fusobacterium nucleatum C	5' GATC; 3' CTAG	5' --- GATC--- 3'; 3' ---CTAG --- 5'	Bme12I, Bsp67I, Bst19II, CcyI, FnuEI, MgoI, NphI, SauMI
FnuDI		Fusobacterium nucleatum D	5' GGCC; 3' CCGG	5' ---GG CC--- 3'; 3' ---CC GG--- 5'
FnuDII		Fusobacterium nucleatum D	5' CGCG; 3' GCGC	5' ---CG CG--- 3'; 3' ---GC GC--- 5'	Bpu95I, Bsh1236I, Bsp50I, BstFNI, BstUI, Csp68KVI, FnuDII, ThaI
FnuDIII		Fusobacterium nucleatum D	5' GCGC; 3' CGCG	5' ---GCG C--- 3'; 3' ---C GCG--- 5'	AspLEI, BspLAI, BstHHI, CfoI, HhaI, **Hin6I**, **HinP1I**, **HspAI**, **SciNI**
FnuEI		Fusobacterium nucleatum E	5' GATC; 3' CTAG	5' --- GATC--- 3'; 3' ---CTAG --- 5'	Bme12I, Bsp67I, Bst19II, CcyI, FnuCI, MgoI, NphI, Sau3AI
Fnu4HI		Fusobacterium nucleatum 4H	5' GCNGC; 3' CGNCG	5' ---GC NGC--- 3'; 3' ---CGN CG--- 5'
FokI	2FOK	Flavobacterium okeanokoites	5' GGATG; 3' CCTAC	5' ---GGATGN_{8}N NNNN--- 3'; 3' ---CCTACN_{8}NNNNN --- 5'
FriOI		Flavobacterium sp. O9	5' GRGCYC; 3' CYCGRG	5' ---GRGCY C--- 3'; 3' ---C YCGRG--- 5'
FseI		Frankia sp. Eu11b	5' GGCCGGCC; 3' CCGGCCGG	5' ---GGCCGG CC--- 3'; 3' ---CC GGCCGG--- 5'
FsiI		Frankia sp.	5' RAATTY; 3' YTTAAR	5' ---R AATTY--- 3'; 3' ---YTTAA R--- 5'	AcsI, ApoI, / CfaI, / XapI
FspI		Fischerella sp.	5' TGCGCA; 3' ACGCGT	5' ---TGC GCA--- 3'; 3' ---ACG CGT--- 5'	Acc16I, AosI, AviII, FdiII, MstI, NsbI, PamI, Pun14627I
FspII		Fischerella sp.	5' TTCGAA; 3' AAGCTT	5' ---TT CGAA--- 3'; 3' ---AAGC TT--- 5'	Asp10HI, Bim19I, BsiCI, BstBI, Csp45I, LspI, PlaII, Ssp1I, SviI
Fsp1604I		Flavobacterium sp. I 16-04	5' CCWGG; 3' GGWCC	5' ---CC WGG--- 3'; 3' ---GGW CC--- 5'	ApaORI, BseBI, BshGI, BstNI, BstOI, Bst2UI, BthEI, **EcoRII**, **SleI**
FspAI		Flexibacter sp. TV-m21K	5' RTGCGCAY; 3' YACGCGTR	5' ---RTGC GCAY--- 3'; 3' ---YACG CGTR--- 5'
FspBI		Flavobacterium sp. RFLI	5' CTAG; 3' GATC	5' ---C TAG--- 3'; 3' ---GAT C--- 5'
Fsp4HI		Flavobacterium sp. 4H	5' GCNGC; 3' CGNCG	5' ---GC NGC--- 3'; 3' ---CGN CG--- 5'
FspMSI		Fischerella sp.	5' GGWCC; 3' CCWGG	5' ---G GWCC--- 3'; 3' ---CCWG G--- 5'	Bme18I, BthAI, DsaIV, ErpI, HgiBI, HgiEI, Kzo49I, SmuEI
FssI		Fibrobacter succinogenes S85	5' GGWCC; 3' CCWGG	5' ---G GWCC--- 3'; 3' ---CCWG G--- 5'	Bme18I, BthAI, DsaIV, ErpI, FspMSI, HgiEI, Kzo49I, **VpaK11AI**
FunI		Fischerella uniformis	5' AGCGCT; 3' TCGCGA	5' ---AGC GCT--- 3'; 3' ---TCG CGA--- 5'	AfeI, AitI, Aor51H, Eco47III
FunII		Fischerella uniformis	5' GAATTC; 3' CTTAAG	5' ---G AATTC--- 3'; 3' ---CTTAA G--- 5'
