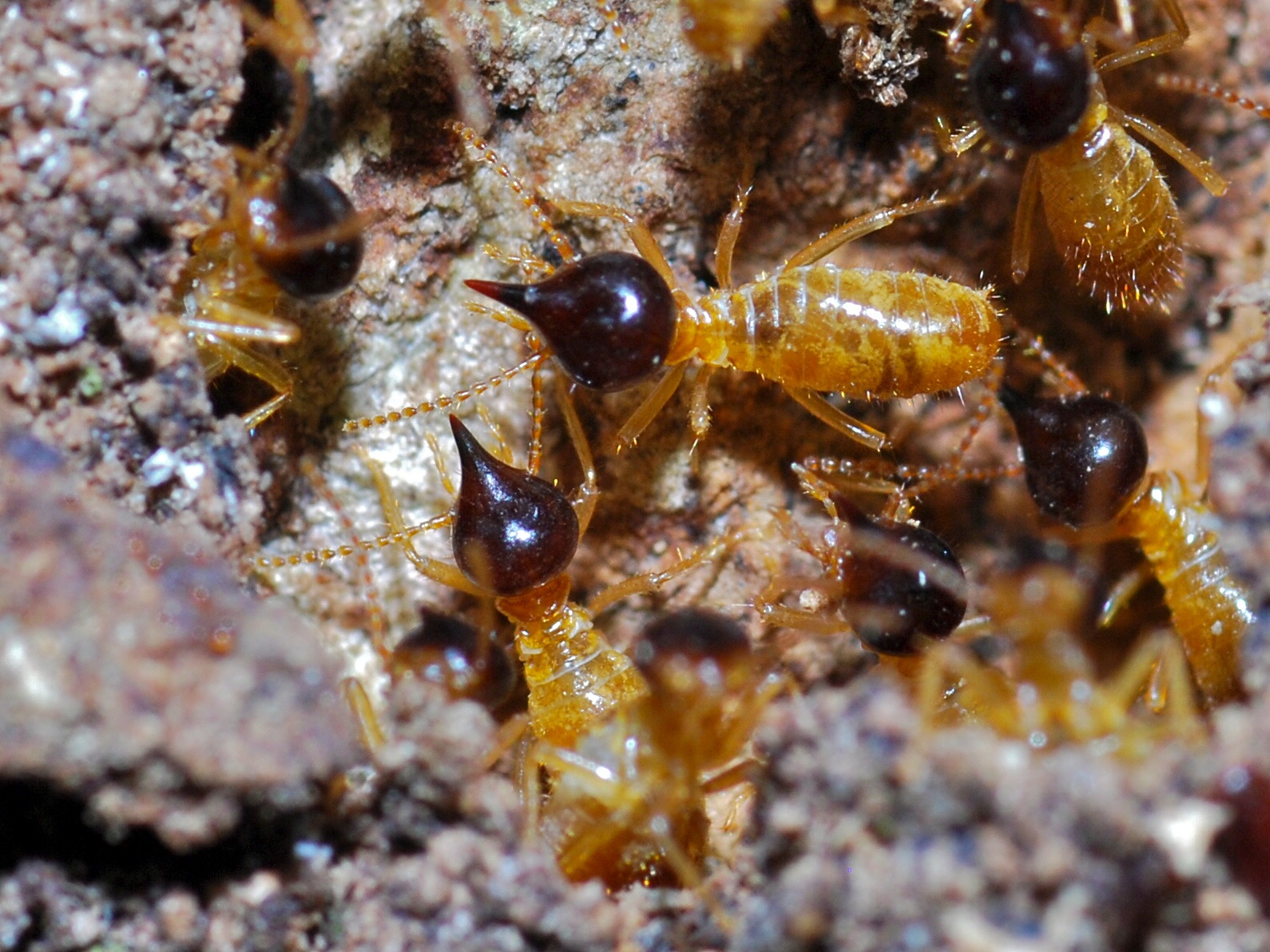

Scientific classification
- Kingdom: Animalia
- Phylum: Arthropoda
- Clade: Pancrustacea
- Class: Insecta
- Order: Blattodea
- Infraorder: Isoptera
- Family: Termitidae
- Genus: Nasutitermes
- Species: N. corniger

Binomial name
- Nasutitermes corniger (Motschulsky, 1855)

= Nasutitermes corniger =

Species of termite

Nasutitermes corniger is a species of arboreal termite that is endemic to the neotropics. It is very closely related to Nasutitermes ephratae. The species has been studied relatively intensively, particularly on Barro Colorado Island, Panama. These studies and others have shown that the termite interacts with many different organisms including a bat that roosts in its nest and various species of ants that cohabit with the termite.

== Description ==
The nests of N. corniger are dark brown on the surface and have small bumps over their exterior. When small (less than 20 cm in diameter) they tend to be spherical but as they grow they become more elliptical. There may also be localised lobes on the surface of the nest. The queen lives in a chamber located in the centre of the nest, (often near the tree trunk or branch to which the nest is attached), that is up to 8 cm wide and 1 cm high and heavily reinforced. The thickness of the walls in the nest decreases away from the queen and towards the exterior although if the nest is attacked by predators then the walls will be reinforced. In one study of their nests the heaviest nest identified weighed 28 kilograms and measured 68 cm by 46 cm by 34 cm.

Fertile individuals of N. corniger have black wings, dark bodies, and ocelli which are located relatively far from the eyes.

== Social behavior ==
Termite colonies are examples of eusocial insects. Eusocial insects are animals that develop large, multigenerational cooperative societies that assist each other in the rearing of young, often at the cost of an individual's life or reproductive ability. Such altruism is explained in that eusocial insects benefit from giving up reproductive ability of many individuals to improve the overall fitness of closely related offspring. Hamilton's rule is the key to explaining this phenomenon, where altruism is justified evolutionarily when the benefit to the individual receiving the help, weighted by the relatedness to said individual, outweighs the cost to the organism being altruistic. In most cases, termites included, individuals specialize to fill different needs that the overall colony may have. These are called castes. In Nasutitermes as well as most other termite species, there are three main castes: reproductive alates, workers, and soldiers.

=== Fortress defense ===
The benefits to being altruistic come in two ecological modes: “life insurers” and “fortress defenders”. Most Hymenoptera, the large majority of social insects, are life insurers, where eusociality is adapted as a safeguard from decreased life expectancy of offspring. Termites, as fortress defenders, benefit from working together to best exploit a valuable ecological resource, in the case of Nasutitermes corniger a vast wood gallery. Fortress defense is sufficient to evolve eusociality when three criteria are met: food coinciding with shelter, selection for defense against intruders and predators, and the ability to defend such a habitat. Termite colonies are generally large enclosed nests or mounds that house large supplies of wood for the termites to exploit, fulfilling the first criteria for fortress defense. In N. corniger, the soldier caste has had their heads modified to spew a noxious, sticky liquid when under attack from Tamandua anteaters. The secretion contains pinene, limonene and other compounds that deter the anteater from returning. The termites then remain on guard near the breach for several minutes. This adaptive morphology and defense of the habitat are sufficient for satisfying the second two criteria for fortress defense. The fortress defense strategy necessitated the evolution of soldiers first, which has resulted in the unique specialization of the nasute termites.

== Recognition ==
Nasutitermes corniger exhibits a large amount of aggression to rival conspecific colonies. This implies that there is a method of kin recognition among N. corniger that allow it to distinguish between its colony and the next. While specific studies have not been done in N. corniger, similar species in Microcerotermes and many other termites show that they are able to detect scent on each other. It has been shown that some separate colonies display relatively low aggression to each other and oftentimes result in colony fusion. It is of note that these colonies will show massive aggression towards other colonies, indicating it is not a loss in aggressive behavior but a failure in recognition. It has been shown that colonies that exhibit this nonaggressive behavior have a relatively low average within-colony relatedness of .35, whereas colonies that retained mutually aggressive behavior had a higher relatedness average of .55. The nonaggressive colonies often had polygamous reproductive individuals, and may have a broader template of acceptable odor clues, leading to recognition of other colonies.

== Reproduction ==
The number of fertile individuals produced by colonies of N. corniger varies widely. Mature colonies with between 50,000 and 400,000 infertile workers generally produce between 5,000 and 25,000 alates. In some years, large colonies do not produce a fertile brood. Alate nymphs develop through five instars and spend between 5 and 8 months within the colony before leaving to mate. When the alates are mature they typically account for 35% of the colony's biomass. More males than females are produced from each colony but because females are heavier (by between 20 and 40%) the energy investment in each sex is similar. Newly formed colonies tend to have multiple queens and kings all living in the same royal chamber. Slightly older colonies tend to consist of multiple queens (up to 33) but only one king, in these cases the species can be considered polygynous. Over several years the species turns to being monogamous, having only one queen and one king. Being polygynous in the early stages of the colony is advantageous as it allows the colony to produce many workers in a short period of time and allows the production of female alates more quickly than if they were monogamous from the start.

== Range ==
N. corniger have been found in Mexico, Guatemala, Honduras, Costa Rica, Panama, Venezuela, Trinidad, Tobago, Bolivia, Puerto Rico and more recently in Florida.

== Interactions ==
=== Associations ===
Numerous species of ants cohabit the nests of N. corniger or colonise them once the termites have abandoned them. Some species prey on the termites but others do not. Studies with radioactive tracers have shown that when cohabiting nutrients flow both ways between the ants and the termites. Monacis bispinosa, also known as Dolichoderus bispinosus, is one of the most common ant species to cohabit with the termites but is susceptible to their chemical defences and cannot prey on live termites. Camponotus abdominalis associates with termites less often but is an aggressive predator of the termites. Camponotus species and Dolichoderus diversus have been found to inhabit N. corniger nests that have been abandoned.

Crematogaster brevispinosa rochai is one subspecies of ant whose interaction with N. corniger has been studied. C. b. rochai lives in areas of caatinga in Brazil. No queens of the ant have been found in the nests but their larvae of all castes and sexes have been. Nests that contain C. b. rochai do not have a termite queen in either. It can therefore be concluded that both the ants and termites are members of polydomous colonies that each have numerous nest sites. The ants and termites are segregated within the nest and do not normally come into contact with each other. C. b. rochai plug channels at the boundary of the areas they occupy to cause this segregation. On occasions when the ants and termites do come into contact with each other (e.g. if the nest is broken into) they are rarely aggressive and tend to avoid each other instead. It has been hypothesised that the hydrocarbon content of their cuticles may have changed to allow them to live together relatively peacefully.

The termites are thought to benefit from the association as the ants leave debris in the nest containing nitrogen and that this increases the availability of this important nutrient in an environment where it is scarce. They may also benefit from the ants protecting the nest from predators. The ants benefit as the termite nests provide an ideal location to raise broods, particularly of reproductive castes. The climate is suitable for this and the nests are easily defended against predators. Other Nasutitermes species have been found to produce anti-fungal compounds and these would also be beneficial to the ants although it is not known if N. corniger do produce such compounds.

The White-throated Round-eared Bat, Lophostoma silvicola, roosts inside the nests of N.corniger. Males excavate the roost themselves, expending considerable energy whilst doing so. They consequently gain reproductive success as a harem of females will join them in the roost. The termite nest is an ideal temperature for raising young and provides protection from predators of the bats. N. corniger repair the damage made to the nest by the bat meaning that the males have to constantly maintain the roost. Once the bats leave the cavity is filled by the termites within a few weeks. Scientists are currently investigating how the bats are able to create the roosts without being attacked by the termites.

Several bird species including trogons, puffbirds and parakeets also form nests in termite nests. These can be distinguished from those made by bats as they have a horizontal entrance whereas those made by bats have a vertical entrance at the base of the nest.

=== Symbioses ===
The entire gut flora of a termite very closely related to N. corniger has been analysed using metagenomics to determine the function of different microbes in their gut. Typical to all wood-feeding higher termites, bacterial gut microbiota in the guts of N. corniger are dominated by insect-specific members of TG3 (candidate_phylum), Fibrobacterota, and Spirochaetota. It has also been shown that the same bacterial lineages are preferentially enriched in the cellulolytic bacterial community that is associated with wood particles in the gut. In addition to a role in fiber digestion, Symbiotic bacteria in N. corniger have also been shown to fix nitrogen at a rate of 0.25-1.0 mg N per colony per hour. This suggests a nitrogen doubling time of 200–500 days making it possible for the whole population of the colony to be replaced once or twice each year.
