= Polyneuridine-aldehyde esterase =

polyneuridine-aldehyde esterase
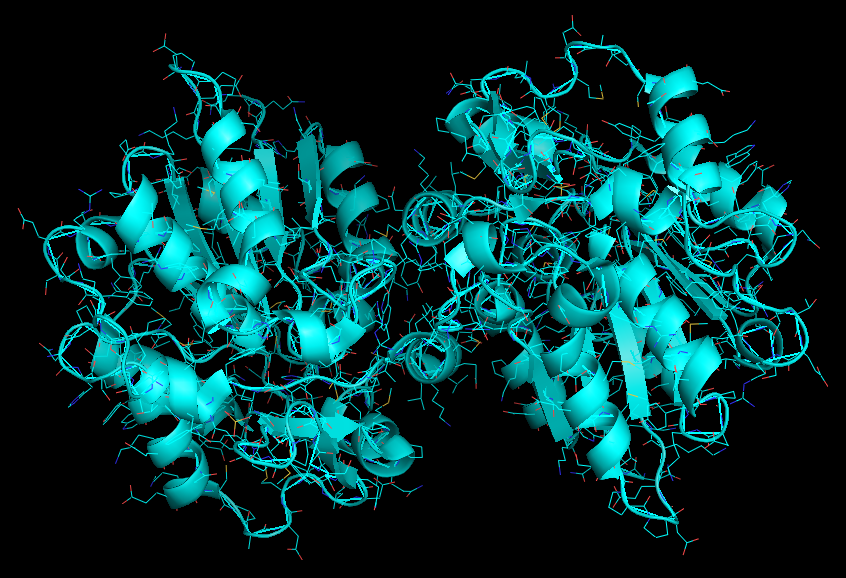
- Polyneuridine-Aldehyde Esterase 3D Rendering

Identifiers
- EC no.: 3.1.1.78
- CAS no.: 87041-55-2

Databases
- IntEnz: IntEnz view
- BRENDA: BRENDA entry
- ExPASy: NiceZyme view
- KEGG: KEGG entry
- MetaCyc: metabolic pathway
- PRIAM: profile
- PDB structures: RCSB PDB PDBe PDBsum
- Gene Ontology: AmiGO / QuickGO
Search
- PMC: articles
- PubMed: articles
- NCBI: proteins

The enzyme polyneuridine-aldehyde esterase (EC 3.1.1.78) catalyzes the following reaction:

polyneuridine aldehyde + H_{2}O $\rightleftharpoons$ 16-epivellosimine + CO_{2} + methanol

This enzyme participates in indole alkaloid biosynthesis.

== Nomenclature ==
This enzyme belongs to the family of hydrolases, specifically those acting on carboxylic ester bonds. The systematic name is polyneuridine aldehyde hydrolase (decarboxylating). Other names in common use include:

- polyneuridine aldehyde esterase
- PNAE

== Homologues ==
This enzyme is found in various forms in plant species such as Arabidopsis thaliana, Glycine max (soybean), Vitis vinifera (wine grape), and Solanum lycopersicum (tomato) among others.

Polyneuridine-aldehyde esterase also appears in select bacteria including Enterobacter cloacae.

== Structure ==
The secondary structure of this enzyme consists mainly of α helices. In its native form, this enzyme has a tertiary structure that includes two main lobes (as depicted above in the blue 3D representation on the top right).

== Reaction ==
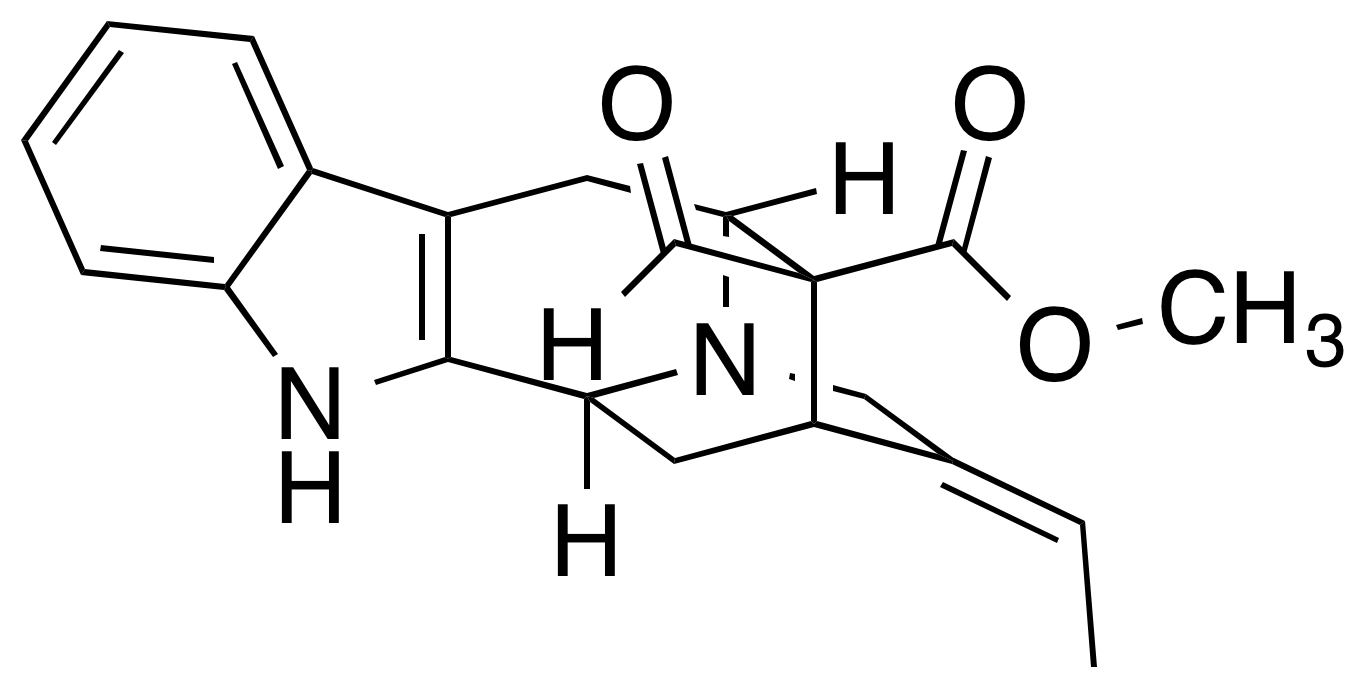
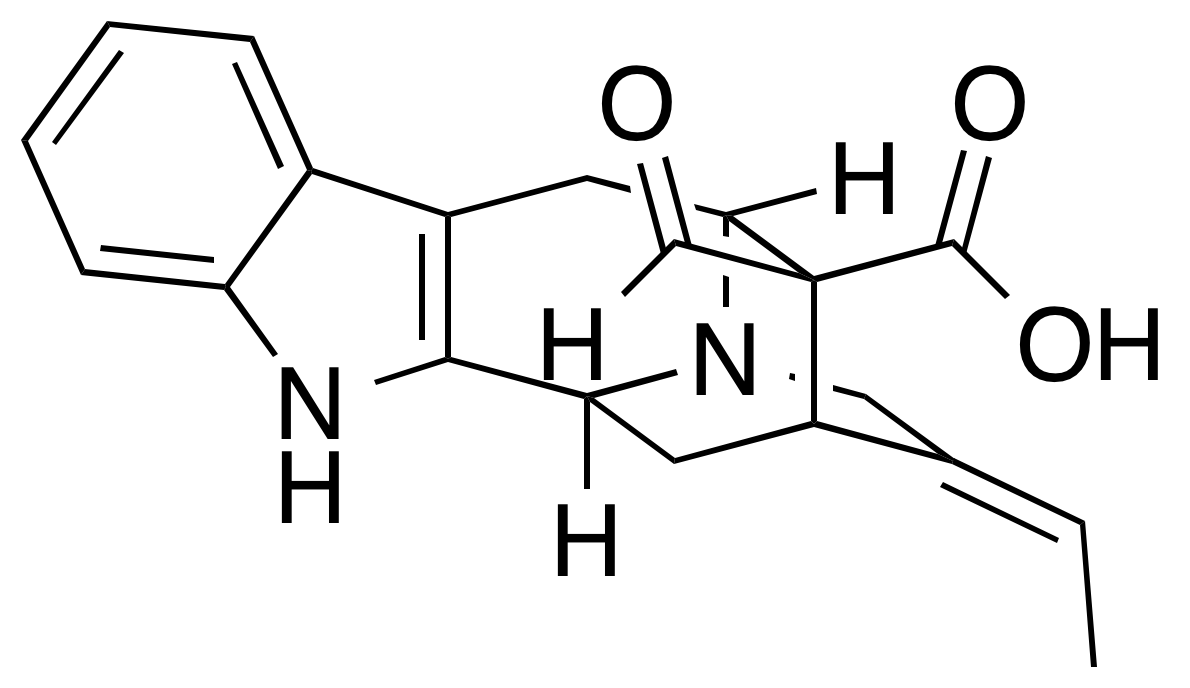
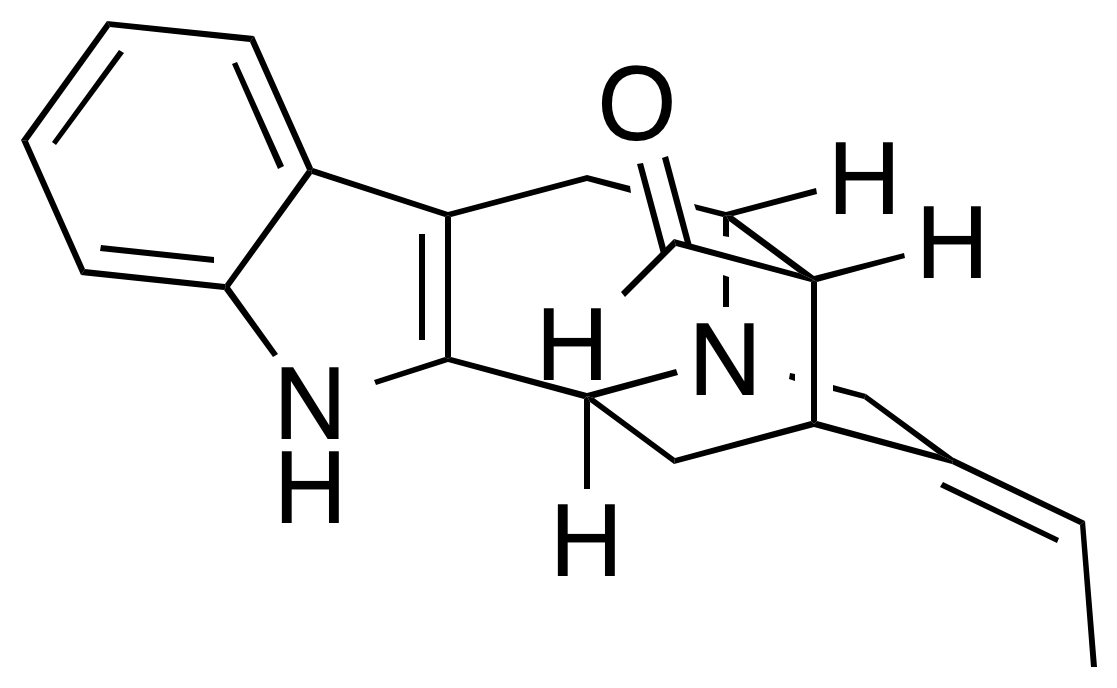
$\xrightarrow[+ H_2O\ -CH_3OH]{polyneuridine-aldehyde\ esterase}$	$\xrightarrow[- CO_2]{}$

Polyneuridine-aldehyde esterase catalyzes the hydrolysis of the methyl ester in polyneuridine aldehyde to form polyneuridine β-aldehydoacid and methanol. The carboxylic acid in the product spontaneously undergoes decarboxylation, yielding 16-epivellosimine and carbon dioxide.

== Mechanism ==
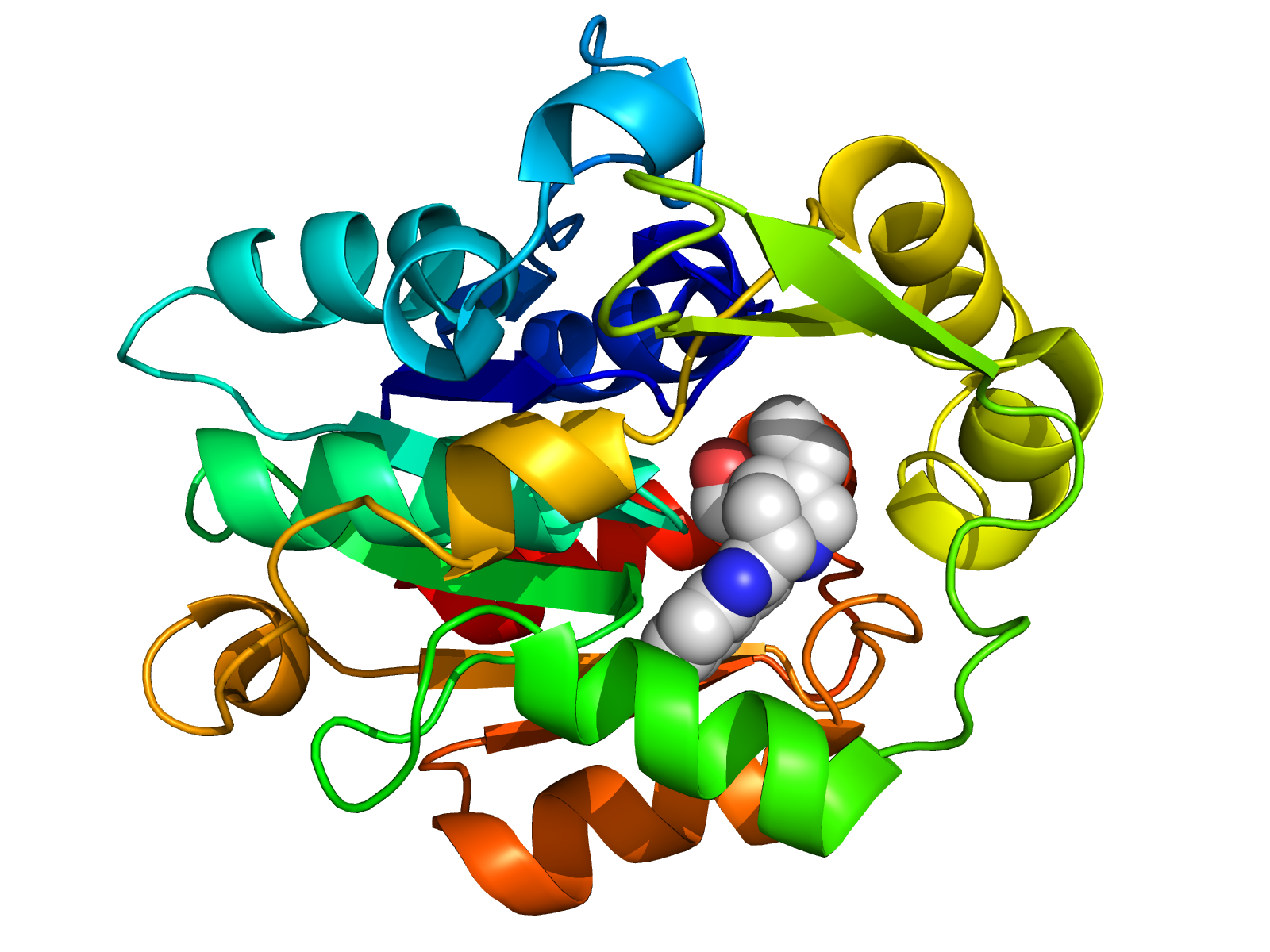
Crystallographic structure of polyneuridine aldehyde esterase from Rauvolfia serpentina (rainbow colored, N-terminus = blue, C-terminus = red). The enzyme is complexed with its product 16-epi-vellosimine that is depicted as a space-filling model (carbon = white, oxygen = red, nitrogen = blue).

The mechanism of hydrolysis performed by polyneuridine-aldehyde esterase is not known. It has been suggested that the enzyme utilizes a catalytic triad composed of Ser-87, Asp-216 and His-244. The catalytic amino acid order is the same as the order of enzymes that are part of the α/β hydrolase family. Thus polyneuridine-aldehyde esterase may be a novel member of the α/β hydrolase group.

== Broader significance ==
This enzyme is a part of the pathway of indole alkaloid biosynthesis. The indole alkaloids that result from this metabolic pathway are used by many plant species as a defense against herbivores and parasites.

== Open questions ==
The precise mechanisms by which this enzyme performs its function is still unknown. As noted above, researchers are formulating suggestions as to how polyneuridine-aldehyde esterase catalyses the decomposition of polyneuridine-aldehyde, but a mechanism has not yet been affirmed with absolute certainty. Due to the lack of complete understanding of polyneuridine-aldehyde esterase's precise mechanism, this enzyme cannot be grouped into a family of enzymes. Based on mechanism theories, suggestions can be made as to how this enzyme should be categorized, and some parallels can be drawn between polyneuridine-aldehyde esterase and other enzymes.
