= FtsZ-DE RNA motif =

ftsZ-DE
- Consensus secondary structure and sequence conservation of ftsZ-DE RNA

Identifiers
- Symbol: ftsZ-DE
- Rfam: RF02985

Other data
- RNA type: Gene; sRNA
- SO: SO:0001263
- PDB structures: PDBe

The ftsZ-DE RNA motif is a conserved RNA structure that was discovered by bioinformatics. ftsZ-DE motifs are found in bacteria belonging to the genus Fibrobacter.

It is ambiguous whether ftsZ-DE RNAs function as cis-regulatory elements or whether they operate in trans as small RNAs. ftsZ-DE RNAs are consistently located immediately downstream of predicted operons, one of whose genes is predicted as ftsZ. ftsZ genes encode a GTPase that is involved in cell division. This genomic arrangement could suggest that ftsZ-DE RNAs function as cis-regulatory elements as part of the 3' untranslated regions of these operons. However, these locations rarely contain cis-regulatory RNAs in bacteria. Another possibility that was proposed is that ftsZ-DE RNAs represent an unusual form of Rho-independent transcription terminators that are specific to the under-studied phylum Fibrobacterota, to which Fibrobacter belongs. However, the ftsZ-DE motif exhibits some features that are not found in many Rho-independent terminators, especially that it consists of two hairpins. The function of ftsZ-DE RNAs has not, as of 2018, been established.
