= Poribacteria-1 RNA motif =

Poribacteria-1
- Consensus secondary structure and sequence conservation of Poribacteria-1 RNA

Identifiers
- Symbol: Poribacteria-1
- Rfam: RF03113

Other data
- RNA type: Gene; sRNA
- SO: SO:0001263
- PDB structures: PDBe

The Poribacteria-1 RNA motif is a conserved RNA structure that was discovered by bioinformatics. The Poribacteria-1 motif is found only in the candidate bacterial phylum known as Poribacteria, and all 6 Poribacteria-1 RNAs are actually found in one organism, Candidatus Poribacteria sp. WGA-4E. All but one of these RNAs occur within roughly 6 kilobases of genomic DNA, and each of the 5 RNAs occurs between a different pair of protein-coding genes. This arrangement could suggest that the motif functions on the level of single-stranded DNA as attC sites that are part of an integron. It is also possible that Poribacteria-1 RNAs are cis-regulatory elements that regulate genes that happen to often be nearby to one another, or that the RNAs function in trans as small RNAs.
