= TG3 (disambiguation) =

TG3 is an Italian news programme.

TG3 may also refer to:

- Schweizer TG-3 military glider
- Candidate phylum TG3, a candidate bacterial phylum that is closely related to the phylum Fibrobacteres
