= Cow-rumen RNA motif =

Conserved RNA structures

cow-rumen-3
- Consensus secondary structure and sequence conservation of cow-rumen-3 RNA

Identifiers
- Symbol: cow-rumen-3
- Rfam: RF03083

Other data
- RNA type: Gene; sRNA
- SO: SO:0001263
- PDB structures: PDBe

Cow-rumen RNA motifs refer to conserved RNA structures discovered by bioinformatics that are found exclusively in metagenomics DNA samples isolated from cow rumen. Thus, the organisms containing these RNAs have not yet been determined. Organisms that are common in rumen have been studied.

The cow-rumen-1 to -4 motifs likely function in trans as sRNAs.
