= Western round-eared bat =

Conservation status
- Near Threatened (IUCN 3.1)

Scientific classification
- Kingdom: Animalia
- Phylum: Chordata
- Class: Mammalia
- Order: Chiroptera
- Family: Phyllostomidae
- Genus: Lophostoma
- Species: L. occidentale

Binomial name
- Lophostoma occidentale Davis & Carter, 1978

Synonyms
- Tonatia silvicola occidentalis Davis & Carter, 1978; Lophostoma silvicolum occidentalis Davis & Carter, 1978; Lophostoma aequatorialis Baker, Fonseca, Parish, Phillips & Hoffmann, 2004

Species of bat

The western round-eared bat (Lophostoma occidentale) is a bat species found only on the Pacific coast of northwestern Ecuador.

== Taxonomy and etymology ==
It was described as a new subspecies of the white-throated round-eared bat in 1978 by Davis and Carter. As the white-throated round-eared bat was in the genus Tonatia at the time, the western round-eared bat had a trinomen of Tonatia silvicola occidentalis. In 2011, it was recognized as a full species. In the same publication, it was established that Lophostoma aequatorialis was a junior synonym of L. occidentale. Its species name "occidentalis" is Latin for "western."

== Description ==
Its forearm length is 51.2–56.8 mm (2.02–2.24 in). Its dorsal fur is long and dark brown, while the fur around its throat is whitish. It has white or pale gray patches of fur behind its ears.

== Range and status ==
It is found in South America, where its range includes Colombia, Ecuador, and Peru. It has been documented at elevations of 300–979 m (984–3,212 ft).

As of 2016, it was evaluated as a near-threatened species by the IUCN. Its population has likely declined by 20-25% in the last three generations due to habitat destruction.
