= Kalko's round-eared bat =

Conservation status
- Data Deficient (IUCN 3.1)

Scientific classification
- Kingdom: Animalia
- Phylum: Chordata
- Class: Mammalia
- Order: Chiroptera
- Family: Phyllostomidae
- Genus: Lophostoma
- Species: L. kalkoae

Binomial name
- Lophostoma kalkoae Velazco & Gardner, 2012
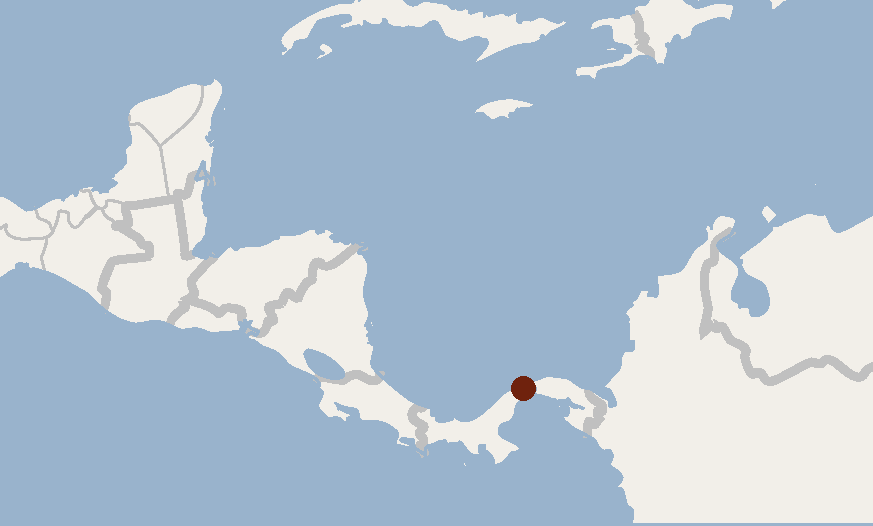
- Range map

Species of bat

Kalko's round-eared bat (Lophostoma kalkoae) is a species of leaf-nosed bat endemic to Panama.

== Taxonomy and etymology ==
It was described as a new species in 2012 by Paúl Velazco and Alfred Gardner. The holotype was collected in Soberanía National Park in Panama in October 1998. The specific epithet "kalkoae" is in honor of Elisabeth K. V. Kalko. Kalko had collected the holotype and the paratype for this species; Velazco and Gardner stated that she has "contributed in significant ways to the understanding of bat behavior and ecology worldwide."

== Description ==
It is a medium-sized member of its genus, with a forearm length of 44.6–45.8 mm (1.76–1.80 in). The fur on its back is long and dark brown, while the fur on its ventral side is white on the chest and pale brown on its sides.

== Biology and ecology ==
Little is known about the biology of this species. A small colony of 12 individuals was documented inside a hollowed-out Azteca ant nest situated on a tree so that the nest was 12 m (39 ft) off the ground. A pregnant female was once documented in October.

== Range and habitat ==
As of 2016, the species has not been documented outside of the type locality in Panama, Soberanía National Park.

== Conservation ==
As of 2016, it is evaluated as a data deficient species by the IUCN. It meets the criteria for this classification because, as a recently described species, its ecology and natural history are not yet well-known.
