= Lophostoma nicaraguae =

Mesoamerican round-eared bat

Scientific classification
- Kingdom: Animalia
- Phylum: Chordata
- Class: Mammalia
- Infraclass: Placentalia
- Order: Chiroptera
- Family: Phyllostomidae
- Genus: Lophostoma
- Species: L. nicaraguae

Binomial name
- Lophostoma nicaraguae Goodwin, 1942

Species of bat

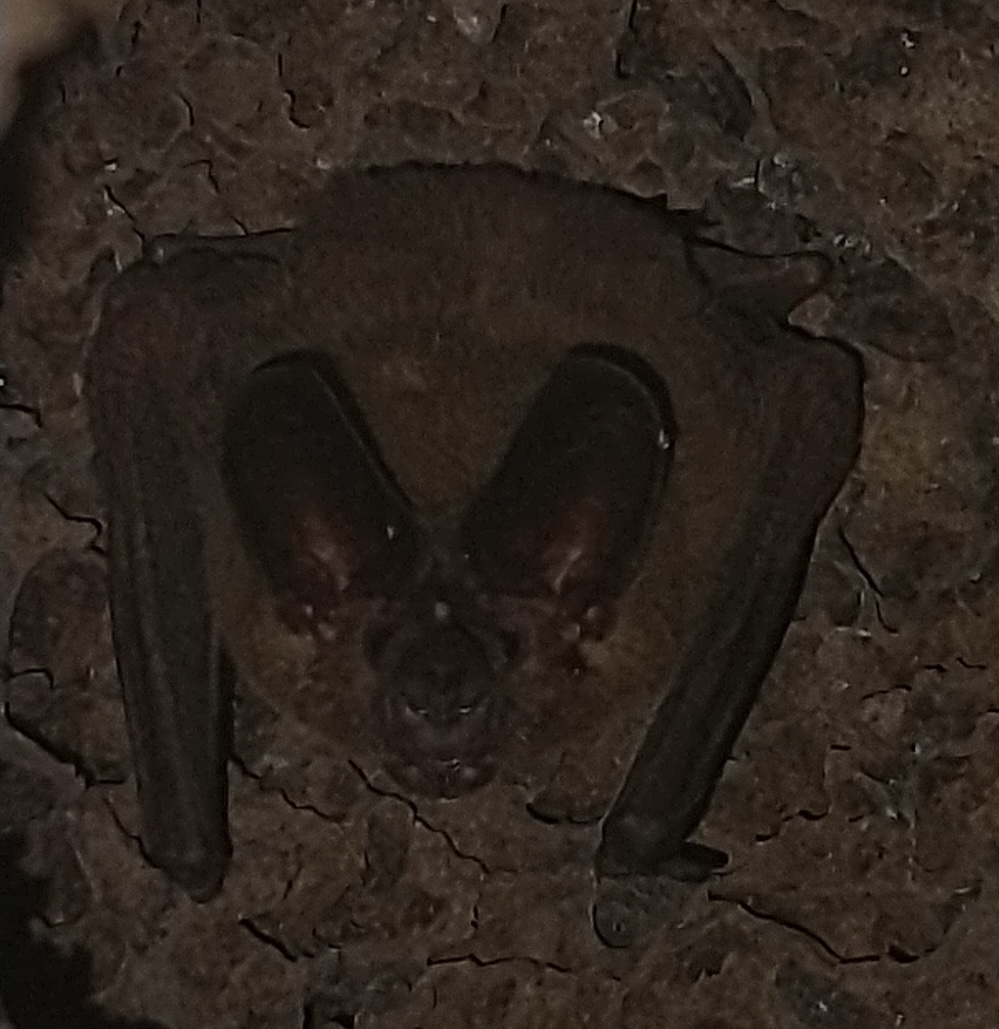

The Mesoamerican round-eared bat (Lophostoma nicaraguae) is a bat species from Central and South America.

== Description ==
It is a small bat and can be distinguished from all other species in its genus by its smaller size (FA < 37 mm) and shorter skull (GLS < 21 mm). Its dorsal fur is tricoloured and mummy brown, and ventral fur is bicoloured and clearer with a pale brown colouration. Its lower lip is naked and broken into a ‘V’ shape with wart-like protuberances.

== Range and habitat ==
It is found in several countries in both Central and South America, the northernmost extent of its range is in the Mexican states of Oaxaca, Chiapas, Campeche, and Quintana Roo, with further occurrences in Belize, Guatemala, Honduras, Nicaragua, Costa Rica, Panama, Colombia, and Ecuador. The southernmost limit of its range includes the northern and central part of Colombia, and the western slope of the Andes in Colombia and Ecuador.

It inhabits a wide variety of lowland ecosystems, including tropical rainforest, gallery forest, thorn forest, areas with secondary lowland ecosystems, and areas with strong human intervention such as coffee crop and banana groves. It occurs from sea level to 1300 m.
