= Chitinivibrio =

Scientific classification
- Domain: Bacteria
- Kingdom: Pseudomonadati
- Phylum: Fibrobacterota
- Class: Chitinivibrionia; Sorokin et al. 2014
- Order: Chitinivibrionales; Sorokin et al. 2014
- Family: Chitinivibrionaceae; Sorokin et al. 2014
- Genus: Chitinivibrio; Sorokin et al. 2014
- Species: C. alkaliphilus

Binomial name
- Chitinivibrio alkaliphilus Sorokin et al. 2014

Genus of bacteria

Chitinivibrio is an extremely haloalkaliphilic genus of bacteria with one known species, Chitinivibrio alkaliphilus. It is the only member of the family Chitinivibrionaceae, the order Chitinivibrionales and class Chitinivibrionia. Chitinivibrio alkaliphilus has been isolated from hypersaline lake sediments from Wadi al Natrun in Egypt.
