= Candidate phylum =

Lineage of organisms

A candidate division, candidate phylum or candidate division-level is a lineage of prokaryotic organisms for which until recently no cultured representatives have been found, but evidence of the existence of the clade has been obtained by 16S rRNA and metagenomic analysis of environmental samples. The term Candidatus in fact means a taxon for which there is insufficient information to call it a new species according to the International Code of Nomenclature of Bacteria.

== Examples of Candidate division bacteria ==
- Candidate division TM7 (Saccharibacteria)
- Poribacteria
- TG3 (candidate phylum) (Chitinivibrionia)

== See also ==
- Metagenomics
- Cloning
- DNA sequencing
