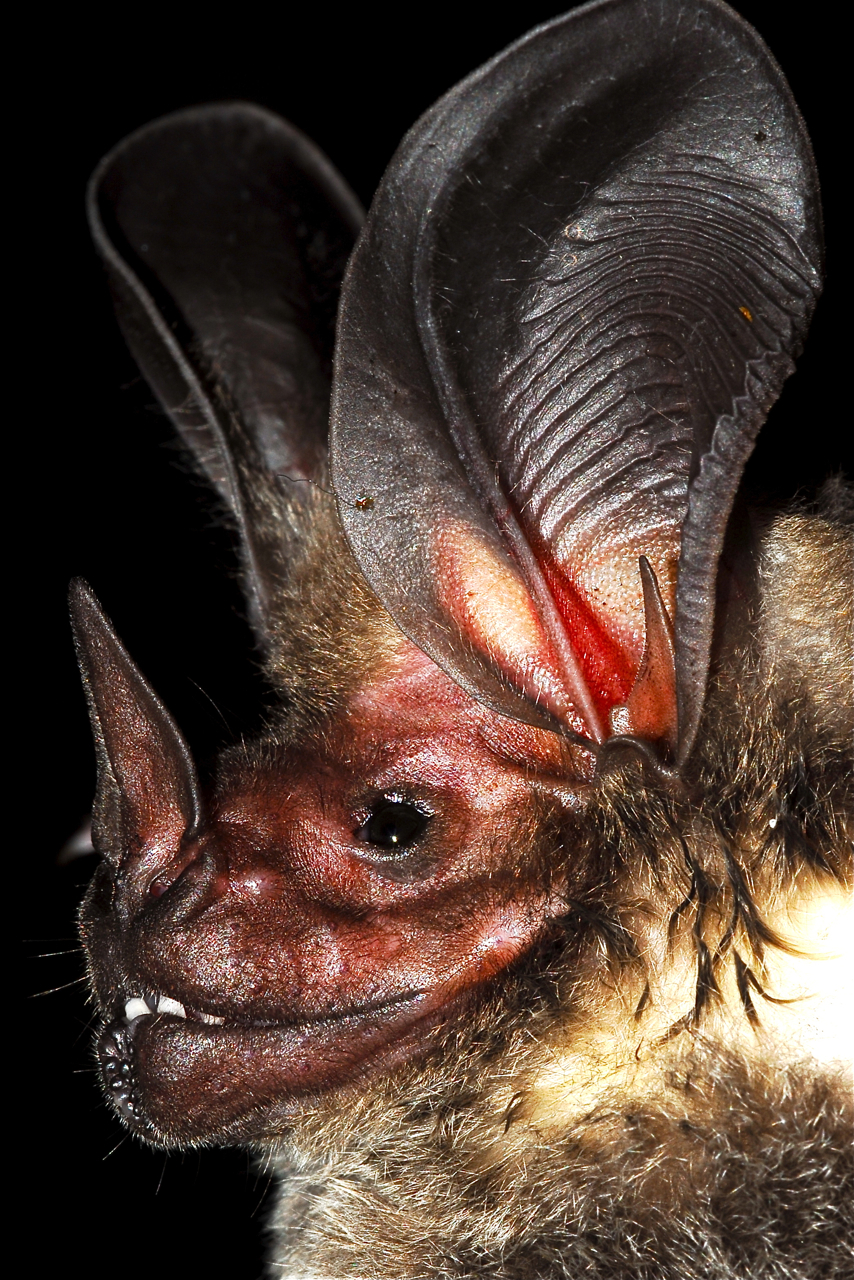
- White-throated round-eared bat (Lophostoma silvicola)

Scientific classification
- Kingdom: Animalia
- Phylum: Chordata
- Class: Mammalia
- Order: Chiroptera
- Family: Phyllostomidae
- Subfamily: Phyllostominae
- Genus: Lophostoma d'Orbigny, 1836

Type species
- Lophostoma silvicola d'Orbigny, 1836

Species
- Lophostoma brasiliense Lophostoma carrikeri Lophostoma evotis Lophostoma kalkoae Lophostoma occidentale Lophostoma schulzi Lophostoma silvicola

= Lophostoma =

Genus of bats

Lophostoma is a genus of Central and South American bats in the family Phyllostomidae.

== Species ==
Genus Lophostoma

- Pygmy round-eared bat, Lophostoma brasiliense
- Carriker's round-eared bat, Lophostoma carrikeri
- Davis's round-eared bat, Lophostoma evotis
- Kalko's round-eared bat, Lophostoma kalkoae
- Western round-eared bat, Lophostoma occidentalis
- Schultz's round-eared bat, Lophostoma schulzi
- White-throated round-eared bat, Lophostoma silvicola
- Mesoamerican round-eared bat, Lophostoma nicaraguae
