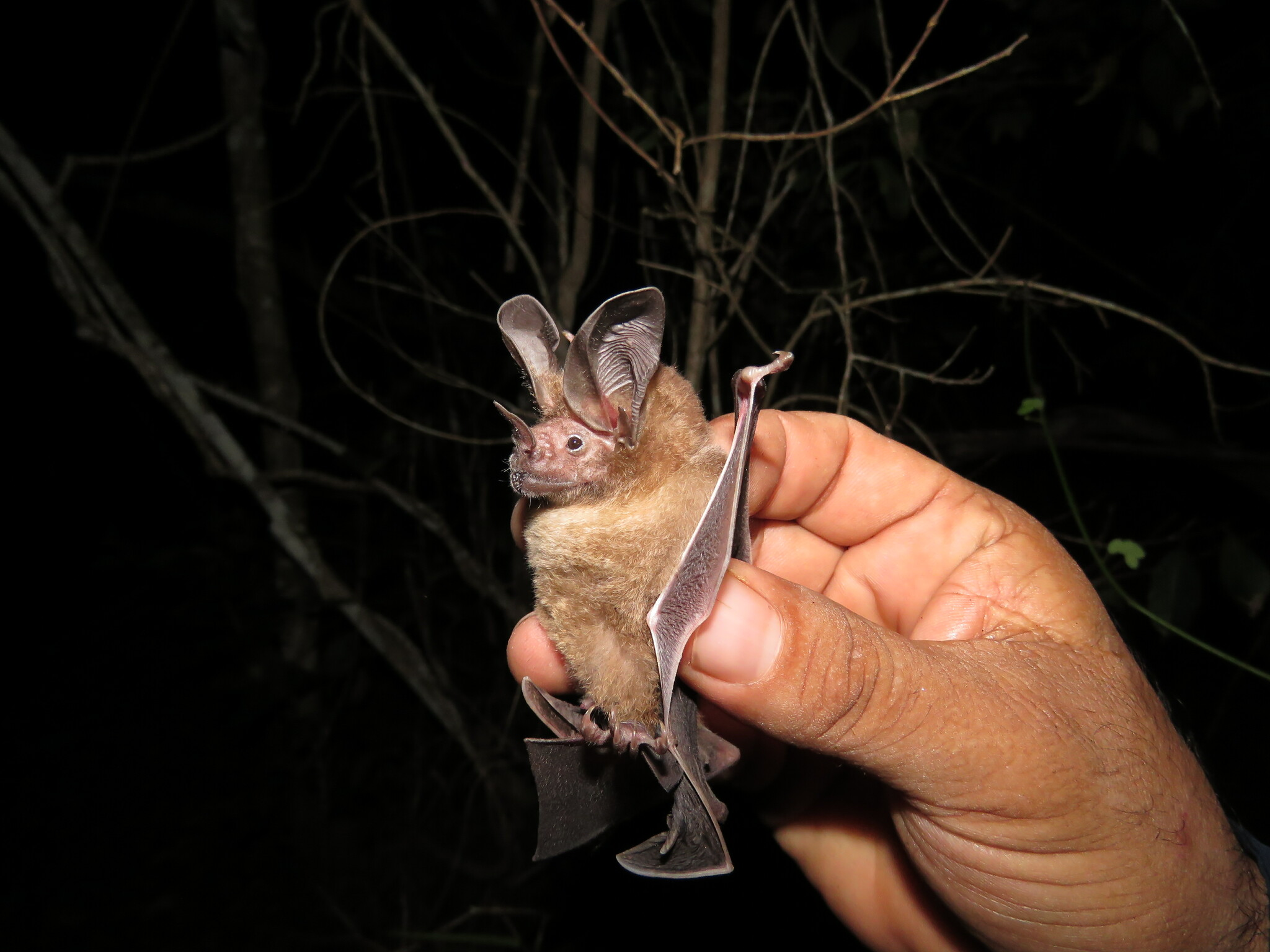

Conservation status
- Least Concern (IUCN 3.1)

Scientific classification
- Kingdom: Animalia
- Phylum: Chordata
- Class: Mammalia
- Order: Chiroptera
- Family: Phyllostomidae
- Genus: Lophostoma
- Species: L. evotis

Binomial name
- Lophostoma evotis Davis & Carter, 1978
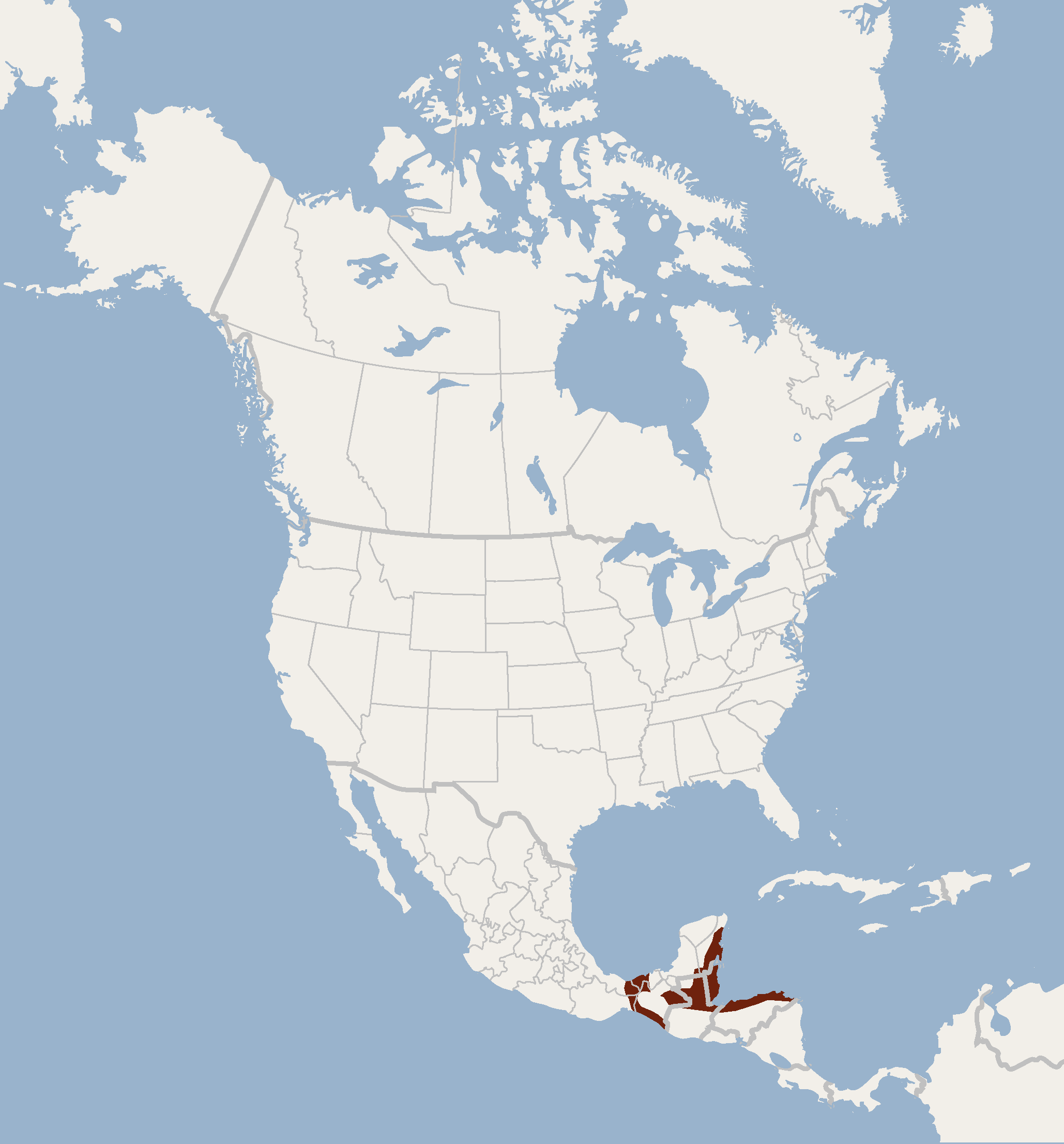

Synonyms
- Tonatia evotis Davis & Carter, 1978

= Davis's round-eared bat =

Species of bat

Davis's round-eared bat (Lophostoma evotis) is a species of bat in the family Phyllostomidae. It is found in Belize, Guatemala, Honduras, and southeastern Mexico.

== Description ==
Its ears are long with rounded tips. Its fur is dark gray. Its forearm length is 47–53 mm (1.9–2.1 in). Individuals weigh approximately 20 g (0.71 oz). Its dental formula is 2.1.2.31.1.3.3 for a total of 32 teeth.

It is both frugivorous and insectivorous.

== Range and habitat ==
It is endemic to Central America; its range includes Belize, Guatemala, Honduras, and Mexico. It has only been documented in lowlands. In Mexico, it has not been documented above 200 m (660 ft) above sea level.

As of 2018, it is evaluated as a least-concern species by the IUCN.
