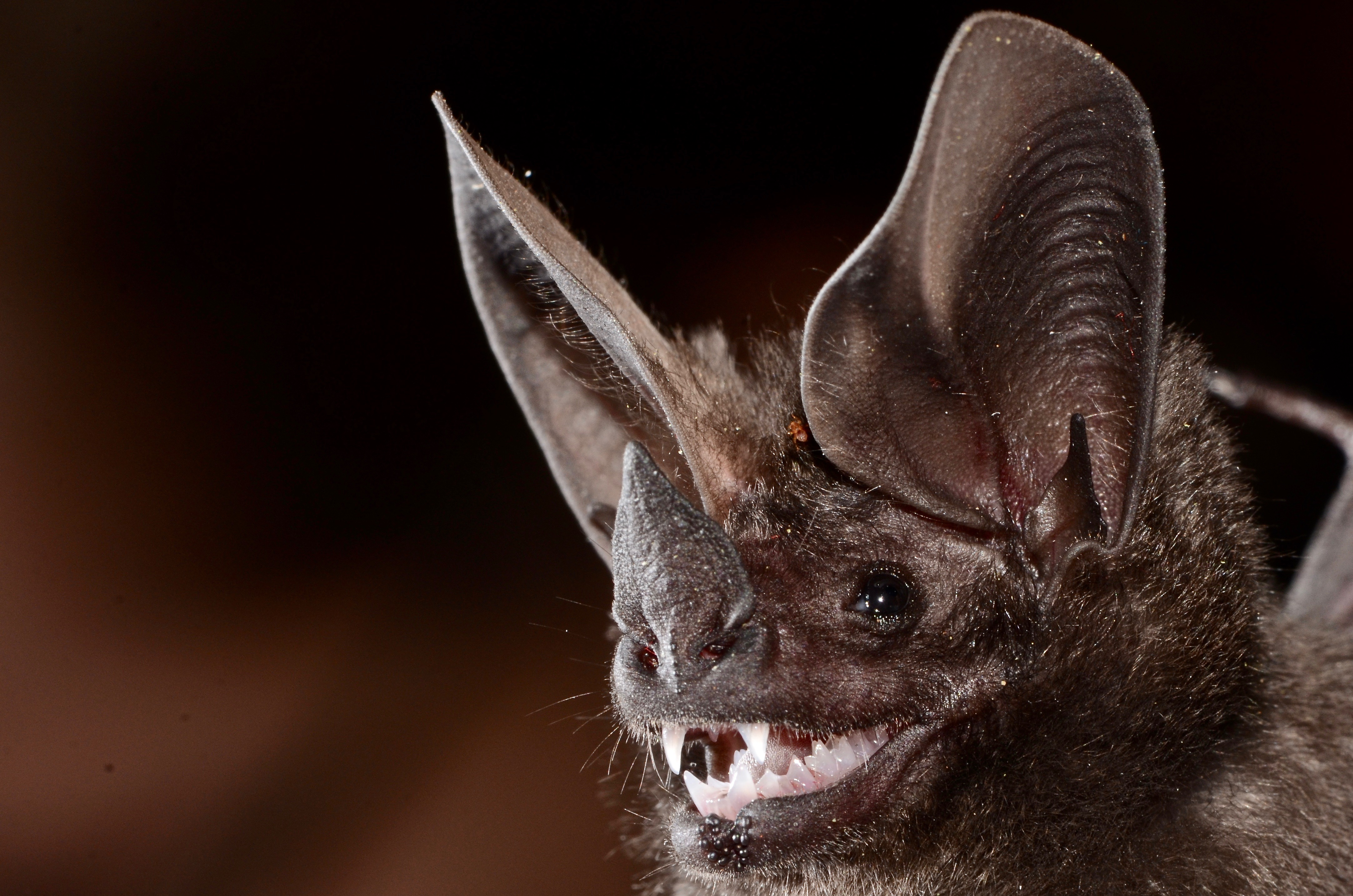

Conservation status
- Least Concern (IUCN 3.1)

Scientific classification
- Kingdom: Animalia
- Phylum: Chordata
- Class: Mammalia
- Order: Chiroptera
- Family: Phyllostomidae
- Genus: Lophostoma
- Species: L. brasiliense

Binomial name
- Lophostoma brasiliense Peters, 1866
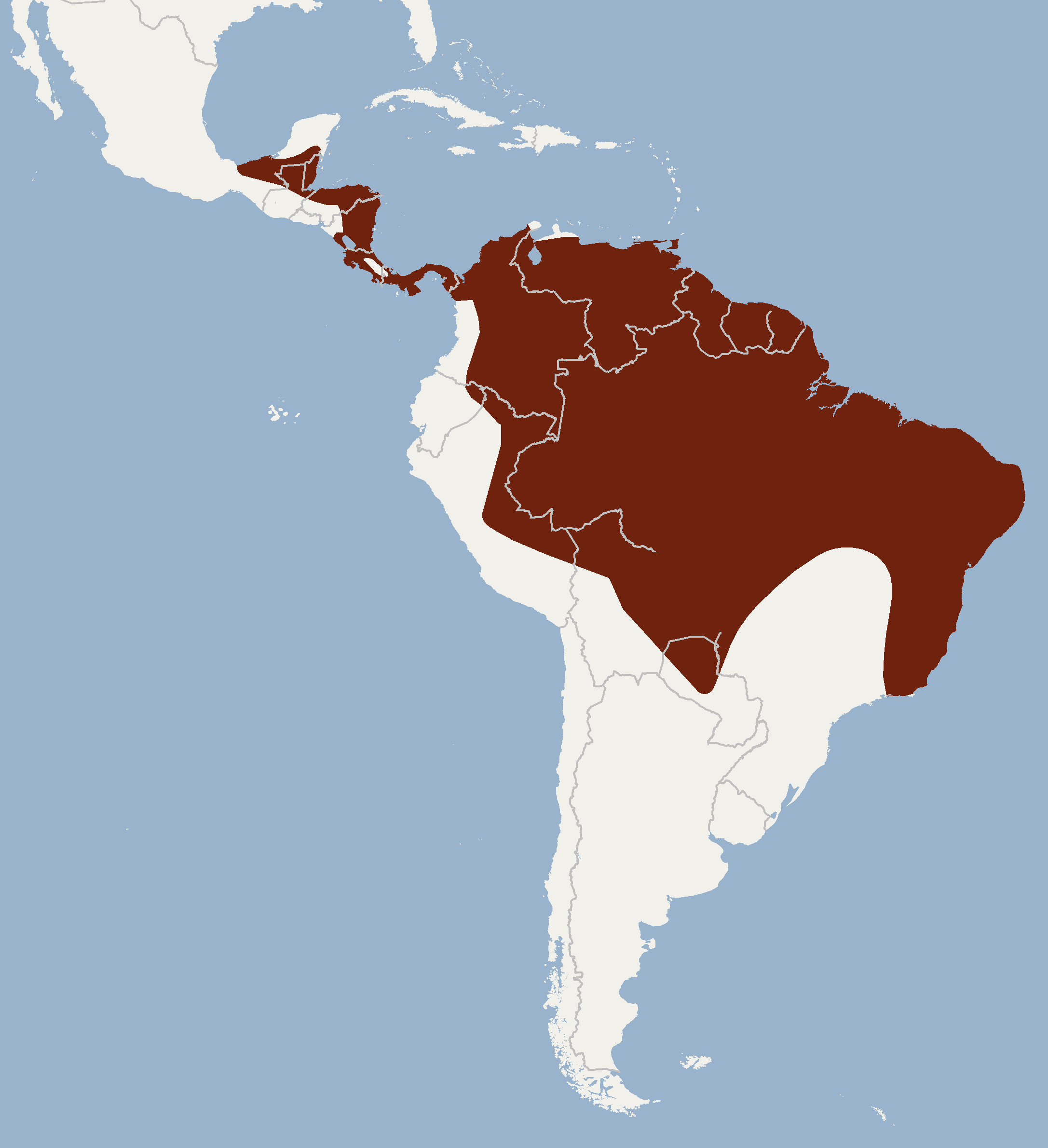

= Pygmy round-eared bat =

Species of bat

The pygmy round-eared bat (Lophostoma brasiliense) is a bat species from South America.

== Description ==
Its ears are large with rounded tips. Its upper lip has several small warts. The fur is dark brown or black in color. Its forearm is 33–36 mm (1.3–1.4 in) long. Individuals weigh 9–11 g (0.32–0.39 oz). Its dental formula is 2.1.2.31.1.3.3 for a total of 32 teeth.

== Biology and ecology ==
It is insectivorous, though it may also consume fruit. It is nocturnal, roosting in sheltered places during the day such as hollow trees or within termite mounds.

== Range and habitat ==
The northernmost extent of its range is from eastern slopes of the Andes in Colombia, Ecuador, Peru, and Bolivia and extends through to Orinoquia and eastern Amazonia in Venezuela, Guyana, Suriname, French Guiana, and Brazil. The southern limit includes the states of Presidente Hayes in central Paraguay (lower (wet) Chaco), Mato Grosso do Sul (Cerrado), São Paulo, Rio de Janeiro and Espirito Santo (Atlantic Forest) in Brazil. It is also present in the Island of Trinidad.

As of 2016, it was evaluated as a least-concern species by the IUCN.
