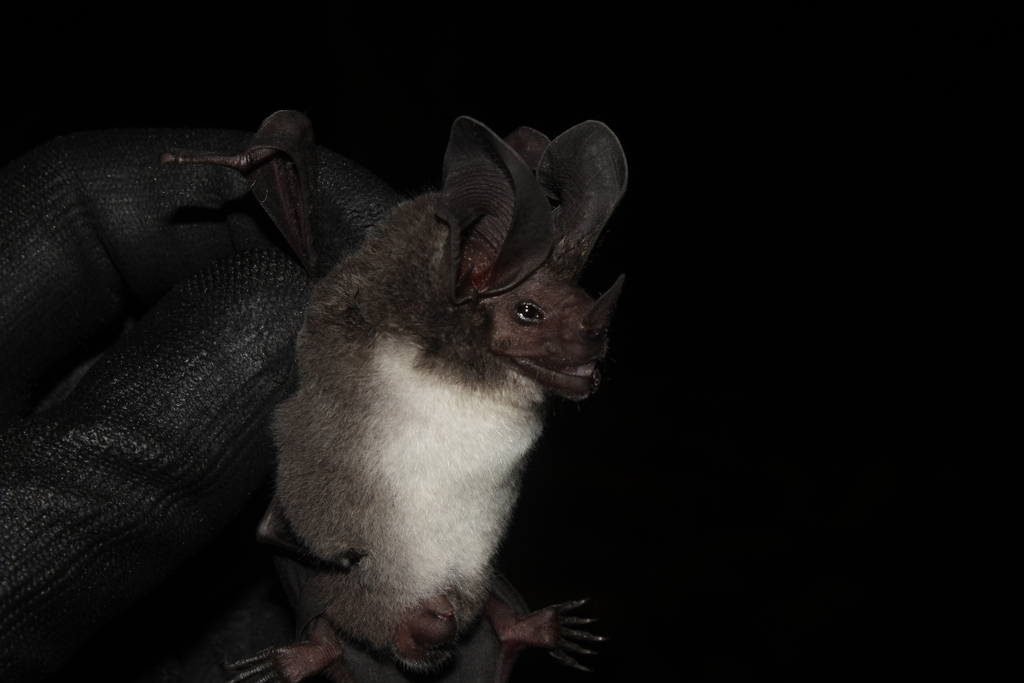

Conservation status
- Least Concern (IUCN 3.1)

Scientific classification
- Kingdom: Animalia
- Phylum: Chordata
- Class: Mammalia
- Order: Chiroptera
- Family: Phyllostomidae
- Genus: Lophostoma
- Species: L. carrikeri

Binomial name
- Lophostoma carrikeri Allen, 1910
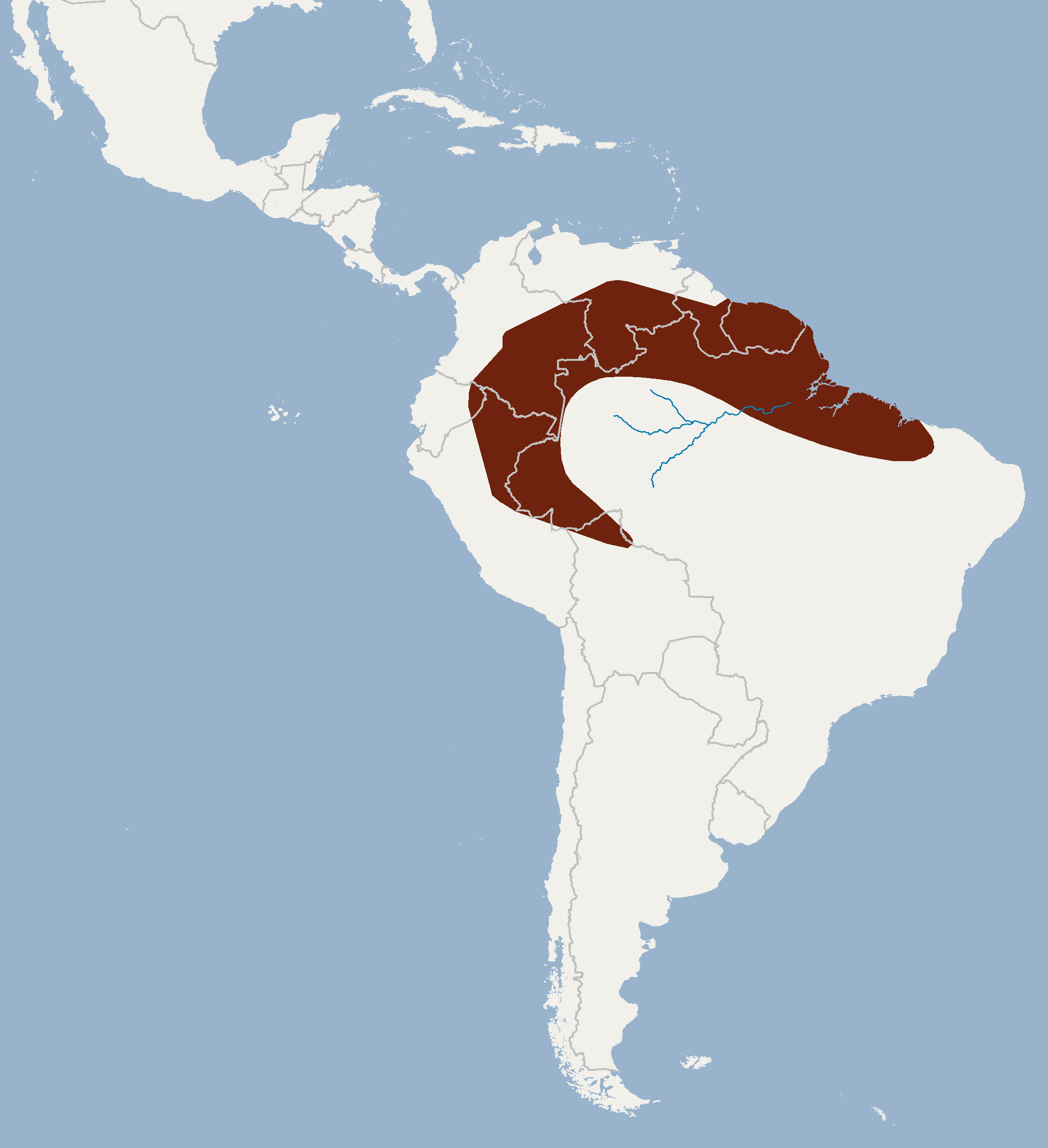

= Carriker's round-eared bat =

Species of bat

Carriker's round-eared bat (Lophostoma carrikeri) is a bat species found in Bolivia, Brazil, Colombia, Guyana, Peru, Suriname and Venezuela. It was discovered by and named for Melbourne A. Carriker, Jr.
