= Fibrobacter succinogenes =

Scientific classification
- Domain: Bacteria
- Kingdom: Pseudomonadati
- Phylum: Fibrobacterota
- Class: Fibrobacteria
- Order: Fibrobacteriales
- Family: Fibrobacteraceae
- Genus: Fibrobacter
- Species: F. succinogenes

Binomial name
- Fibrobacter succinogenes (Hungate, 1950) Montgomery et al. 1988

Subspecies
- Fibrobacter succinogenes subsp. elongatus Montgomery et al. 1988; Fibrobacter succinogenes subsp. succinogenes (Hungate 1950) Montgomery et al. 1988

Synonyms
- Bacteroides succinogenes Hungate, 1950; Ruminobacter succinogenes (Hungate, 1950) Prevot, 1966

Species of bacterium

Fibrobacter succinogenes is a cellulolytic bacterium species in the genus Fibrobacter. It is present in the rumen of cattle. F. succinogenes is a gram negative, rod-shaped, obligate anaerobe that is a major contributor to cellulose digestion. Since its discovery in the 1950s, it has been studied for its role in herbivore digestion and cellulose fermentation, which can be utilized in biofuel production.

== History ==
Fibrobacter succinogenes was isolated in 1954 by M.P. Bryant and R.N. Doetsch from bovine rumen at the University of Maryland. They isolated 8 different strains – S23, S61, S85, S111, S121, C2, M13, and M34, all of which belonged to one species – Bacteroides succinogenes. This species would later be renamed Fibrobacter succinogenes. S85 would soon become a model strain for research, and it continues to be representative of wild type species.

== Genome ==
The genome of F. succinogenes is 3.84 Megabasepairs and is predicted to consist of 3085 open reading frames. Many of these genes encode for carbohydrate binding molecules, glycoside hydrolases, and other enzymes. Thirty-one genes are identified as cellulases. The genome also encodes for a number of proteins capable of breaking down sugars, but it lacks the machinery to transport and use all the products except for those derived from cellulose.

== Relationship to other bacteria ==
Phylogenetic studies based RpoC and Gyrase B protein sequences, indicate that Fibrobacter succinogenes is closely related to the species from the phyla Bacteroidetes and Chlorobi. Fibrobacter succinogenes and the species from these two other phyla also branch in the same position based upon conserved signature indels in a number of important proteins. Lastly and most importantly, comparative genomic studies have identified two conserved signature indels (a 5-7 amino acid insert in the RpoC protein and a 13-16 amino acid insertion in serine hydroxymethyltransferase) and one signature protein (PG00081) that are uniquely shared by Fibrobacter succinogenes and all of the species from Bacteroidetes and Chlorobi phyla. All of these results provide compelling evidence that Fibrobacter succinogenes shared a common ancestor with Bacteroidetes and Chlorobi species exclusive of all other bacteria, and these species should be recognized as part of a single "FCB"superphylum.

== Metabolism ==
Fibrobacter succinogenes utilizes an orthogonal lignocellulose metabolism making it an efficient degrader of cellulose. This unique metabolism differs from other model cellulose degraders like Clostridium thermocellum and Trichoderma reesei which use cellulosomes and cellulose secretion systems, respectively. Cell adhesion to their cellulosic substrate is suggested to play a role in efficiency which could explain why F. succinogenes is such an efficient degrader. Fibrobacter succinogenes forms characteristic grooves in crystalline cellulose, and is readily detached from its substrate during sample preparation.

Fibrobacter succinogenes main metabolic machinery is in the cell envelope or periplasmic space. Depending on the type available cellulose, this bacteria will make a different set of proteins and enzymes necessary to degrade each type. It's been found that the degradation enzymes covalently bind to the outer surface of the cell. These enzymes have carbohydrate binding molecules that improve degradation by bringing substrates closer to the active sites of degradation enzymes. F. succinogenes is capable of breaking down many sugars, but only so that it can gain better access to cellulose, it sole food source. When grown on cellulose, the cell down-regulates other surface sugars and proteins, but and up-regulation of surface lipids. This regulation of other surface elements favors the formation and use of cellulose degrading enzymes. Beta glucans are the substrate of choice in the rumen and the products after digestion include formate, acetate, and succinate.

No amino acids are required for growth, so NH4+ is the sole nitrogen source essential to protein production. PO4---, NH4+, Mg++, Ca++, K+, and Na+ are all essential for growth. F. succinogenes can use glucose, but grows best on cellulose in the absence of glucose.

== Application to biofuels ==
Biofuel production currently relies on use of feedstocks that could also be used for food. Alternative sources of feedstocks are available, but expensive to use. Cellulose, hemi-cellulose and lignocellulose can be used as alternatives. Using these sources to make biofuel is a 2 step process – 1. saccharification 2. fermentation. Saccharification is a pre-treatment that creates viable sugars for fermentation and is the bottlenecking step due to being expensive and energy intensive. Current feedstocks, such as corn grain, can skip this step since they are high in starches and can be readily fermented.

Since Fibrobacter succinogenes is an efficient saccharifier of cellulose, it has a potential to be used in the biological degradation of cellulose for biofuel production.

== See also ==
- Fssl, a restriction enzyme found in F. succinogenes
- List of methanogens in digestive tract of ruminants
