= Chitinispirillum =

Scientific classification
- Domain: Bacteria
- Kingdom: Pseudomonadati
- Phylum: Fibrobacterota
- Class: Chitinispirillia; Sorokin et al. 2016
- Order: Chitinispirillales; Sorokin et al. 2016
- Family: Chitinispirillaceae; Sorokin et al. 2016
- Genus: Chitinispirillum; Sorokin et al. 2016
- Species: C. alkaliphilum

Binomial name
- Chitinispirillum alkaliphilum Sorokin et al. 2016

Genus of bacteria

Chitinispirillum is a genus of bacteria with one known species, Chitinispirillum alkaliphilum. It is the only member of the family Chitinispirillaceae, order Chitinivibrionales, and class Chitinivibrionia. Chitinispirillum alkaliphilum has been isolated from hypersaline lake sediments from the Wadi el Natrun valley in Egypt.
