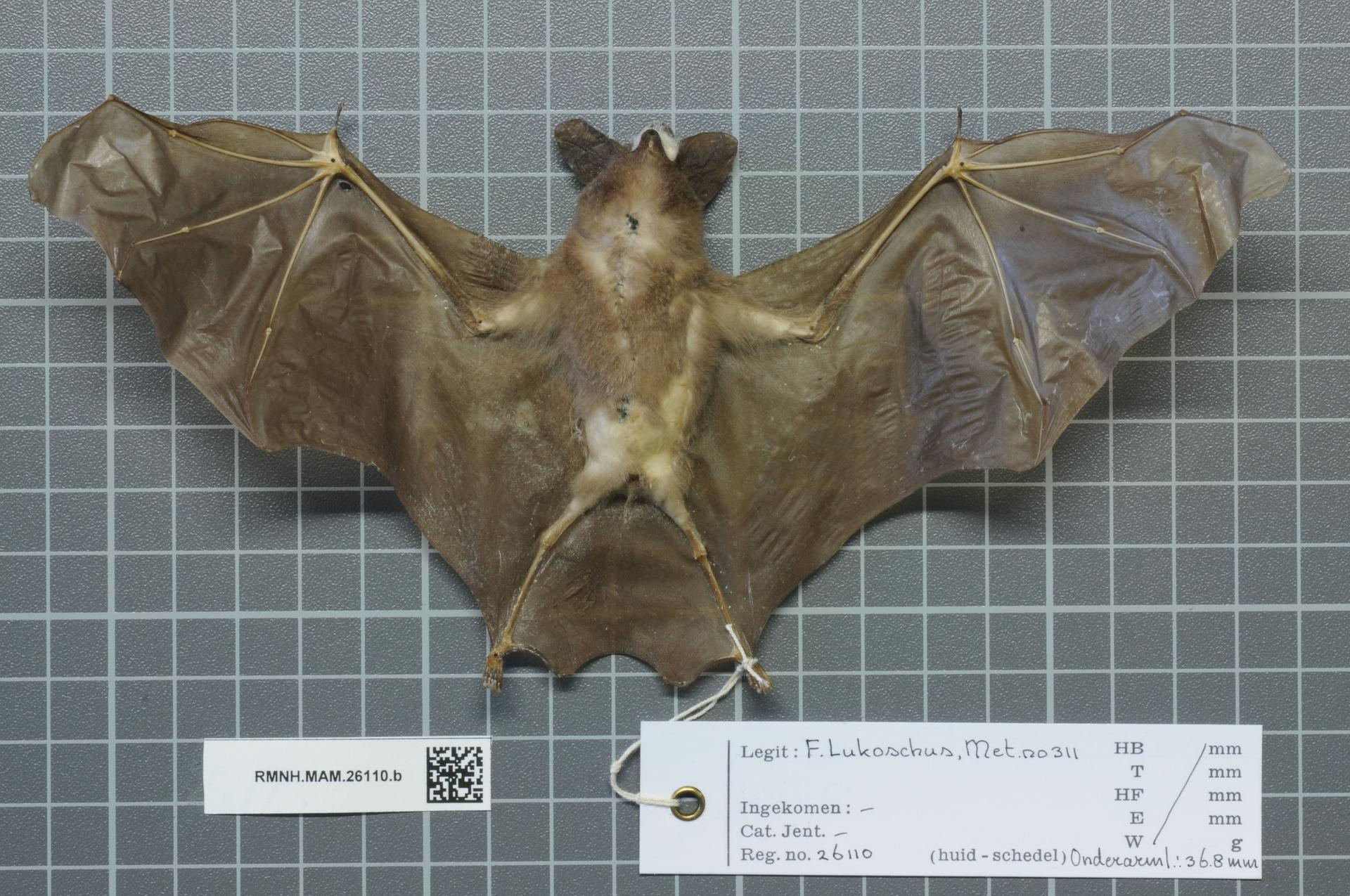

Conservation status
- Least Concern (IUCN 3.1)

Scientific classification
- Kingdom: Animalia
- Phylum: Chordata
- Class: Mammalia
- Order: Chiroptera
- Family: Phyllostomidae
- Genus: Lophostoma
- Species: L. schulzi

Binomial name
- Lophostoma schulzi (Genoways & Williams, 1980)
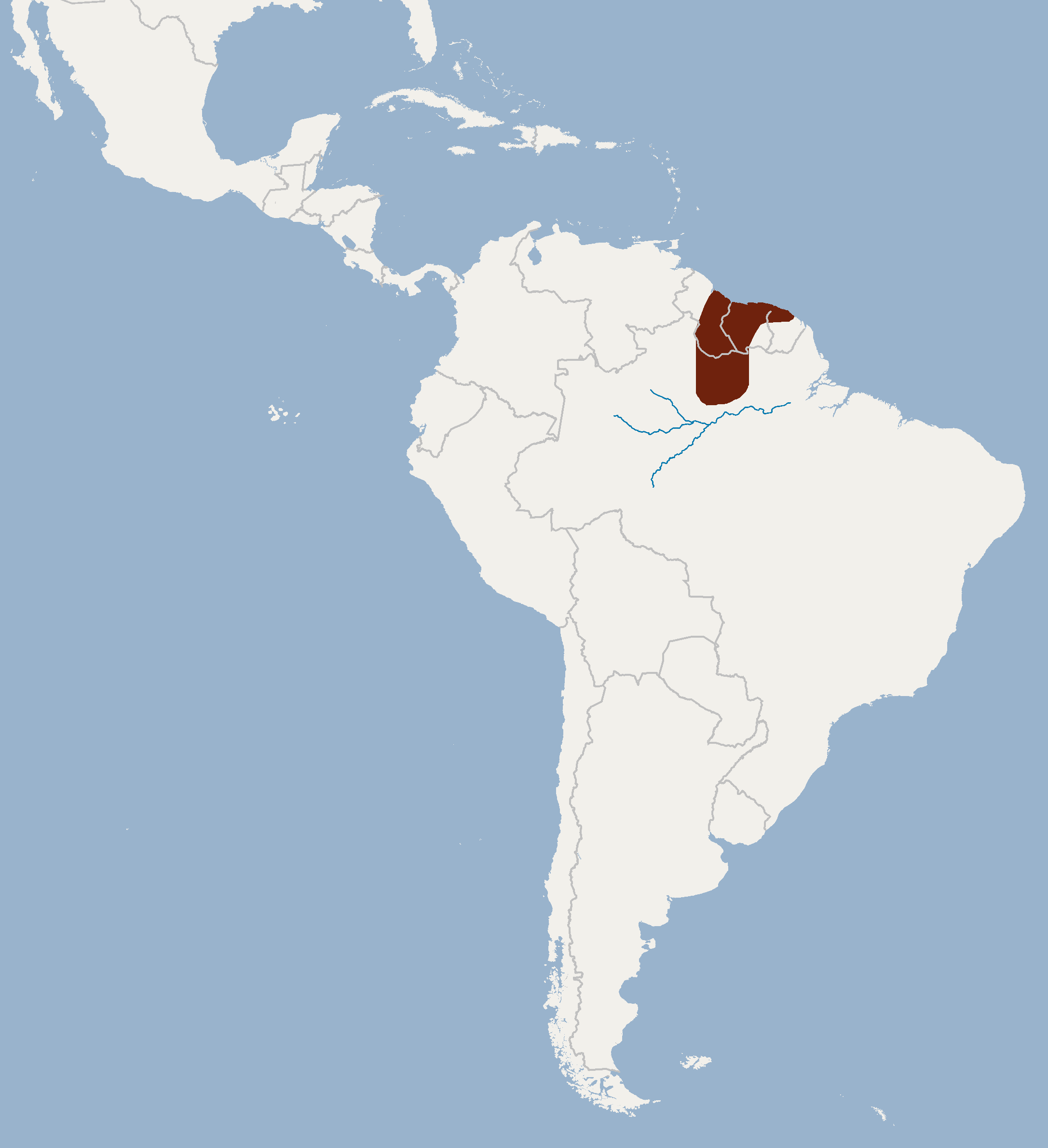

Synonyms
- Tonatia schulzi Genoways & Williams, 1980

= Schultz's round-eared bat =

Species of bat

Schultz's round-eared bat (Lophostoma schulzi) is a species of bat in the family Phyllostomidae. It is found in Brazil, French Guiana, Guyana, and Suriname.
