= Methanogens in digestive tract of ruminants =

Methanogens are a group of microorganisms that produce methane as a byproduct of their metabolism. They play an important role in the digestive system of ruminants. The digestive tract of ruminants contains four major parts: rumen, reticulum, omasum and abomasum. The food with saliva first passes to the rumen for breaking into smaller particles and then moves to the reticulum, where the food is broken into further smaller particles. Any indigestible particles are sent back to the rumen for rechewing. The majority of anaerobic microbes assisting the cellulose breakdown occupy the rumen and initiate the fermentation process. The animal absorbs the fatty acids, vitamins and nutrient content on passing the partially digested food from the rumen to the omasum. This decreases the pH level and initiates the release of enzymes for further breakdown of the food which later passes to the abomasum to absorb remaining nutrients before excretion. This process takes about 9–12 hours.

Some of the microbes in the ruminant digestive system are:

- Fibrobacter (Bacteroides) succinogenes is a gram negative, cellulolytic and amylolytic methanogen that produces formates, acetates and succinates.
- Ruminococcus albus is a cellulolytic, xylanolytic bacterium producing ethanol, hydrogen, carbon dioxide, formates and acetates.
- Ruminococcus flavefaciens is a cellulolytic, xylanolytic bacteria producing formates, acetates, hydrogen and succinates.
- Butyrivibrio fibrisolvens is a proteolytic, cellulolytic, xylanolytic microbe producing lactate, butyrate, ethanol, hydrogen, carbon dioxide, formates and acetates.
- Streptococcus bovis is an amylolytic, major soluble sugar fermenter, proteolytic, microbe resulting in lactate, acetate and formate.
- Ruminobacter (Bacteroides) amylophilus amylolytic, propionate, proteolytic, organism that forms, formates, acetates and succinates.
- Prevotella (Bacteroides) ruminocola amylolytic, xylanolytic, propionate, proteolytic, microbe that creates, formates, acetates, succinates and propionate.
- Succinimonas amylolytica amylolytic, dextrinolytic, bacteria forming acetates and succinates.
- Selenomonas ruminantium amylolytic, major soluble sugar fermenter, glycerol-utilizing, lactate-utilizing, proteolytic, microbe producing acetates, lactates, hydrogen, carbon dioxide and propionates.
- Lachnospira multiparus propionate, proteolytic, A microbe that results in production of lactate, ethanol, hydrogen, carbon dioxide, formates and acetates.
- Succinivibrio dextrinosolvens propionate, dextrinolytic, bacteria forming formates, acetates, lactates and succinates
- Methanobrevibacter ruminantium methanoic, hydrogen utilizing, archaea involved in the creation of methane
- Methanosarcina barkeri methanoic, hydrogen utilizing, archaea involved in the creation of methane and carbon dioxide.
