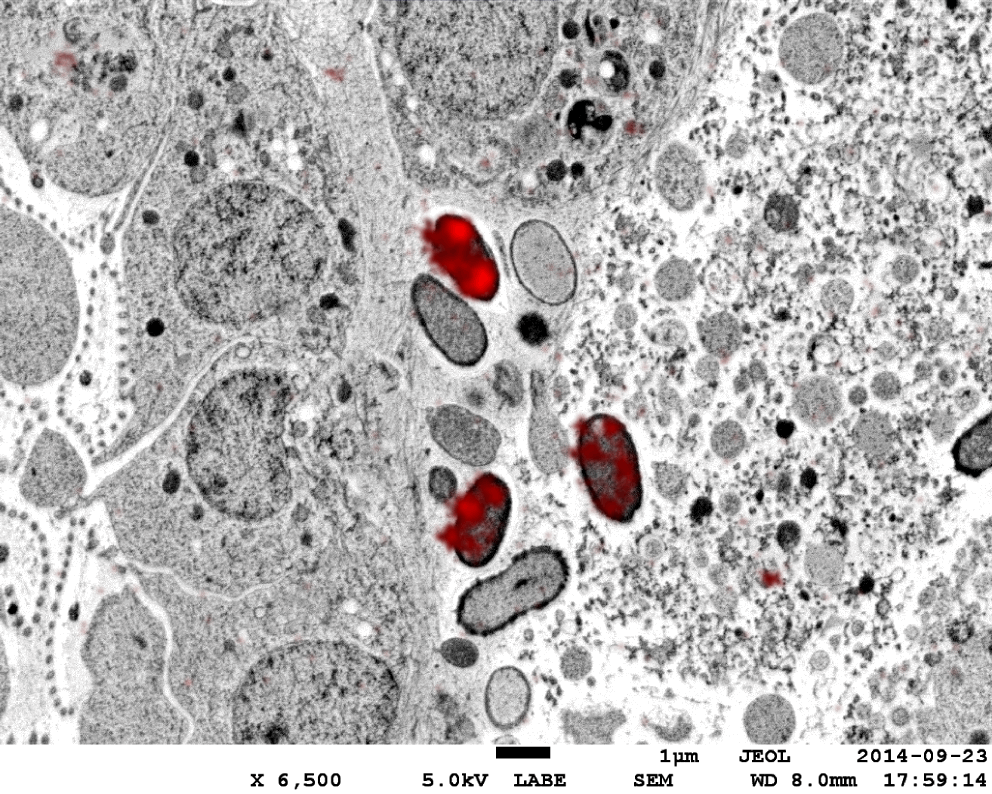
- Poribacteria localisation in the sponge Aplysina aerophoba

Scientific classification (Candidatus)
- Domain: Bacteria
- Kingdom: Pseudomonadati
- Phylum: Poribacteria; Fiesler et al. 2004

Synonyms
- "Poribacteriota" corrig. Fiesler et al. 2004

= Poribacteria =

Phylum of bacteria

Poribacteria are a candidate phylum of bacteria originally discovered in the microbiome of marine sponges (Porifera). Poribacteria are Gram-negative primarily aerobic mixotrophs with the ability for oxidative phosphorylation, glycolysis, and autotrophic carbon fixation via the Wood – Ljungdahl pathway. Poribacterial heterotrophy is characterised by an enriched set of glycoside hydrolases, uronic acid degradation, as well as several specific sulfatases. This heterotrophic repertoire of poribacteria was suggested to be involved in the degradation of the extracellular sponge host matrix.

== Genome ==
Single-cell genomics and metagenomic shotgun sequencing approaches reveal a poribacterial genome size range between about 4.2 and 6.5 megabases encoding 4,254 protein-coding genes, of which an unusually high 24% have no homology to known genes. Among the genes of identifiable homology, reconstructed pathways suggest that the poribacterial central metabolism is capable of glycolysis, tricarboxylic acid cycle, pentose phosphate pathways, oxidative phosphorylation, the Entner-Doudoroff pathway, and autotrophic carbon fixation via Wood–Ljungdahl pathway. Further, Poribacteria seem to engage in assimilatory denitrification and ammonia scavenging with potential relevance in nitrogen re-cycling within the sponge holobiont. The poribacterial genome is also reported to contain an unusually high number of phage defence systems including CRISPR-CAS and restriction modification systems.

== Cell compartmentalization ==
Cell compartmentalization into distinct membrane-bound organelles is a universal and defining property of eukaryotes, but had not been observed in prokaryotes other than the Planctomycetota. Poribacteria were previously thought to be distinguished from other microorganisms associated with marine sponges by such a distinctive morphology featuring a large membrane-bound cellular compartment that was suggested to contain DNA. The distinctive poribacterial compartments were originally identified using fluorescence in situ hybridization and electron microscopy. Genomic evidence suggests the presence of protein-bound organelles, but not for membrane-bound organelles. More recently, correlative light-electron microscopy, confirmed two elements of poribacterial subcellular compartmentation: Firstly, Bacterial microcompartments, atypically localized at the cell membrane. Secondly, spherical bipolar compartments which are discussed to be most likely carbon rich storage polymers such as Polyhydroxybutyrate.

== Eukaryote-like proteins ==
Genomic analyses of poribacteria reveal several families of cell-surface repeat proteins that resemble those found in eukaryotes, and are infrequently found in prokaryotes. Examples include ankyrin and leucine-rich repeat domains, as well as tetratricopeptides. Unusual low-density lipoprotein receptor repeat proteins are also found, of unknown function. Most of these protein families are thought to be involved in surface interactions with the sponge host. In addition, genetic infrastructure for sterol biosynthesis is observed in poribacterial genomes, otherwise found almost exclusively in eukaryotes and the planctomycete Gemmata obscuriglobus.

== Ecological niche ==
Poribacteria are symbionts of marine sponges, among the most abundant microorganisms in the highly diverse microbiome of the sponge mesohyl. They have been found in a large variety of sponge species from diverse geographic origins. The composition of microorganisms in the sponge microbiome can be vertically inherited, with adult sponges transmitting their distinctive microbial communities to offspring.

== See also ==
- List of bacteria genera
- List of bacterial orders
