= Dolichoderus diversus =

Scientific classification
- Domain: Eukaryota
- Kingdom: Animalia
- Phylum: Arthropoda
- Class: Insecta
- Order: Hymenoptera
- Family: Formicidae
- Subfamily: Dolichoderinae
- Genus: Dolichoderus
- Species: D. diversus

Binomial name
- Dolichoderus diversus Emery, 1894

Synonyms
- Dolichoderus championi Forel, 1899; Dolichoderus championi ornatus Mann, 1916; Dolichoderus championi taeniatus Wheeler, W.M., 1916; Dolichoderus championi trinidadensis Forel, 1899; Dolichoderus germaini garbei Forel, 1911; Dolichoderus germaini leviusculus Emery, 1906; Iridomyrmex mazaruni Donisthorpe, 1939

Species of ant

Dolichoderus diversus is a species of ant in the genus Dolichoderus. Described by Emery in 1894, the species has a widespread distribution in multiple countries, including Brazil, Colombia, Costa Rica, Ecuador, Guyana, Mexico, Panama, Trinidad and Tobago and Venezuela.
