= Chryseobacterium balustinum =

Scientific classification
- Domain: Bacteria
- Kingdom: Pseudomonadati
- Phylum: Bacteroidota
- Class: Flavobacteriia
- Order: Flavobacteriales
- Family: Weeksellaceae
- Genus: Chryseobacterium
- Species: C. balustinum

Binomial name
- Chryseobacterium balustinum Vandamme et al. 1994

Type strain
- ATCC 33487, BCRC 17332, BCRC 17361, C. Tysset, CCM 4450, CCRC 17332, CCRC 17361, CCTM 724, CCTM La 724, CCUG 13228, CIP 103103, DSM 16775, IAM 14209, IFO 15053, JCM 21074, KCTC 2903, LA 724, LMG 4010, LMG 8329, NBRC 15053, NCIMB 2270, NCTC 11212, V. Bonifas La 724

Synonyms
- Flavobacterium balustinum

Species of bacterium

Chryseobacterium balustinum is a bacterium from the genus Chryseobacterium which has been isolated from blood from a fish in Lausanne in Switzerland.
