= Fibrobacterota =

Scientific classification
- Domain: Bacteria
- Kingdom: Pseudomonadati
- Phylum: Fibrobacterota; Garrity & Holt 2021

Classes
- Chitinispirillia; Chitinivibrionia; Fibrobacteria

Synonyms
- "Fibrobacteraeota" Oren et al. 2015; "Fibrobacteres" Garrity and Holt 2001; "Fibrobacterota" Whitman et al. 2018; "Raymondbacteria" Anantharaman et al. 2016

Phylum of bacteria

Fibrobacterota is a small bacterial phylum which includes many of the major rumen bacteria, allowing for the degradation of plant-based cellulose in ruminant animals. Members of this phylum were categorized in other phyla. The genus Fibrobacter was removed from the genus Bacteroides in 1988.

== Phylogeny and comparative genomic studies ==
Although Fibrobacterota is currently recognized as a distinct phylum, phylogenetic studies based RpoC and Gyrase B protein sequences, indicate that Fibrobacter succinogenes is closely related to the species from the phyla Bacteroidetes and Chlorobi. The species from these three phyla also branch in the same position based upon conserved signature indels in a number of important proteins. Lastly and most importantly, comparative genomic studies have identified two conserved signature indels (a 5-7 amino acid insert in the RpoC protein and a 13-16 amino acid insertion in serine hydroxymethyltransferase) and one signature protein (PG00081) that are uniquely shared by all of the species from these three phyla. All of these results provide compelling evidence that the species from these three phyla shared a common ancestor exclusive of all other bacteria and it has been proposed that they should all recognized as part of a single “FCB”superphylum.

== Phylogeny ==
Phylogeny of Fibrobacterota.

16S rRNA based LTP_10_2024

- - - Chitinivibrionia
      - Chitinivibrionales
        - Chitinivibrionaceae
          Chitinivibrio alkaliphilus
    - Chitinispirillia
      - Chitinispirillales
        - Chitinispirillaceae
          Chitinispirillum alkaliphilum
  - - Fibrobacteria
      - Fibrobacterales Fibrobacteraceae
        - Fibrobacter succinogenes
          - F. s. elongatus
          - F. s. succinogenes
        - Hallerella
          - H. porci
          - - H. succinigenes
            - Fibrobacter intestinalis

120 marker proteins based GTDB 09-RS220

- - - Chitinivibrionia
      - Chitinivibrionales
        - Chitinispirillaceae
          Chitinispirillum alkaliphilum
        - Chitinivibrionaceae
          Chitinivibrio alkaliphilus
  - - "Raymondbacteria" (RIF7)
    - - Fibrobacteria
        - Fibrobacterales Fibrobacteraceae
          - "Ca. Fibromonas termitidis"
          - - Fibrobacter
              - F. succinogenes elongatus
              - F. succinogenes
            - Hallerella
              - H. succinigenes
              - - H. porci
                - Fibrobacter intestinalis

== Taxonomy ==
The currently accepted taxonomy is based on the List of Prokaryotic names with Standing in Nomenclature (LSPN) and National Center for Biotechnology Information (NCBI).

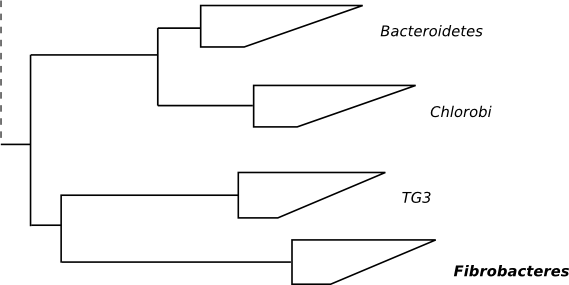
phylum Fibrobacterota and some of its phylogenetic neighbours

- Class Chitinispirillia Sorokin et al. 2016
  - Order Chitinispirillales Sorokin et al. 2016]
    - Family Chitinispirillaceae Sorokin et al. 2016
      - Genus "Cellulosispirillum" Sorokin, Merkel & Khizhniak 2025
        - Species "C. alkaliphilum" Sorokin, Merkel & Khizhniak 2025
      - Genus Chitinispirillum Sorokin et al. 2016
        - Species C. alkaliphilum Sorokin et al. 2016
- Class Chitinivibrionia Sorokin et al. 2014
  - Order Chitinivibrionales Sorokin et al. 2014
    - Family Chitinivibrionaceae Sorokin et al. 2014
      - Genus Chitinivibrio Sorokin et al. 2014
        - Species C. alkaliphilus Sorokin et al. 2014
- Class Fibrobacteria Spain et al. 2012
  - Order Fibrobacterales Spain et al. 2012 ["Fibromonadales" Abdul Rahman et al. 2016]
    - Family Fibrobacteraceae Spain et al. 2012 [Fibromonadaceae" Abdul Rahman et al. 2016]
      - Genus Fibrobacter Montgomery et al. 1988
        - Species F. intestinalis Montgomery et al. 1988
        - Species F. succinogenes (Hungate 1950) Montgomery et al. 1988
          - Subspecies F. s. elongatus Montgomery et al. 1988
          - Subspecies F. s. succinogenes (Hungate 1950) Montgomery et al. 1988
      - Genus "Candidatus Fibromonas" Abdul Rahman et al. 2016
        - Species "Ca. F. termitidis" Abdul Rahman et al. 2016
      - Genus "Hallerella" Wylensek et al. 2020
        - Species "H. porci" Wylensek et al. 2021
        - Species "H. succinigenes" Wylensek et al. 2020

== Distribution ==
The phylum Fibrobacterota is considered to be closely related to the CFB [Cytophaga-Flavibacterium-Bacteroidota]. It contains the genus Fibrobacter, which has strains present in the guts of many mammals including cattle and pigs. The two described species in this genus namely, Fibrobacter succinogenes and Fibrobacter intestinalis are important members of fibrolytic communities in mammalian guts and have received a lot of attention in recent decades due to the long-standing interest microbes capable of degrading plant fiber.

Molecular evidence based on the amplification of 16rRNA genes from various environments suggest that the phylum is much more widespread than previously thought. Most of the clones from mammalian environments group along with the known isolates in what has been called subphylum 1. Members of subphylum 2 however, have so far been found only in the gut of termites. and in some litter-feeding cockroaches. The predominance of subphylum 2 in cellulolytic fibre-associated bacterial communities in hindguts of wood-feeding Nasutitermes corniger suggests that they play an important role in the breakdown of plant material in higher termites.

== See also ==
- Fibrobacter succinogenes
- Candidate phylum TG3
- List of bacterial orders
- List of bacteria genera
