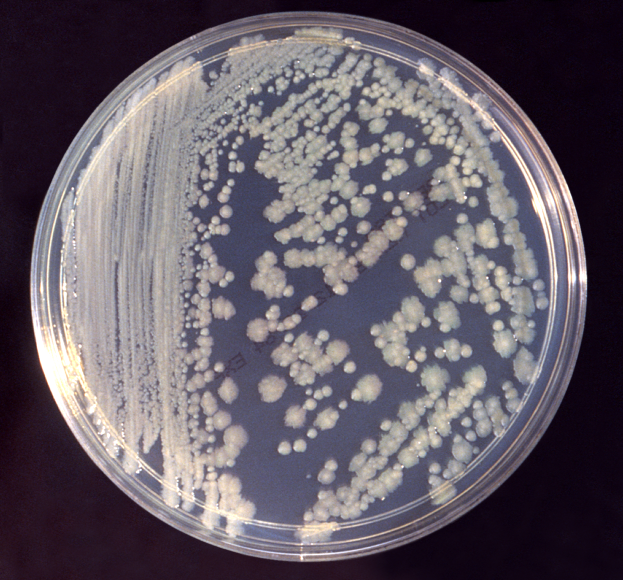
- Enterobacter cloacae on tryptic soy agar

Scientific classification
- Domain: Bacteria
- Kingdom: Pseudomonadati
- Phylum: Pseudomonadota
- Class: Gammaproteobacteria
- Order: Enterobacterales
- Family: Enterobacteriaceae
- Genus: Enterobacter
- Species: E. cloacae

Binomial name
- Enterobacter cloacae (Jordan 1890); Hormaeche and Edwards 1960

Subspecies
- Aerobacter cloacae (Jordan 1890) Hormaeche and Edwards 1958; Erwinia dissolvens (Rosen 1922) Burkholder 1948; Pseudomonas dissolvens Rosen 1922; Bacterium dissolvens Rosen 1922; Phytomonas dissolvens (Rosen 1922) Rosen 1926; Aplanobacter dissolvens (Rosen 1922) Rosen 1926; Aerobacter dissolvens (Rosen 1922) Waldee 1945; Enterobacter dissolvens (Rosen 1922) Brenner et al. 1988

= Enterobacter cloacae =

Species of bacterium

Enterobacter cloacae is a species of gram-negative, facultatively-anaerobic, rod-shaped bacterium from the order Enterobacterales. This species is a commensal of the human gastrointestinal tract and is occasionally implicated in human infections.

== Microbiology ==
In microbiology laboratories, E. cloacae is frequently grown at 30 °C on nutrient agar or at 35 °C in tryptic soy broth. It is a rod-shaped, Gram-negative bacterium, is facultatively anaerobic, and bears peritrichous flagella. It is oxidase-negative and catalase-positive.

== Industrial use ==
Enterobacter cloacae has been used in a bioreactor-based method for the biodegradation of explosives and in the biological control of plant diseases. Enterobacter cloacae strain MBB8 isolated from the Gulf of Mannar, India was reported to degrade poly vinyl alcohol (PVA). This was the first report of a PVA degrader from the Enterobacter genus. E. cloacae was also reported to produce exopolysaccharide (EPS) as high as 18.3g/L. GC-MS analysis of E. cloacae EPS showed the presence of glucose and mannose in the molar ratio of 1: 1.5e^{−2}.

Enterobacter cloacae subsp. cloacae strain PR-4 was isolated and identified by 16S rDNA gene sequence with phylogenetic tree view from explosive-laden soil by P. Ravikumar (GenBank accession number KP261833).

E. cloacae SG208 was identified as a predominant microorganism in a mixed culture isolated from petrochemical sludge (IOCL, Guwahati) which had been responsible for the degradation of benzene, as reported by Padhi and Gokhale (2016).

== Safety ==
Enterobacter cloacae is considered a biosafety level 1 organism in the United States and level 2 in Canada.

== Genomics ==
A draft genome sequence of E. cloacae subsp. cloacae was announced in 2012. The bacteria used in the study were isolated from giant panda feces.

== Clinical significance ==
E. cloacae is a member of the normal gut flora of many humans and is not usually a primary pathogen. Some strains have been associated with urinary tract and respiratory tract infections in immunocompromised individuals. It is a high risk AmpC producer and treatment with cefepime is recommended by IDSA if causing disease rather than merely colonising. Treatment using cefepime and gentamicin has been reported.

A 2012 study in which E. cloacae was transplanted into previously germ-free mice resulted in increased obesity when compared with germ-free mice fed an identical diet, suggesting a link between obesity and the presence of Enterobacter gut flora.

E. cloacae produces the endotoxin, lipopolysaccharide.

== See also ==
- Biohydrogen
- Cronobacter
