= TG3 (candidate phylum) =

Scientific classification (Candidatus)
- Domain: Bacteria
- Kingdom: incertae sedis
- Informal group: Bacteria candidate phyla
- Phylum: TG3

Phylum of termites

Candidate phylum TG3 (aka candidate division Termite Group 3 or Chitinivibrionia Sorokin et al. 2014) is a candidate phylum that is closely related to the phylum Fibrobacterota based on 16S rRNA gene phylogeny. Originally thought to be composed solely of sequences from termite guts, it was later found to be more widespread in nature.
