= Evolution of bacteria =

Development of bacteria throughout time

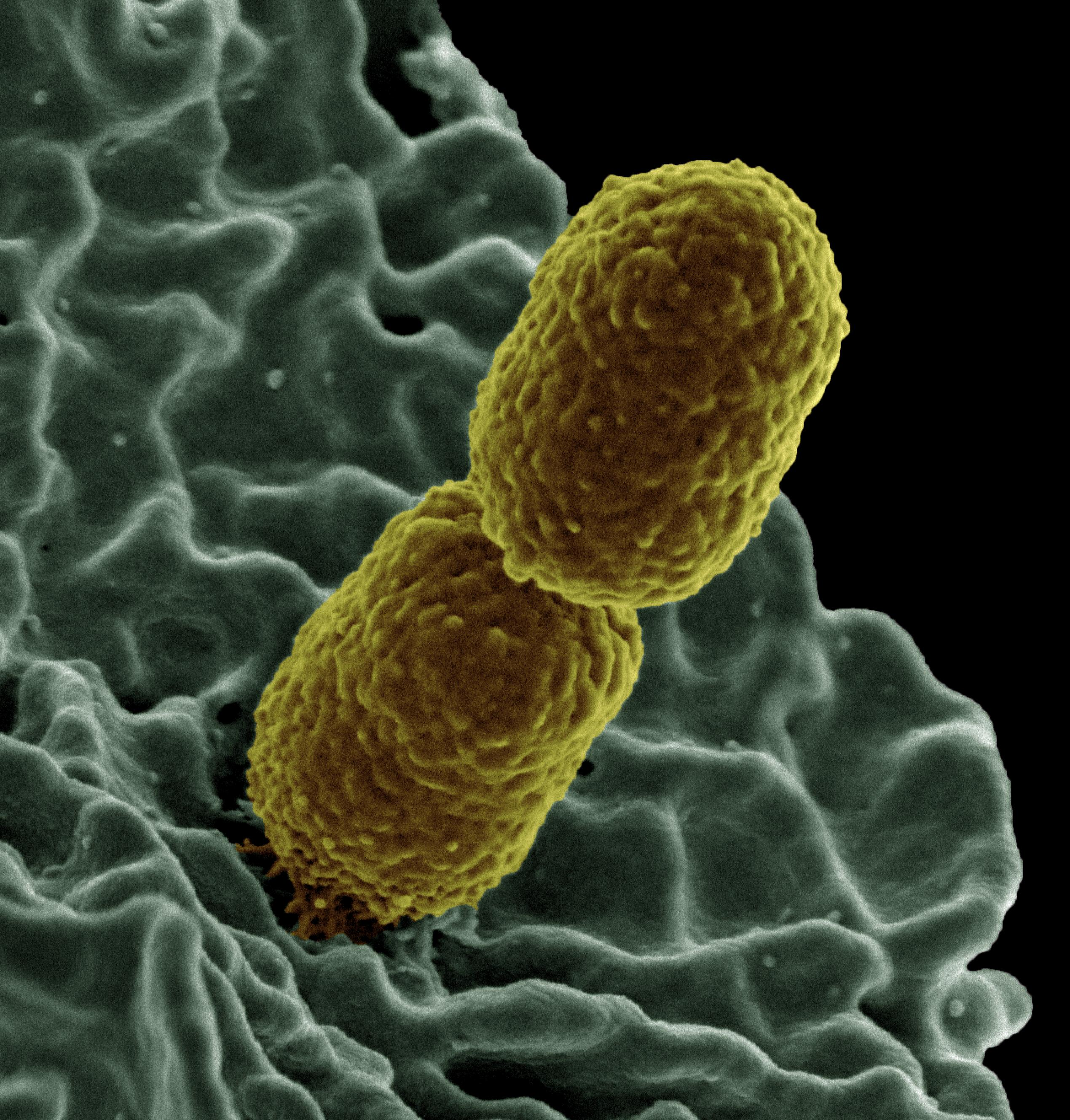
Colorized scanning electron micrograph showing carbapenem-resistant Klebsiella pneumoniae interacting with a human neutrophil.

The evolution of bacteria has progressed over billions of years since the Precambrian time with their first major divergence from the archaeal/eukaryotic lineage roughly 3.2-3.5 billion years ago. This was discovered through gene sequencing of bacterial nucleoids to reconstruct their phylogeny. Furthermore, evidence of permineralized microfossils of early prokaryotes was also discovered in the Australian Apex Chert rocks, dating back roughly 3.5 billion years ago during the time period known as the Precambrian time. This suggests that an organism similar to the phylum Thermotogota (formerly Thermotogae) was the most recent common ancestor of modern bacteria.

Further chemical and isotopic analysis of ancient rock reveals that by the Siderian period, roughly 2.45 billion years ago, oxygen had appeared. This indicates that oceanic, photosynthetic cyanobacteria evolved during this period because they were the first microbes to produce oxygen as a byproduct of their metabolic process. Therefore, this phylum was thought to have been predominant roughly 2.3 billion years ago. However, some scientists argue they could have lived as early as 2.7 billion years ago, as this was roughly before the time of the Great Oxygenation Event, meaning oxygen levels had time to increase in the atmosphere before it altered the ecosystem during this event.

The rise in atmospheric oxygen led to the evolution of Pseudomonadota (formerly proteobacteria). Today this phylum includes many nitrogen fixing bacteria, pathogens, and free-living microorganisms. This phylum evolved approximately 1.5 billion years ago during the Paleoproterozoic era.

However, there are still many conflicting theories surrounding the origins of bacteria. Even though microfossils of ancient bacteria have been discovered, some scientists argue that the lack of identifiable morphology in these fossils means they can not be utilised to draw conclusions on an accurate evolutionary timeline of bacteria. Nevertheless, more recent technological developments means more evidence has been discovered.

== Defining bacteria ==
Life timeline
← / Earth formed; ← / Earliest water; ← / LUCA; ← / Earliest fossils; ← / Atmospheric oxygen; ← / Sexual reproduction; ← / Earliest fungi; ← / Neoproterozoic oxygenation event; ← / Ediacaran biota; ← / Cambrian explosion; ← / Earliest tetrapods; ← / Earliest hominoid
(million years ago)

Bacteria are prokaryotic microorganisms that can either have a bacilli, spirilli, or cocci shape and measure between 0.5-20 micrometers. They were one of the first living cells to evolve and have spread to inhabit a variety of different habitats including hydrothermal vents, glacial rocks, and other organisms. They share characteristics with eukaryotic cells including the cytoplasm, cell membrane, and ribosomes. Some unique bacterial features include the cell wall (also found in plants and fungi), flagella (not common for all bacteria), and the nucleoid.

Bacteria can metabolise in different ways, most commonly by heterotrophic or autotrophic (either photosynthetic or chemosynthetic) processes. Bacteria reproduce through binary fission, though they can still share genetic information between individuals either by transduction, transformation, or conjugation.

=== Process of bacterial evolution ===
Bacteria evolve in a similar process to other organisms. This is through the process of natural selection, whereby beneficial adaptations are passed onto future generations until the trait becomes common within the entire population. However, since bacteria reproduce via binary fission—a form of asexual reproduction—the daughter cell and parent cell are genetically identical. This makes bacteria susceptible to environmental pressures, an issue that is overcome by sharing genetic information via transduction, transformation, or conjugation. This allows for new genetic and physical adaptations to develop, allowing bacteria to adapt to their environment and evolve. Furthermore, bacteria can reproduce in as little as 20 minutes, which allows for fast adaptation, meaning new strains of bacteria can evolve quickly. This has become an issue regarding antibiotic resistant bacteria.

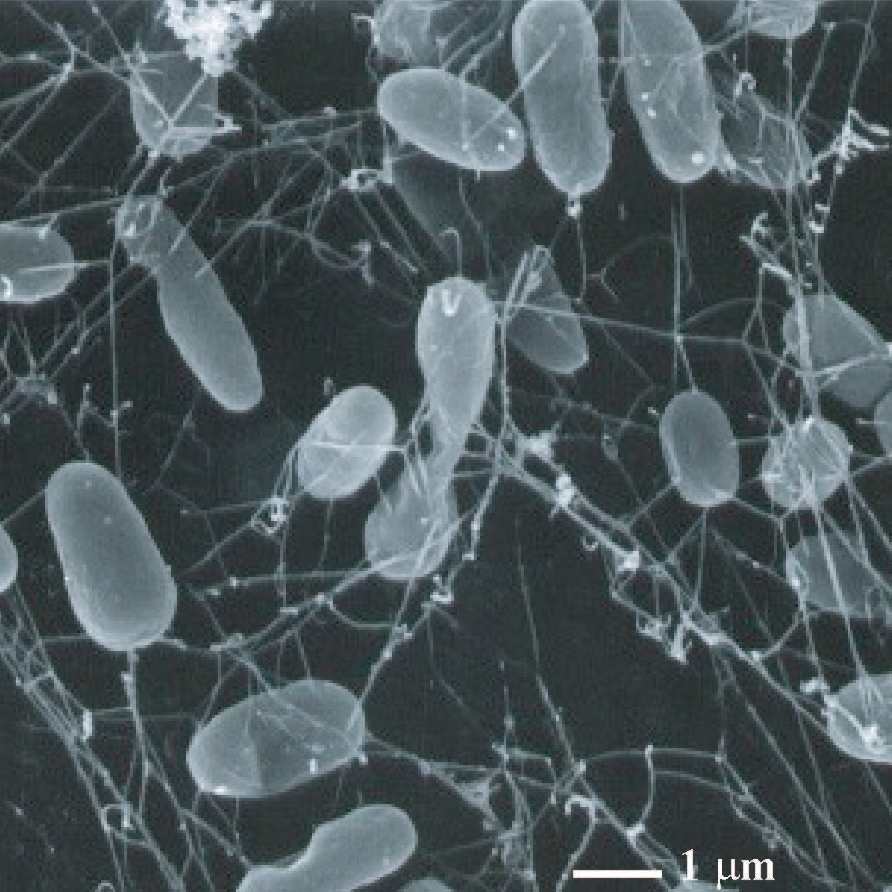
Thermophile bacteria from deep-sea vent. This organism eats sulfur and hydrogen and fixes its own carbon from carbon dioxide.

== Thermotogales ==
Thermotogota bacteria are typically thermophilic or hyperthermophilic, gram-negative staining, anaerobic organisms that can live near hydrothermal vents where temperatures can range between 55-95 °C. They are thought to be some of the earliest forms of life. Evidence of bacteria has been discovered in the Australian Apex Chert near ancient hydrothermal vents. These rocks date back 3.46 billion years and, because oxygen was not present in large quantities in Earth's early atmosphere, these fossils are thought to represent early thermophilic bacteria, which do not require oxygen to survive. Furthermore, living species such as Thermotoga neapolitana, which are thought to resemble their ancestral form, live around these vents, which some scientists have used as evidence to support this theory.

More recent evidence suggests that Thermotogales evolved roughly between 3.2-3.5 billion years ago. This evidence was collected via gene sequencing of bacterial nucleoids to reconstruct their phylogeny. The first major divergence within the Thermotogales phylum was between Thermotogaceae and Fervidobacteriaceae, however, it is yet to be determined as to when this occurred. The family of Thermotogaceae then diverged into the genus Thermotoga and the genus Pseudothermotoga. The genus Thermotoga represents the majority of existing hyperthermophiles and are unique in that they are wrapped in an outer membrane that is referred to as a "toga". Some extant Thermotoga species include T. neapolitana.

=== Thermotogale phylogeny ===
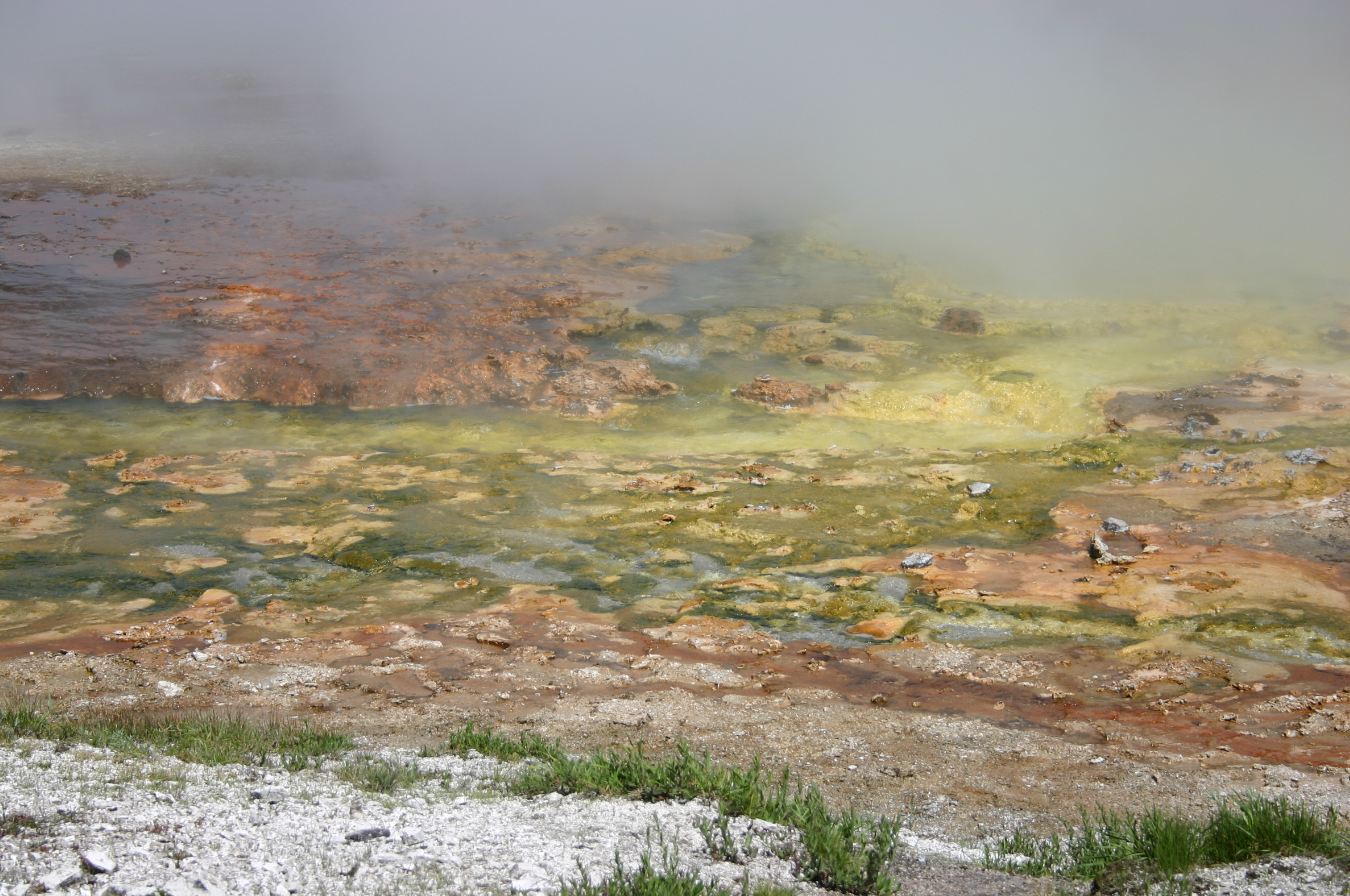
Colourful Thermophilic (Heat-loving) Archaebacteria Stain. Archaebacteria are nowadays regarded as their own domain Archaea, distinct from Thermotogales.

The phylogeny based on the work of the All-Species Living Tree Project.

- Thermotogales
  - Thermotogaceae
    - Thermotoga
      - T. naphthophila
      - - T. petrophila
        - - T. maritima (type sp.)
          - T. neapolitana
    - Pseudothermotoga
      - - P. hypogea
        - P. thermarum
      - - P. subterranea
        - - P. elfii
          - P. lettingae
  - Fervidobacteriaceae
    - Fervidobacterium
      - - F. changbaicum
        - F. islandicum
      - - F. nodosum (type sp.)
        - - F. gondwanense
          - F. riparium
    - Thermosipho
      - T. activus
      - - T. geolei
        - - T. atlanticus
          - - - T. affectus
              - T. melanesiensis
            - - T. globiformans
              - - T. africanus (type sp.)
                - T. japonicus

== Cyanobacteria ==
Cyanobacteria or blue green-algae is a gram negative bacteria, a phylum of photosynthetic bacteria that evolved between 2.3-2.7 billion years ago. This prokaryote produces oxygen as a byproduct of its photosynthetic processes. They have made a distinctive impact in pharmaceutical and agricultural industry due to their potential of making bioactive compounds with antibacterial, anti-fungal, antiviral, and anti-algal properties. Typically they form motile filaments referred to as hormogonia, which can form colonies and then bud and travel to colonise new areas. They have been located in environments including freshwater, oceans, soil and rock (both damp and dry), as well as arctic rock.

These organisms had evolved photosynthetic reaction centres and became the first oxygen producing autotrophs to appear in the fossil record. They utilise sunlight in order to drive their metabolic processes, which removes carbon dioxide from the atmosphere and releases oxygen. Due to this trait some scientist credit this phylum to causing the Great Oxygenation Event roughly 2.3 billion years ago

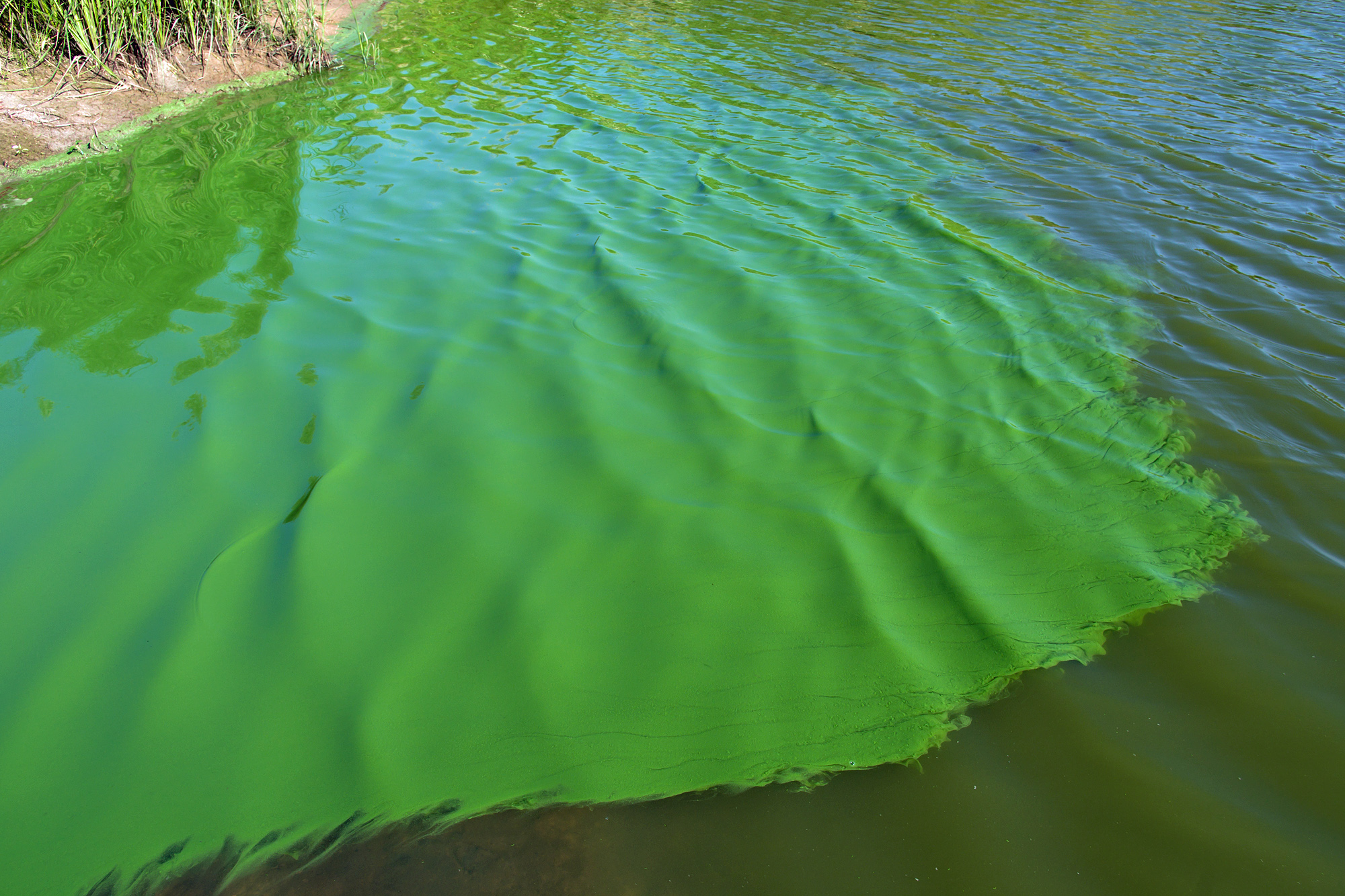
Bloom of cyanobacteria in a freshwater pond. This accumulation in one corner of the pond was caused by wind drift.

However, the closest known relatives of oxygen producing Cyanobacteria did not produce oxygen. These relatives are Melainabacteria and Sericytochromatia, neither of which can photosynthesise. Through genetic sequencing, scientists discovered that these two groups did not have any remnants of the genes required for the functioning of photosynthetic reactions. This suggests that Cyanobacteria, Melainabacteria, and Sericytochromatia evolved from a non-photosynthetic common ancestor.
