= Cloacibacillus evryensis =

Scientific classification
- Domain: Bacteria
- Kingdom: Thermotogati
- Phylum: Synergistota
- Class: Synergistia
- Order: Synergistales
- Family: Synergistaceae
- Genus: Cloacibacillus
- Species: C. evryensis

Binomial name
- Cloacibacillus evryensis Ganesan et al. 2008

Type strain
- strain 158, DSM 19522, JCM 14828

Species of bacterium

Cloacibacillus evryensis is a Gram-negative, anaerobic, mesophilic, rod-shaped and non-motile bacterium from the genus of Cloacibacillus which has been isolated from sewage sludge from a wastewater treatment plant in Évry, France.

== Phylogeny ==
Cloacibacillus evryensis is part of the genus Cloacibacillus, and was first proposed and published in 2008. There are 12 genera in the phylum: Aminiphilus, Aminobacterium, Aminomonas, Anaerobaculum, Cloacibacillus, Dethiosulfovibrio, Fretibacterium, Jonquetella, Pyramidobacter, Synergistes, Thermanaerovibrio, and Thermovirga. The only other described neighbor within the genus is C. porcorum which was discovered in the intestinal tract of a pig. A genome comparison has found a 90% similarity between the two species.

== Discovery ==
Cloacibacillus evryensis was discovered in a wastewater treatment plant in Évry, France and first described by researchers on September 1, 2008. The specific location of the isolate was a mesophilic anaerobic digester with working parameters of 33 °C, a pH of 7.2 and a retention time of 37.5 days.

=== Isolation ===
Isolation was done using the Hungate technique with an enrichment medium containing contents such as KH_{2}PO_{4}, K_{2}HPO_{4}, NaCl, SO_{4}, sodium citrate, yeast extract, Casamino acids and trace elements. After inoculation of the sample, the enrichments were incubated at 33 °C in anaerobic conditions and transferred periodically onto fresh medium. Growth was detected after 5-7 days and another isolation of the sample was inoculated onto a fresh enrichment medium and grown in anaerobic jars at 33 °C and 2 atm pressure. Cloacibacillus evryensis was one of the purified strains that was isolated from the sample.

== Morphology ==
Cloacibacillus evryensis is a Gram-negative nonmotile organism with rod shaped cells that are commonly seen as diplococci. The rod-shaped bacterium is usually 2.0-3.0 μm by 0.8-1.0 μm and typically appear light brown or transparent. A typical colony occurs individually or in pairs, with older cells forming chains of colonies.

== Genomics ==
Cloacibacillus evryensis 158 has a DNA G+C content of 55.95%. It has a total number of 3,142 genes, with 3,072 of those genes being protein coding. There are 70 RNA genes: 15 rRNA (5 5S rRNA, 5 16S rRNA, 5 23S rRNA) 48 tRNA, and 8 others.

== Physiology ==
Cloacibacillus evryensis is a mesophile that can grow in temperature conditions of 20-50 °C and between pH values of 6.5-10.0. The optimal growth conditions for C. evryenis are 37-40 °C and a pH 7.0, and the growth is enhanced by yeast extract. Under the latter conditions, the doubling time of the organism on Casamino acid medium is 15 hours. Cultures grown in Casamino medium between 0.1-2.0% weight per volume concentrations of NaCl observed growth up to 0.07% NaCl; at any higher concentration, growth is inhibited.

== Metabolism ==
Cloacibacillus evryensis is a chemoheterotroph that normally degrades amino acids but can also use mucin as a carbon source. It can ferment lysine, histidine, serine, and arginine to produce acetate, propionate, butyrate, valerate, H_{2} and CO_{2}, with acetate and butryrate being produced in the greatest amounts.

== Importance ==
Cloacibacillus evryensis belongs to a genus, Cloacibacillus, with only two identified members: C. evryensis and C. porcorum. The characterization of this organism contributes to the genus and provides further information about its features.

Studies from the 2010s have isolated C. evryensis from human soft tissue, blood, and peritoneal fluid samples, identifying it as a possible agent that may cause illness in humans. In four different case studies, C. evryensis in the bloodstream was found to cause symptoms of fever, vomiting, bleeding from the rectum, and pain associated with elimination of bowel control. In each patient, multiple tests were performed to determine the cause of the symptoms prior to finding out that the cause was this bacteria. Strain 158 is susceptible to and can be treated with Penicillin, Ampicillin and Kanamycin, but it was resistant to Vancomycin.

In the human case studies, the strain was also susceptible to Clindamycin, Cefoxitin, Meropenem, Metronidazole, and Piperacillin-tazobactam, but resistant to Vancomycin. This data raises concerns about future antibiotic resistance development. However, these cases suggest that the bacteria may be low-virulence and may be a larger threat to elderly and immunocompromised populations.
