= Thermotoga naphthophila =

Scientific classification
- Domain: Bacteria
- Kingdom: Thermotogati
- Phylum: Thermotogota
- Class: Thermotogae
- Order: Thermotogales
- Family: Thermotogaceae
- Genus: Thermotoga
- Species: T. naphthophila

Binomial name
- Thermotoga naphthophila Takahata et al. 2001

Species of bacterium

Thermotoga naphthophila is a hyperthermophilic, anaerobic, non-spore-forming, rod-shaped fermentative heterotroph, with type strain RKU-10^{T}.

== Taxonomy ==
=== Taxonomical meaning ===
The taxonomic information for Thermotoga naphthophila is the following: Domain, Bacteria; Phylum, Thermotogae ; Order, Thermotogales ^{;} Family, Thermotogaceae ; Genus, Thermotoga; Species, T. naphthophila . Thermotoga naphthophila is an anaerobic, sulfur-compound fixing, hyperthermophile. The species name is originally Greek. The term "naphtha" means a light petroleum substance that dilutes minerals to bitumen and "-philos" means love. This translation of the species name combines to form "bitumen-loving".

=== Phylogeny ===
Thermotoga naphthophila can be found under strain types RKU-10, DSM-13996, and JCM-10882T. T. naphthophila cell size ranges within 2-7 micrometers ($\mu$m) long by 0.7- 1.0 $\mu$m wide. Based on 16S rDNA sequences, Thermotoga petrophila, strain RKU-1, is the closest relative to T.naphthophila. Other close relatives of T. naphthophila include Thermotoga maritima and Thermotoga neapolitan according to 16S rDNA analysis. T. maritima has an average 5$\mu$m length. Strains isolated from oil reservoirs, but not considered a part of the T. naphthophila clade include the following species: T. subterranean, T. hypogea, and T. elfii.

== Discovery ==
Thermotoga naphthophila was discovered by Takahata et al. in the subterranean Kubiki oil reservoir of Niigata, Japan. This organism was found with another bacterium called Thermotoga petrophila, RKU-1. In order to transport the species samples, they were placed into sterile glass bottles in cooler boxes with ice. After arriving to the lab, the species were isolated on a medium of 0.2% yeast extract in artificial seawater at a pH of 7. Hydrochloric acid (HCl) was added to the sample at room temperature after taking out the yeast extract. Containers of liquid medium were placed into 30 milliliter tubes and subsequently exposed to H_{2} reduced copper furnace heat with oxygen free nitrogen. Then, sodium sulfide brought the pH of the medium to a range of 6.9-7.1 and the species were purified with Gelrite plating, an agar substitute. Thermotoga naphthophila naturally has a growth pH range of 5.4-9.0, but optimally prefers a pH of 7.0.

=== Exposure methods ===
Thermotoga naphthophila tolerance ranges for pH and sodium chloride (NaCl) concentrations were found using inoculated YE-mediums incubated at 80°C to view the species growth. Takahata et al. exposed the bacteria to various buffers in order to get a better understanding of pH effects. Various gas phases were used to expose the species growth in 10 mL mediums. Additionally, the growth of the species was exposed to 1% cellulose, kerosene, light oil, chitin, crude oil and A-heavy oil in duplicates of 30 mL mediums. Takahata et al. utilized a high performance liquid chromatography (HPLC) and guanine and cytosine (GC) concentrations to collect metabolic product data from the species. Electron acceptors such as sulfate, thiosulfate, and elemental sulfur were investigated on YE-based mediums. A polymerase chain reaction (PCR) technique was used to amplify the DNA base sequence and collect the gyrase B (gyrB) subunit gene from true micro-organisms identified above.

== Preliminary characteristics ==
=== Optimum growth ===
Thermotoga naphthophila and T. petrophila can grow at temperatures ranging between 47-88°C on yeast extract, peptone, glucose, fructose, ribose, arabinose, sucrose, lactose maltose and starch as sole carbon sources. While in the presence of thiosulfate, T. petrophila is inhibited and T. naphthophila continues growing. Elemental sulfur can be reduced to hydrogen sulfide through both T. petrophila and T. naphthophila. According to the Takahata et al. (2000), these two species are more phylogenetically related than any other Thermotoga species due to sugar use, elemental sulfur effects, and thiosulfate.

=== Genomics ===
Thermotoga naphthophila is a rod-shaped species. It has 2-7$\mu$m in length by 0.8-1.2 $\mu$m in width and multiple flagella. It also possesses a unique morphology trait exclusive to the Thermotoga genus, an outer sheath-like structure dubbed a “toga”. T. naphthophila is a hyperthermophile with an optimal temperature of 80 °C (176 °F), but can survive in 48–86 °C (118–187 °F). According to a 16S rDNA sequence analysis, its 1,809,823 GC content was 46.1 mol% which increases thermostability of the DNA.

=== Metabolism ===
Thermotoga naphthophila requires yeast extract, peptone, glucose, galactose, fructose, mannitol, ribose, arabinose, sucrose, lactose, maltose or starch as the sole carbon and energy source for nutrient requirements. Thermotoga naphthophila was unable to survive on proteins, amino acids, organic acids, alcohols, chitin, or hydrocarbons as a sole carbon and energy source. According to the Takahata et al., lactate, acetate, carbon dioxide, and hydrogen gas are its end products from glucose fermentation. Thermotoga naphthophila is unique, when compared to T. petrophila, in that it reduces elemental sulfur to hydrogen sulfide, but in the presence of elemental sulfur, its growth rate and cellular yield decrease. T. naphthophila also reduces thiosulfate to hydrogen sulfide at a lower rate. According to the previously mentioned article, the microbe's growth rate and cellular yield is not affected in the presence of thiosulfate.

=== Pathogenicity ===
No known studies have identified Thermotoga naphthophila as pathogenic. Takahata et al. observed the organism's sensitivity to various antibiotics on agar plates for 7 days at 70 °C. T. naphthophila is sensitive to 100 μg rifampicin, streptomycin, vancomycin or chloramphenicol per milliliter. Thermotoga naphthophila is a unique species of the Thermotoga genus in that it is one of the two known Thermotogales to have an operon in its genome that encodes for a phosphotransferase system sugar transporter (PTS). The PTS is a multicomponent system discovered by Saul Roseman in 1964. The PTS involves enzymes of the plasma membrane and in the cytoplasm. It is used by bacteria for active transport to intake sugar using phosphoenolpyruvate (PEP) as the source of energy. The only other known Thermotoga with a PTS sugar transporter is Thermotoga sp. RQ2.

== Significance ==
Thermotoga naphthophila RKU-10 and Thermotoga petrophila RKU-1 since both were discovered in the same area, they can provide the first information on gene distribution that occurs through horizontal gene transfer (HGT) in hydrothermal ecosystems. Microbes in the order Thermotogales are used for chemical and food industrial processes due to their extreme thermophilic activity.

Thermotoga naphthophila RKU-10 was used to clone the β-galactosidase gene which is classified as a member of the GH-42 family^{,}. Wallace et al. (2015), used the β-galactosidase gene to alleviate gastrointestinal cancer drug toxicity by observing structures and inhibition of the β-Glucuronidases micro-biome which is associated with the gene in Thermotoga naphthophila.
