= Cloacibacillus porcorum =

Scientific classification
- Domain: Bacteria
- Kingdom: Thermotogati
- Phylum: Synergistota
- Class: Synergistia
- Order: Synergistales
- Family: Synergistaceae
- Genus: Cloacibacillus
- Species: C. porcorum

Binomial name
- Cloacibacillus porcorum Looft et al. 2013

Type strain
- CCUG 62631, CL-84, DSM 25858

Species of bacterium

Cloacibacillus porcorum is a Gram-negative, anaerobic, mesophilic and non-motile bacterium from the genus of Cloacibacillus which has been isolated from the intestinal tract of a pig from Ames, Iowa in the United States.

== Taxonomy ==
Cloacibacillus porcorum is a Gram-negative, anaerobic, mesophilic, non-motile, and curved rod-shaped bacterium. Its taxonomic classification includes the domain Bacteria, phylum Synergistetes, class Synergistia, order Synergistales, family Synergistaceae, genus Cloacibacillus, and species C. porcorum. Phylogenetically, C. porcorum, designated as strain CL-84, is closely related to other members of the Cloacibacillus genus, such as Cloacibacillus evryensis, which shares similar metabolic pathways and a high similarity of 95% in genome sequencing. It also shows a 90% similarity to Synergistes jonesii, which is another related species within the Synergistetes phylum.

== Discovery ==
Cloacibacillus porcorum was first isolated and reported in 2013 by researchers, Looft, Levine, and Stanton. Strain CL-84, or later classified as C. porcorum, was isolated and identified, along with seven other Synergistetes strains, from the mucosal lining of a pig caecum from Ames, Iowa, United States. The organism was identified through various methods, including analysis of its 16S rRNA gene sequence, examination of its cellular fatty acid composition, measurement of its DNA's G+C content, and evaluation of its metabolic byproducts.

== Morphology ==
Cloacibacillus porcorum has a curved-rod shape, typically measuring 0.8–1.2 μm wide and 3.5–5.0 μm long. The bacterium possesses a thin peptidoglycan layer encompassed by an outer membrane, a defining feature of Gram-negative bacteria. This was confirmed through Gram staining and transmission electron microscopy (TEM), two common methods for visualizing bacterial structures. Notable characteristics of C. porcorum include its classification as non-motile as well as its inability to form spores or inclusion bodies. When grown under anaerobic conditions on BHIAH agar at 39 °C, colonies of C. porcorum are shiny and small (1 mm wide) and mostly clear, with a brown tint.

== Fatty acid profile ==
C. porcorum has the following fatty acid profile:

- iso-C15:0 (about 27%) – 13-Methyltetradecanoic acid, which helps the cell stay stable in its environment.
- iso-C15:0 3-OH (15%) – 3-Hydroxy-13-methyltetradecanoic acid, a branched hydroxy fatty acid which may affect how the cell interacts with water.
- iso-C17:0 (12%) – 15-Methylhexadecanoic acid, a slightly longer branched fatty acid that contributes to membrane flexibility and adaptation to anaerobic environments.
- C16:0 (10%) – palmitic acid, a straight-chain saturated fatty acid that plays a structural role in the lipid bilayer.
- Additional fatty acids in small quantities.

== Genomics ==
The genome of C. porcorum (strain CL-84ᵀ) was first sequenced as part of a broader study on swine intestinal microbes. The bacterium has a DNA G+C content of 55.1 mol% which is characteristic of its classification as a member of the phylum Synergistetes. The gyrB sequence, a conserved genetic marker, of strain CL-84ᵀ showed only 90% similarity to that of Cloacibacillus evryensis which highlights its classification as a distinct species within the genus.

C. porcorum’s 16S rRNA gene sequence is approximately 1447 base pairs long and it shares 95% similarity with C. evryensis and 90% with “Synergistes jonesii”. C. porcorum forms a distinct lineage within the genus Cloacibacillus and it clusters closely with uncharacterized Synergistetes isolates from human tissue, according to phylogenetic analyses using neighbor-joining, maximum parsimony, and maximum-likelihood methods.

== Metabolism ==
C. porcorum is a strictly anaerobic bacterium and has a proteolytic metabolism since it primarily consumes amino acids via fermentation instead of sugars. While it cannot ferment glucose, C. porcorum can consume glycoproteins such as mucin as its carbon and energy sources. The bacterium ferments specific amino acids including: serine, arginine, histidine, cysteine, and threonine. As a result, these amino acids are metabolized by C. porcorum to produce short-chain fatty acids such as acetate, propionate, formate, and butyrate. However, the butyrate is only formed when serine is fermented, and this process requires the enzyme butyryl-CoA:acetate CoA-transferase. C. porcorum’s ability to generate butyrate, which is a molecule known to stimulate mucin synthesis in host gut cells, suggests involvement of C. porcorum in gut-microbiota interactions.

Since mucin is a heavily glycosylated protein, C. porcorum is unique in its ability to degrade the protective mucus layer in the gastrointestinal tract. In fact, the bacterium can use both whole mucin and mucin-derived O-linked glycans as nutrient sources. Growth assays showed that C. porcorum could grow on mucin-associated sugars and glycosaminoglycans including N-acetylneuraminic acid (sialic acid), mannose, chondroitin sulfate, fucose, and galactose. Notably, it cannot grow on common sugars such as glucose or glutamate.

== Significance ==
The ability of C. porcorum to metabolize mucin and mucin-derived glycans puts it in a rare group of gut-associated bacteria that is capable of living on host-derived substrates; therefore, this bacterium has substantial clinical relevance. C. porcorum was identified for its clinical use when researchers detected this species in a case of monomicrobial bacteremia in a human patient. Researchers believe that C. porcorum is an opportunistic pathogen in that it relies on immunocompromised individuals and those with gastrointestinal complications to grow and spread. Due to its classification in the phylum Synergistetes, the bacterium is now being used to study the various human diseases associated with this phylum due to the clinical and pharmacological relevance of Synergistetes.
