= Thermotoga petrophila =

Scientific classification
- Domain: Bacteria
- Kingdom: Thermotogati
- Phylum: Thermotogota
- Class: Thermotogae
- Order: Thermotogales
- Family: Thermotogaceae
- Genus: Thermotoga
- Species: T. petrophila

Binomial name
- Thermotoga petrophila Takahata et al. 2001

Species of bacterium

Thermotoga petrophila is a hyperthermophilic, anaerobic, non-spore-forming, rod-shaped, fermentative heterotroph, with type strain RKU-1^{T}. T. petrophila was first discovered and isolated from an oil reservoir off of the coast of Japan and was deemed genetically distinct from its sister clades. Because these organism are found in deep, hot aquatic settings, they have become of great interest for biotechnology due to their enzymes functioning at high temperatures and pressures.

== Description ==
T. petrophila strain RKU-1 belongs to one of the deepest branching bacteria phyla, Thermotogota, but it is a member of a later branching clade within its genus Thermotoga. T. petrophila was first isolated from an oil reserve off the coast of Japan in 2001. This was the first time that this novel organism was morphologically and genetically described.

=== Morphological Characteristic ===
T. petrophila are rod shaped bacteria containing a sheath like structure that balloons at both ends called a toga. Typically, the cells size ranged from 2-7 μm long to 0.7-1.0 μm wide, and have flagella at the subpolar and lateral regions of the cell. The optimal growth rate occurs at 80 °C, but growth is observed from 47-88 °C. Growth occurs between pH 5.2-9.0 with optimum growth occurring at a pH 7. Ionic strength as well as oxygen availability affects the growth of T. petrophila negatively. It can grow and obtain carbon from the majority of sugars, excluding mannitol and xylose. While it cannot reduce sulfate to hydrogen sulfide, it reduces sulfur to thiosulfate which is further reduced to hydrogen sulfide.

=== Genotypic Characteristics ===
T. petrophila shares more than 99% of its 16S rRNA genetic sequence with its sister clade, T. maritima, T. neapolitana, and T. naphthophila, but each of these are distinct species as they share less than 30% similarity shown by DNA-DNA hybridization experiments. The G+C base content of the DNA is 46.6%. T. petrophila is also known to contain one of the smallest plasmids. Thermotoga petrophila RKU1 plasmid (pRKU1) is negatively supercoiled, contains 846 base pairs, and carries only the rep gene. Due to T. Petrophila being part of the deep branching bacterial lineages, some horizontal genetic transfer has occurred with the maltose transporter gene (mal3) and the archaeal lineage Thermococcales, while the mal1 and mal2 genes are more closely related to bacterial maltose transporter genes.

- Thermotoga
  - - Thermotoga maritima
    - Thermotoga neapolitana
  - - Thermotoga naphthophila
    - Thermotoga petrophila

== Metabolism ==
The majority of the Thermotogota species use the Embden–Meyerhof–Parnas pathway to catabolize glucose, however, during the tricarboxylic acid pathway,T. petrophila, uses the malic enzyme to create a pyruvate intermediate. They oxidatively catabolize malate to succinyl-CoA and reductively produce succinate from malate.

== Applications ==
Because these organisms are found near hyperthermophic deep sea oil rigs, their enzymes tend to be thermostable. Recently, the textile industry was investigating the fermentative scale up strategy of cloning the α – amylase gene from T. petrophila into E. coli. Their results indicate that the efficiency of this enzyme helps with the desizing of cotton cloth.

For the biofuel industry, cellulase enzyme genes from T. petrophila have been cloned and put into E. coli for an enhanced saccharification reaction from softwood dust. With nitric acid treatment and the transformed enzymes, the results revealed that lignin degradation was more efficiently optimized and that the recombinant cellulases actively hydrolyzed cellulose indicating that this method could potentially be used for better lignocellulosic based bioethanol manufacturing.

For medical purposes, T. petrophila K4 genetically engineered strain used its DNA polymerase (K4pol_{L329A}) for a detection method of acute respiratory syndrome-coronavirus 2 (SARS-CoV-2) detection kit.
