= Marinitoga piezophila =

Scientific classification
- Domain: Bacteria
- Kingdom: Thermotogati
- Phylum: Thermotogota
- Class: Thermotogae
- Order: Thermotogales
- Family: Thermotogaceae
- Genus: Marinitoga
- Species: M. piezophila

Binomial name
- Marinitoga piezophila Alain et al. 2002

Species of bacterium

Marinitoga piezophila is a species of rod-shaped, thermo-piezophilic bacteria. It is, anaerobic, chemo-organotrophic, sulfur-reducing, motile, have a mean length of 1-1.5 micrometres and stains Gram-negative. The type strain is KA3^{T} (= DSM 14283^{T} = JCM 11233^{T}).

== Origin ==
A thermophilic, anaerobic, piezophilic, chemo-organotrophic sulfur-reducing bacterium, designated as KA3T, was isolated from a deep-sea hydrothermal chimney sample collected at a depth of 2630 m on the East-Pacific Rise (13degree N).

== Optimal growth conditions ==
When grown under elevated hydrostatic pressure, the cells are rod-shaped with a sheath-like outer structure, motile, have a mean length of 1-1.5 mum and stain Gram-negative. They appear singly or in short chains. When grown at lower, or atmospheric, pressures, the cells elongate and become twisted. Growth is enhanced by hydrostatic pressure; the optimal pressure for growth is 40 MPa (26 MPa pressure at sampling site). The temperature range for growth is 45-70 degreeC, the optimum being around 65 degreeC (doubling time is approximately 20 min at 40 MPa). Growth is observed from pH 5 to pH 8, the optimum being at pH 6. The salinity range for growth is 10-50 g NaCl l-1, the optimum being at 30 g l-1

== Ecology ==
The isolate is able to grow on a broad spectrum of carbohydrates or complex proteinaceous substrates, and growth is stimulated by L-cystine and elemental sulfur. The G+C content of the genomic DNA is 29±1 mol%. According to phylogenetic analysis of the 16S rDNA gene, the strain is placed within the order Thermotogales, in the bacterial domain. On the basis of 16S rDNA sequence comparisons and morphological, physiological and genotypic characteristics, it is proposed that the isolate be described as a novel species of the genus Marinitoga, with Marinitoga piezophila sp. nov. as the type species
