= Fervidobacterium islandicum =

Scientific classification
- Domain: Bacteria
- Kingdom: Thermotogati
- Phylum: Thermotogota
- Class: Thermotogae
- Order: Thermotogales
- Family: Fervidobacteriaceae
- Genus: Fervidobacterium
- Species: F. islandicum

Binomial name
- Fervidobacterium islandicum Huber et al. 1991

Species of bacterium

Fervidobacterium islandicum is a species of extremely thermophilic anaerobic bacteria, first isolated from an Icelandic hot spring.

== Biology and biochemistry ==
=== Morphology ===
Fervidobacterium islandicum cells are Gram-negative motile rods, about 1.8 μm in length, and 0.6 μm in width occurring singly or in pairs. About 50% of cells form large spheroids at one end known as a 'toga' commonly found in members of the phylum Thermotogota (formerly Thermotogae)

=== Physiology ===
Fervidobacterium islandicum isolate H21 grows in a pH range from 6.0 to 8.0 with an optimum at around 7.2. Growth is observed at a temperature range between 40 °C and 80 °C, with an optimum of 70 °C. At a temperature of 65 °C, strain H21 has a doubling time of 150 minutes.

=== Culture growth ===
Growth of isolate H21 requires low amounts (0.3%) of yeast extract. When this is used as a single carbon and energy source, the final cell concentration is 1×10^{7} cells/ml. Growth is strongly enhanced by the addition of 0.2% pyruvate, ribose, glucose, maltose, raffinose, starch and, less efficiently, cellulose. Final cell concentrations with these additions can range from 2 to 5×10^{8}. In the presence of glucose, F. islandicum produces the following end products: L(+) lactate, acetate, ethanol, H_{2} and CO_{2}. Isolate H21 shows a sensitivity to common antibiotics, its growth is inhibited by addition of vancomycin, streptomycin, ampicillin, chloramphenicol and rifampicin at 10 $\mu$g/ml.

== Genomics ==
Fervidobacterium islandicum strain AW-1 has a total genome size of 2.4 million base pairs, which is slightly larger than the genomes of other Fervidobacterium strains. It has a G + C content of 40.7%. It contains 2,184 protein coding genes in a total of 2,248 genes.

== Environment ==
Fervidobacterium islandicum was originally isolated from an Icelandic hot spring on the banks of the river Varma close to Hverager$\eth$i, Iceland. The anaerobic samples were taken from hot waters and muds. Here, the temperatures were between 70 °C and 102 °C, and the pH was between 1.5 and 9.

== Biotechnological applications ==
Fervidobacterium islandicum AW-1 is capable of complete feather degradation at 70 °C and a pH of 7. Feather keratin has a very high cysteine content, which makes it very rigid and hard to digest. 5 million tons of chicken feathers are generated by the poultry industry every year, making chicken feathers a serious solid waste problem. Therefore, F. islandicum's ability to degrade native chicken feathers is very appealing.
