= Aminobacterium mobile =

Scientific classification
- Domain: Bacteria
- Kingdom: Thermotogati
- Phylum: Synergistota
- Class: Synergistia
- Order: Synergistales
- Family: Synergistaceae
- Genus: Aminobacterium
- Species: A. mobile

Binomial name
- Aminobacterium mobile Baena et al. 2000

Type strain
- ATCC BAA-7, DSM 12262, ILE-3

Synonyms
- Aminobacterium mobilis

Species of bacterium

Aminobacterium mobile is a Gram-negative, anaerobic, mesophilic, non-spore-forming and motile bacterium from the genus of Aminobacterium which has been isolated from anaerobic lagoon from a dairy wastewater treatment plant in Colombia. Dissimilar to Aminobacterium colombiense, Aminobacterium mobile has a marginally lower DNA GC-content (44 mol% vs 46 mol%.) Aminobacterium mobile is motile and ferments Serine to Acetate and Alanine. Aminobacterium mobile is both a Heterotroph and Asaccharolytic. Its adverse effects on both animals and humans are not yet known, but because of the ability of Aminobacterium mobile to degrade amino acids and peptides, the possibility of harmful effects cannot be excluded.
