= TM0436 =

Alcohol dehydrogenase (TM0436)

Identifiers
- Organism: Thermotoga maritima MSB8
- Symbol: TM0436
- Entrez: 897451
- PDB: 1VJ0
- RefSeq (Prot): NP_228246
- UniProt: Q9WYR7

Other data
- Chromosome: Thermotoga maritima MSB8 chromosome: 0.46 - 0.46 Mb
Search for
- Structures: Swiss-model
- Domains: InterPro

TM0436 is a putative zinc-binding alcohol dehydrogenase enzyme isolated from Thermotoga maritima. It contains both structural zinc sites and catalytic zinc sites, as well as a Rossmann fold to bind NADH-type ligands. It's a member of the MDR superfamily, which also contains class I mammalian ADH1.
