= Thermotoga subterranea =

Scientific classification
- Domain: Bacteria
- Kingdom: Thermotogati
- Phylum: Thermotogota
- Class: Thermotogae
- Order: Thermotogales
- Family: Thermotogaceae
- Genus: Thermotoga
- Species: T. subterranea

Binomial name
- Thermotoga subterranea Jeanthon et al. 2000

Species of bacterium

Thermotoga subterranea is a thermophilic, anaerobic, non-spore-forming, motile and Gram-negative bacterium, with type strain SL1.
