= Thermotoga neapolitana =

Scientific classification
- Domain: Bacteria
- Kingdom: Thermotogati
- Phylum: Thermotogota
- Class: Thermotogae
- Order: Thermotogales
- Family: Thermotogaceae
- Genus: Thermotoga
- Species: T. neapolitana

Binomial name
- Thermotoga neapolitana Huber et al., 1986

Species of bacterium

Thermotoga neapolitana is a hyperthermophilic organism that is a member of the order Thermotogales.

== Discovery ==
Thermotoga neapolitana was discovered in 1985 in Lucrino, Italy in a hotspring environment by Shimshon Belkin, Carl. O Wirsen, and Holger W. Jannasch of the University of California, Berkeley.

== Habitat and environmental conditions ==
Thermotoga neapolitana is considered thermophilic with a livable temperature range of 50–95 °C. The optimum temperature was found to be 77 °C, making it nearly hyperthermophilic. There is also evidence that it could be found in saline environments, due to its ability to thrive in moderately halophilic environments.

== Physical properties ==
Thermotoga neapolitana is a rod-shaped, Gram-negative bacterium. It is distinguishable by a thick periplasmic cell wall. Generally, they are found to be 0.2–5 μm, but they may reach sizes of up to 100 μm. It is non-sporulating - this along with its rod-shape and Gram-negative features are characteristic of the Order Thermotogales.

== Thermophilic adaptations ==
Using a guar-gum based medium, β-mannanase, β-mannosidase, α-galactosidase have been purified. These galactomannans are associated with allowing an organism to endure harsh environments (through stabilization of the membrane), such as high temperatures. These enzymes help provide simple saccharides to the organism. Polymers similar to those degraded by T. neopolitana are often used as storage polymers by plants. This may show that as the geothermal environments in which this organism is found have changed and biodiversified, so might the metabolism of this hyperthermophile.

== Growth and metabolic activity ==
Thermotoga neapolitana is strictly heterotrophic for its metabolic needs. It can also facultatively reduce elemental sulfur to hydrogen sulfide. In growth experiments, it was found to multiply rapidly with glucose and yeast abstract. After 24 hours of growth, the longest rods divide into two rods, most likely in response to decreases levels of glucose availability. Glucose, sucrose, lactose, and starch nutrients all support growth when used as a sole source of energy. Low level of growth occurred with exposure to only peptone or tryptone. Thermotoga neapolitana is unable to metabolize acetate, lactate, formate, pyruvate, propionate, mannitol, ethanol, methanol, glycerol, glutamate, or glycine. Chloramphenicol, vancomycin, streptomycin were all found to completely inhibit growth, though it was resistant to rifampin. Growth can be found within a 0.25-6% NaCl range exclusively, with no survival outside of this limit. It was originally thought to be strictly anaerobic, but can also survive under micro-aerophilic environments.

== Sulfur usage ==
Thermotoga neapolitana can facultatively reduce elemental sulfur to hydrogen sulfide. This allows for heightened reproductive rates of the organism - up to four-fold with elemental sulfur availability. This process requires the availability of a utilizable carbon source. Sulfuric acid and thiosulfate cannot be used for reduction. The presence of sulfide acts to inhibit growth of the organism. In a concentration of 10 mM, sulfide will inhibit growth by up to 95%.

== Hydrogen production ==
Thermotoga neapolitana shows promise as a useful bacterium due to its hydrogen production. It is capable of producing upwards of 25–30% hydrogen in the space it occupies when tested. The other notable gas it produces is carbon dioxide at a level of 12–15% of the total headspace. Despite different levels of hydrogen production under varying conditions, the hydrogen gas to carbon dioxide ratio is approximately 2:1. The hydrogen produced is considered extremely clean with a carbon monoxide level in the headspace of less than 50 parts per million. This may be promising from a bioengineering standpoint as hydrogen gas is commonly sought after as a possible alternative to fossil fuel burning for energy consumption. Though originally thought to be strictly anaerobic, Thermotoga neapolitana is more efficient in its catabolic pathways, especially its hydrogen production, when there are low levels of oxygen available (slightly above 10% total composition) in comparison to anoxic environments.

== Genomic properties ==
Thermotoga neapolitana shows a DNA base composition of 41.3% Guanine + Cytosine(and therefore 58.7% Adenine + Thymine). Using DNA-DNA hybridization, T. neapolitana was found to have a 74% homology with Thermotoga thermarum. T. neapolitana is also closely related to Thermotoga maritima, which was also discovered in geothermal environment. The ino1 gene is present in T. neapolitana. Most eukaryotes possess this gene, and it sometimes expressed to produce the rare osmolyte di-miyo-inositol 1,1' phosphate (DIP). This is linked to hyperthermilic tendencies because it protects the organism from high temperatures and salinities. The osmolyte may link T. neapolitana as well as other members of Thermotoga to Archaeans and Aquificales, the only other groups in which it is found.
