= Vogel–Johnson agar =

Selective culture medium

Vogel–Johnson agar is a type of agar growth medium selective for coagulase-positive staphylococci. It is used to isolate Staphylococcus aureus from clinical specimens and food. It was first described by Vogel and Johnson, who modified the Tellurite Glycine Agar recipe by Zebovitz et al. by doubling the mannitol concentration to 1% (w/v) and adding Phenol red as a pH indicator. It is widely available commercially.

== Typical composition ==
Vogel–Johnson agar typically contains:

- Tryptone - 10.0 g/L
- Yeast extract - 5.0 g/L
- Mannitol - 10.0 g/L
- Dipotassium phosphate - 5.0 g/L
- Lithium chloride - 5.0 g/L
- Glycine - 10.0 g/L
- Phenol red - 0.025 g/L
- Agar = 16.0 g/L

The Modified Vogel-Johnson Agar contains, in addition to above: 5 g/L of beef extract, 2 g/L of deoxyribonucleic acid, 2 /L g of phosphatidyl choline and 780 units/L of catalase spread on the plates before inoculation.
