= Acetomicrobium hydrogeniformans =

Scientific classification
- Domain: Bacteria
- Kingdom: Thermotogati
- Phylum: Synergistota
- Class: Synergistia
- Order: Synergistales
- Family: Synergistaceae
- Genus: Acetomicrobium
- Species: A. hydrogeniformans

Binomial name
- Acetomicrobium hydrogeniformans (Maune and Tanner 2012) Ben Hania et al. 2016

Type strain
- ATCC BAA-1850

Synonyms
- Anaerobaculum hydrogeniformans

Species of bacterium

Acetomicrobium hydrogeniformans is an anaerobic and moderately thermophilic bacterium from the genus of Acetomicrobium which has been isolated from oil production water from North Slope Borough in the United States.
