= Aminivibrio =

Scientific classification
- Domain: Bacteria
- Kingdom: Thermotogati
- Phylum: Synergistota
- Class: Synergistia
- Order: Synergistales
- Family: Synergistaceae
- Genus: Aminivibrio; Honda et al. 2013

Type species
- Aminivibrio pyruvatiphilus Honda et al. 2013

Species
- A. pyruvatiphilus

Genus of bacteria

Aminivibrio is a Gram-negative genus of bacteria from the family of Synergistaceae with one known species (Aminivibrio pyruvatiphilus). Aminivibrio pyruvatiphilus has been isolated from soil from a rice field.

== See also ==
- List of bacteria genera
- List of bacterial orders
