= Thermotoga hypogea =

Scientific classification
- Domain: Bacteria
- Kingdom: Thermotogati
- Phylum: Thermotogota
- Class: Thermotogae
- Order: Thermotogales
- Family: Thermotogaceae
- Genus: Thermotoga
- Species: T. hypogea

Binomial name
- Thermotoga hypogea Fardeau et al. 1997

Species of bacterium

Thermotoga hypogea is a hyperthermophilic organism that is a member of the order Thermotogales. It is thermophilic, xylanolytic, glucose-fermenting, strictly anaerobic and rod-shaped. The type strain of T. hypogea is SEBR 7054 (= DSM 11164).
