= Aminomonas paucivorans =

Scientific classification
- Domain: Bacteria
- Kingdom: Thermotogati
- Phylum: Synergistota
- Class: Synergistia
- Order: Synergistales
- Family: Synergistaceae
- Genus: Aminomonas
- Species: A. paucivorans

Binomial name
- Aminomonas paucivorans Baena et al., 1999

Species of anaerobic bacterium

Aminomonas paucivorans is a species of mesophilic, anaerobic, amino-acid-degrading bacterium. It was first formally described in 1999. It was specifically isolated from an anaerobic lagoon, which was part of a Dairy Wastewater Treatment plant. The anaerobic conditions of the lagoon, along with the presence of various organic compounds, provides an ideal environment for it to thrive.

== Characteristics ==
Aminomonas paucivorans is a Gram-negative, non-spore-forming bacterium that exhibits a slightly curved, rod-shaped morphology (0.3 × 4.0–6.0 μm) that exists singly or in pairs. This bacterium is classified as an obligate anaerobe, meaning that it requires environments devoid of oxygen for survival and growth. A. paucivorans is also asaccharolytic, utilizing amino acids such as arginine, histidine, threonine, and glycine, it grows best at around 35°C (95°F) and prefers a neutral pH of approximately pH of 7.5.

== Habitat ==
A. paucivorans thrives in an oxygen free environment, and was isolated from an anaerobic lagoon which was part of a dairy wastewater treatment plant.
