= Acetomicrobium flavidum =

Scientific classification
- Domain: Bacteria
- Kingdom: Thermotogati
- Phylum: Synergistota
- Class: Synergistia
- Order: Synergistales
- Family: Synergistaceae
- Genus: Acetomicrobium
- Species: A. flavidum

Binomial name
- Acetomicrobium flavidum (Soutschek et al. 1985)

Species of bacterium

Acetomicrobium flavidum is a thermophilic bacterium in the genus Acetomicrobium. It was first isolated from thermophilic, anaerobic sewage sludge digester operated at 60 °C (140 °F). The bacterium is gram negative and highly motile. The species represented around 25% of the microbial population in the sludge.
