= Fervidobacterium gondwanense =

Scientific classification
- Domain: Bacteria
- Kingdom: Thermotogati
- Phylum: Thermotogota
- Class: Thermotogae
- Order: Thermotogales
- Family: Fervidobacteriaceae
- Genus: Fervidobacterium
- Species: F. gondwanense

Binomial name
- Fervidobacterium gondwanense Andrews and Patel 1996
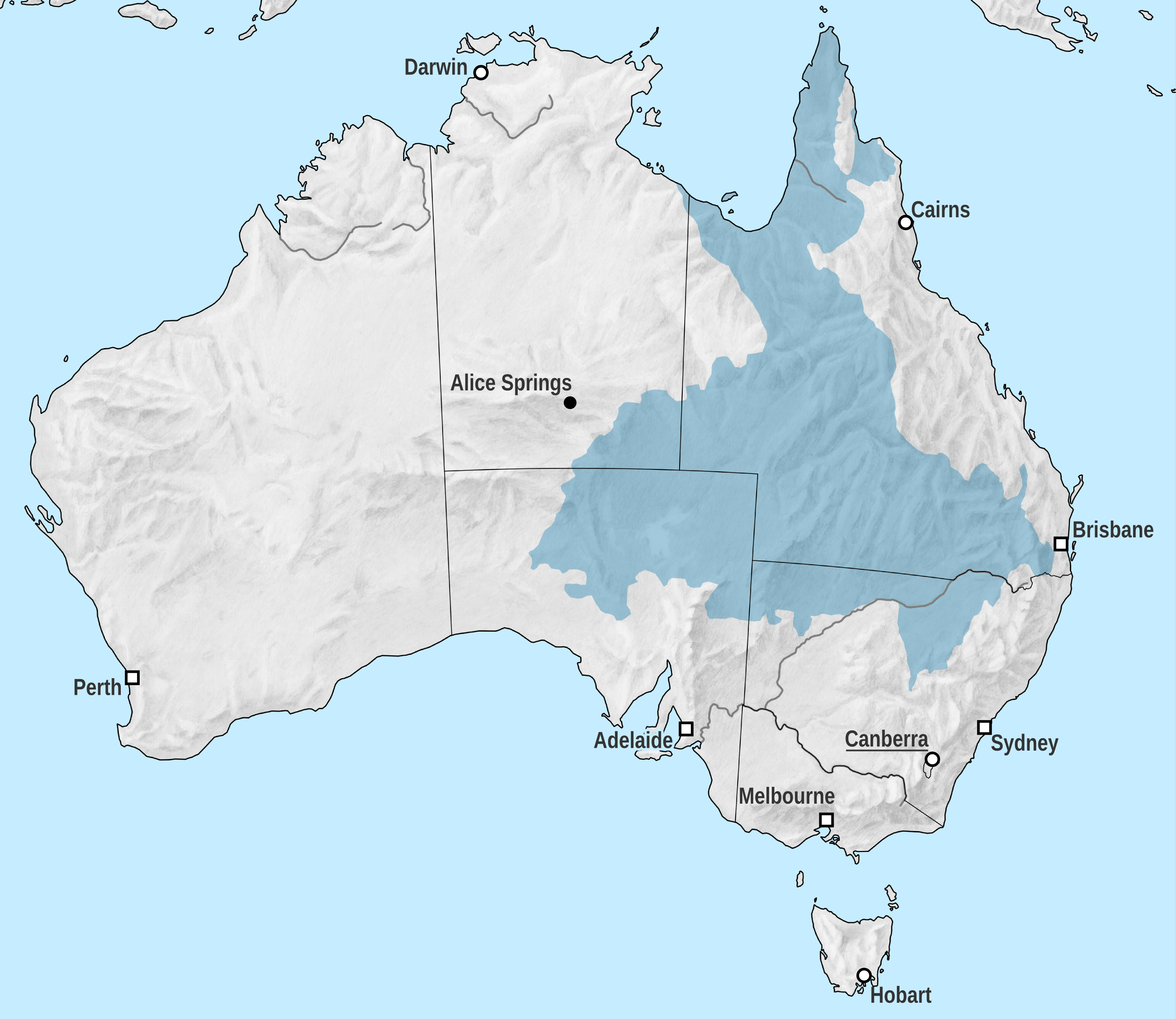
- This is a map of Australia with the light blue area showing the Great Artesian Basin region

Species of bacterium

Fervidobacterium gondwanense is a species of thermophilic anaerobic bacteria. It is non-sporulating, motile, gram-negative, and rod-shaped. F. godwanense was isolated in Great Artesian basin in Australia from non-volcanically heated geothermal waters.

Fervidobacterium godwanense grows best at temperatures from 65 °C to 68 °C and does not grow at all below 44 °Celsius. F. godwanense habitat are volcanic marine or terrestrial hotsprings. This species can also live in human-made places such as hot water storage tanks.
