= Fervidobacterium changbaicum =

Scientific classification
- Domain: Bacteria
- Kingdom: Thermotogati
- Phylum: Thermotogota
- Class: Thermotogae
- Order: Thermotogales
- Family: Fervidobacteriaceae
- Genus: Fervidobacterium
- Species: F. changbaicum

Binomial name
- Fervidobacterium changbaicum Cai et al. 2007

Species of bacterium

Fervidobacterium changbaicum is a species of thermophilic anaerobic bacteria first isolated from a hot spring in the Changbai Mountains. It is non-sporulating, motile, gram-negative, and rod-shaped. The type strain is CBS-1(T) (=DSM 17883(T) =JCM 13353(T)).
