= Aminobacterium thunnarium =

Scientific classification
- Domain: Bacteria
- Kingdom: Thermotogati
- Phylum: Synergistota
- Class: Synergistia
- Order: Synergistales
- Family: Synergistaceae
- Genus: Aminobacterium
- Species: A. thunnarium

Binomial name
- Aminobacterium thunnarium Hamdi et al. 2015

Type strain
- OTA 102, DSM 27500, JCM 19320

Species of bacterium

Aminobacterium thunnarium is a Gram-negative, anaerobic, mesophilic and non-spore-forming bacterium from the genus of Aminobacterium which has been isolated from sludge.
