= Acetomicrobium =

Scientific classification
- Domain: Bacteria
- Kingdom: Thermotogati
- Phylum: Synergistota
- Class: Synergistia
- Order: Synergistales
- Family: Synergistaceae
- Genus: Acetomicrobium; Soutschek et al. 1985

Type species
- Acetomicrobium flavidum Soutschek et al. 1985

Species
- A. flavidum; A. hydrogeniformans; A. mobile; A. thermoterrenum

Synonyms
- Anaerobaculum Rees et al. 1997

Genus of bacteria

Acetomicrobium is a genus in the phylum Synergistota (Bacteria). In 2016, the former genus Anaerobaculum was folded into Acetomicrobium.

== Etymology ==
The name Acetomicrobium derives from:
Latin noun acetum, vinegar; Neo-Latin neuter gender noun microbium (from Greek adjective mikros (μικρός), small and Greek noun bios (βίος), life), a microbe; Neo-Latin neuter gender noun Acetomicrobium, a microorganism producing acetic acid.

== Phylogeny ==
16S rRNA based LTP_10_2024

- Acetomicrobium
  - - A. flavidum Soutschek et al. 1985
    - A. mobile (Menes & Muxi 2002) Ben Hania et al. 2016
  - - A. hydrogeniformans (Maune & Tanner 2012) Ben Hania et al. 2016
    - A. thermoterrenum (Rees et al. 1997) Ben Hania et al. 2016

120 marker proteins based GTDB 10-RS226

- Acetomicrobium
  - A. flavidum (incl. A. mobile)
  - A. thermoterrenum (incl. A. hydrogeniformans)

== Species ==
The genus contains five species (including basonyms and synonyms), namely:

- A. faecale corrig. Winter et al. 1988 (Latin noun faex faecis, dregs, faeces; Latin neuter gender suff. -ale, suffix denoting pertaining to; Neo-Latin neuter gender adjective faecale, pertaining to faeces, fecal.)
- A. flavidum Soutschek et al. 1985 (Latin neuter gender adjective flavidum, yellowish.)
- A. hydrogeniformans (Maune & Tanner 2012) Ben Hania et al. 2016
- A. mobile (Menes & Muxi 2002) Ben Hania et al. 2016
- A. thermoterrenum (Rees et al. 1997) Ben Hania et al. 2016

== See also ==
- List of bacterial orders
- List of bacteria genera
- Bacterial taxonomy
- Microbiology
