= Thermotoga elfii =

Scientific classification
- Domain: Bacteria
- Kingdom: Thermotogati
- Phylum: Thermotogota
- Class: Thermotogae
- Order: Thermotogales
- Family: Thermotogaceae
- Genus: Thermotoga
- Species: T. elfii

Binomial name
- Thermotoga elfii Ravot et al. 1995

Species of bacterium

Thermotoga elfii is a rod-shaped, glucose-fermenting bacterium. The type strain of T. elfii is SEBR 6459^{T}. The genus Thermotoga was originally thought to be strictly found surrounding submarine hydrothermal vents, but this organism was subsequently isolated in African oil wells in 1995. A protective outer sheath allows this microbe to be thermophilic. This organism cannot function in the presence of oxygen making it strictly anaerobic. Some research proposes that the thiosulfate-reducing qualities in this organism could lead to decreased bio-corrosion in oil equipment in industrial settings.

== History ==
=== Discovery ===
The genus Thermotoga, previously thought only to be found around submarine hydrothermal vents, was discovered in North Sea oil wells. Due to this discovery, other wells in the area began being investigated, leading to the discovery of Thermotoga elfii in African oil wells in April 1995. T. elfii was gathered in a one-liter sample at the head of a well at 68 °C. Ravot et al. isolated this species by cultivation on a basal medium containing numerous different nutrients and resources (water, salt, glucose, sodium acetate, etc.) in the lab and then by using repeated trials of the agar shake dilution technique. These scientists concluded by determining the samples' purity through microscopy.

=== Taxonomy ===
The first name of Thermotoga elfii is derived from the Greek root "therm," which means heat. "Toga," which is a Roman term for an outer garment, is where the second part of the genus name originated. This is due to the outer sheath that wraps around the bacteria to protect it from the extreme temperature often associated with this thermophile. The latter name is derived from Elf-Aquitaine, the French oil company that owned the oil wells where T. elfii was first discovered.

== Physiology and metabolism ==
Therotoga elfii colonies of 1 millimeter have been observed in a laboratory setting, but the actual structure of the rod-shaped T. elfii is between 0.5-3 micrometers long. Its protective outer sheath is the defining characteristic, which aided in providing T. elfii its name. This structure balloons over each side of the organism and protects it from extreme heat. When a Gram stain is performed on this organism, a gram-negative result is expected. T. elfii has flagella uniformly distributed around its body, making it a peritrichous bacteria. It is also an obligate anaerobe, meaning it cannot tolerate oxygen. Electron acceptors include thiosulfate, arabinose, bio-trypticase, fructose, glucose, lactose, maltose, ribose, sucrose, and xylose. Electron donors include acetate, carbon dioxide, and hydrogen.

== Genome and phylogeny ==
The 16s RNA gene is 1,519 bases long with a GC content of 39.6 mol%. Due to T. elfii’s relatively new status, much information about the number of genes is still unknown. However, a 91.9% relative of this species, Thermotoga maritima, has been documented as having 1.86 million base pairs with 1,877 predicted coding regions. The phylogenic family for Thermotoga elfii contains organisms such as Thermotoga thermarum, Thermotoga maritima, and Thermosipho africanus, which have a roughly 90% relation to this organism.

== Ecology ==
The genus Thermotoga contains some of the most thermophilic microorganisms known. It is composed of species that are thermophilic and hyperthermophilic which can thrive in temperatures as high as 80 °C. The optimum growth temperature for Thermotoga elfii, however, is 66 °C. The optimum pH is 7.5 and the optimum salinity is 1.2%.

== Applications ==
=== Industrial applications ===
The discovery of T. elfii has been deemed significant as it has led to other discoveries of methanogens, thermophiles, and sulfate-reducing bacteria. This organism and the others discovered in this unique environment can help make progress in microbe-assisted oil recovery processes. Thiosulfate, often implicated in the corrosion of metals used in oil pipelines, is reduced to sulfide by Thermotoga elfii, which leads many scientists to believe it has a major role in preserving oil extraction equipment.

=== Environmental applications ===
In many anoxic thermal marine hot springs, thiosulfate oxidation often does not occur or occurs at an extremely slow rate. These thermophilic thiosulfate-reducers can play a key role in the mineralization of organic compounds to simpler, plant-accessible forms.
