= Jonathan Birch (philosopher) =

British philosopher

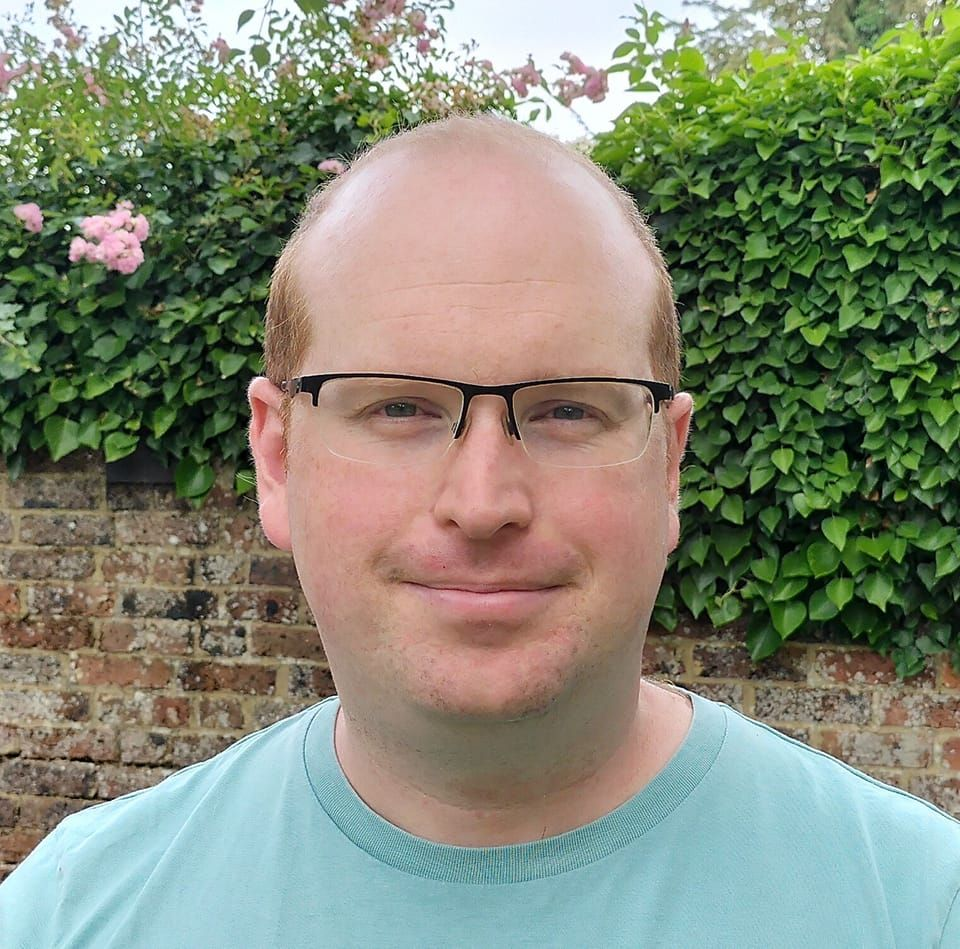
- Birch in 2023
- Education: University of Cambridge (BA, MPhil, DPhil)
- Organization: London School of Economics
- Website: personal.lse.ac.uk/birchj1/

Jonathan Birch is a British philosopher. He is professor of philosophy at the London School of Economics and Political Science. Birch's work addresses the philosophy of biology and behavioural sciences, especially questions concerning sentience, bioethics, animal welfare, and the evolution of social behaviour and social norms.

In 2017, he published the book The Philosophy of Social Evolution, which explores social behaviour in everything from microorganisms to humans and higher primates. In 2021, he was the Principal Investigator of a review that led the UK to recognize cephalopods and decapod crustaceans as sentient. In 2024, he published the book The Edge of Sentience, which examines the concept of sentience, whether artificial intelligence or animals like insects may be sentient, and how to handle the uncertainty.

== Education ==
Birch read for a Bachelor of Arts with honours in Natural Sciences at the University of Cambridge from 2005 to 2008, and then an MPhil in History and Philosophy of Science at Cambridge from 2008 to 2009. He read for a PhD in History and Philosophy of Science at Cambridge from 2009 to 2013. His thesis, which was supervised by Tim Lewens, was entitled Kin Selection: A Philosophical Analysis.

== Career ==
Birch's 2021 Review of the Evidence of Sentience in Cephalopod Molluscs and Decapod Crustaceans led the UK to recognize cephalopod molluscs and decapod crustaceans as sentient.

From 2012 to 2014, Birch held a Junior Research Fellowship at Christ's College, Cambridge. He was awarded a Philip Leverhulme Prize in 2014, the same year he took up an Assistant Professorship at the Department of Philosophy Logic and Scientific Method at the London School of Economics and Political Science (LSE) in 2014. In 2017, he published his first monograph, The Philosophy of Social Evolution, with Oxford University Press. The book explores the philosophical foundations of social evolution theory, as founded by W. D. Hamilton, including Hamilton's rule, kin selection, and inclusive fitness. Birch makes the case that social evolution theory offers potential for furthering understanding of a range of areas of evolutionary science, including microbial evolution and human evolution, as well as in diverse studies of cooperation. In 2018, Birch was promoted to Associate Professor. From 2020, Birch was the principal investigator for the five-year Foundations of Animal Sentience (ASENT) research project at LSE, which was funded by the European Research Council. Responding to controversies around the nature and attribution of animal sentience, the project seeks to develop "a conceptual framework for thinking about sentience as an evolved phenomenon that varies along several dimensions, a deeper understanding of how these dimensions of sentience relate to measurable aspects of animal behaviour and the nervous system, and a richer picture of the links between sentience, welfare and the ethical status of animals".

Birch was the lead author of a report entitled Review of the Evidence of Sentience in Cephalopod Molluscs and Decapod Crustaceans for the Department for Environment, Food and Rural Affairs, published in 2021. The report recommended that cephalopods and decapod crustaceans should be considered sentient under the Animal Welfare Act 2006 and other UK laws. The Animal Welfare (Sentience) Act 2022, when initially drafted in 2021, recognised only vertebrates as sentient. In response to Birch's report, however, the Act was amended to include cephalopods and decapods. In 2023, Birch was promoted to Professor.

In March 2024, Birch was appointed to the Animals in Science Committee. Later that year, along with Jeff Sebo and Kristin Andrews, he launched the New York Declaration on Animal Consciousness. The declaration affirms that "there is strong scientific support for attributions of conscious experience to other mammals and to birds"; that "the empirical evidence indicates at least a realistic possibility of conscious experience in all vertebrates (including reptiles, amphibians, and fishes) and many invertebrates (including, at minimum, cephalopod mollusks, decapod crustaceans, and insects)", and that "when there is a realistic possibility of conscious experience in an animal, it is irresponsible to ignore that possibility in decisions affecting that animal". Birch was in Vox's 2024 "Future Perfect 50", a list highlighting individuals contributing to a better future.

Birch's second book, The Edge of Sentience: Risk and Precaution in Humans, Other Animals, and AI, was released in open access in July 2024 by Oxford University Press. The book examines topics such as the mind-body problem, which entities can be considered sentience candidates, (Note: According to Birch, "A system S is a sentience candidate if there is an evidence base that (a) implies a realistic possibility of sentience in S that it would be irresponsible to ignore when making policy decisions that will affect S, and (b) is rich enough to allow the identification of welfare risks and the design and assessment of precautions.") how to handle uncertainty, reasonable precautions, policy proposals, and distinctive challenges in the case of AI. The book won The Royal Institute of Philosophy's 2025 Nayef Al-Rodhan Book Prize.

In March 2025 the London School of Economics announced the creation of the Jeremy Coller Centre for Animal Sentience, supported by a £4 million donation from the Jeremy Coller Foundation. The Centre launched in autumn 2025 under Birch's directorship, aiming to bring together interdisciplinary expertise to advance the scientific study of animal feelings and their policy implications. Its agenda includes developing guidance for policymakers and NGOs, advising on behavioural change and the abolition of inhumane practices, and exploring ethical applications of artificial intelligence in relation to animals.

== Selected publications ==
- Birch, Jonathan; Okasha, Samir (2014). "Kin selection and its critics". BioScience. 65 (2): 22–32. doi:10.1093/biosci/biu196. hdl:1983/ef534f77-1a96-44a6-ba77-7eb03037ddc4.
- Birch, Jonathan (2017). "Animal sentience and the precautionary principle". Animal Sentience. 16 (1). doi:10.51291/2377-7478.1200. S2CID 37538020.
- Birch, Jonathan (2017). "The inclusive fitness controversy: Finding a way forward". Royal Society Open Science. 4 (7) 170335. Bibcode:2017RSOS....470335B. doi:10.1098/rsos.170335. PMC 5541557. PMID 28791162.
- Birch, Jonathan; Schnell, Alexandra K.; Clayton, Nicola S. (2020). "Dimensions of animal consciousness". Trends in Cognitive Sciences. 24 (10): 789–801. doi:10.1016/j.tics.2020.07.007. PMC 7116194. PMID 32830051.
- Birch, Jonathan (2017). The Philosophy of Social Evolution. Vol. 1. Oxford: Oxford University Press. doi:10.1093/oso/9780198733058.001.0001. ISBN 978-0-19-873305-8.
- Birch, Jonathan; Burn, Charlotte; Schnell, Alexandra; Browning, Heather; Crump, Andrew (November 2021). Review of the Evidence of Sentience in Cephalopod Molluscs and Decapod Crustaceans (Report). London School of Economics.
- Browning, Heather; Birch, Jonathan (2022). "Animal sentience". Philosophy Compass. 17 (5) e12822. doi:10.1111/phc3.12822. PMC 9285591. PMID 35859762.
- Birch, Jonathan (19 July 2024). The Edge of Sentience: Risk and Precaution in Humans, Other Animals, and AI. Oxford University Press. doi:10.1093/9780191966729.001.0001. ISBN 978-0-19-287042-1.
