= 2-FA =

- 2-Fluoroamphetamine
- 2-Fluoroadenine
