= Lactivibrio =

Scientific classification
- Domain: Bacteria
- Kingdom: Thermotogati
- Phylum: Synergistota
- Class: Synergistia
- Order: Synergistales
- Family: Synergistaceae
- Genus: Lactivibrio; Qiu et al. 2014

Type species
- Lactivibrio alcoholicus Qiu et al. 2014

Species
- L. alcoholicus

Genus of bacteria

Lactivibrio is a genus of bacteria from the family of Synergistaceae with one known species (Lactivibrio alcoholicus). Lactivibrio alcoholicus has been isolated from mesophilic granular sludge from Tokyo in Japan.

== See also ==
- List of bacteria genera
- List of bacterial orders
