= Acetoacetyl-CoA hydrolase =

Class of enzymes

Identifiers
- EC no.: 3.1.2.11
- CAS no.: 37288-10-1

Databases
- BRENDA: enzyme data
- ExPASy: NiceZyme view
- KEGG: enzyme entry
- MetaCyc: metabolic pathway
- Rhea: reactions
- PDB structures: RCSB PDB PDBe PDBsum
- Gene Ontology: AmiGO / QuickGO
Search
- PMC: articles
- PubMed: articles
- NCBI: proteins

The enzyme acetoacetyl-CoA hydrolase (EC 3.1.2.11) catalyzes the reaction

acetoacetyl-CoA
H_{2}O
coenzyme A
+
acetoacetic acid

The enzyme characterised from liver hydrolyses acetoacetyl-CoA to coenzyme A and acetoacetic acid, which forms the thioester in the starting material. The enzyme from Thermosipho melanesiensis has been studied as a means of producing acetone by metabolic engineering.

This is a hydrolase, specifically one acting on thioester bonds. The systematic name is acetoacetyl-CoA hydrolase. Other names in common use include acetoacetyl coenzyme A hydrolase, acetoacetyl CoA deacylase, and acetoacetyl coenzyme A deacylase.
