= Thermanaerovibrio acidaminovorans =

Scientific classification
- Domain: Bacteria
- Kingdom: Thermotogati
- Phylum: Synergistota
- Class: Synergistia
- Order: Synergistales
- Family: Synergistaceae
- Genus: Thermanaerovibrio
- Species: T. acidaminovorans

Binomial name
- Thermanaerovibrio acidaminovorans (Guangsheng et al. 1997) Baena et al. 1999

Type strain
- ATCC 49978, DSM 6589, Su883

Synonyms
- Selenomonas acidaminovorans Thermoanaerovibrio acidaminovorans

Species of bacterium

Thermanaerovibrio acidaminovorans is a moderately thermophilic and anaerobic bacterium from the genus of Thermanaerovibrio which has been isolated from granular methanogenic sludge from Breda in the Netherlands.

== Uses ==
Strain SU883^{t} is of interest because how it can ferment a couple of amino acids, and because of its metabolism greatly enhanced in the presence of Methanobacterium thermoautotrophicum
