= Thermanaerovibrio velox =

Scientific classification
- Domain: Bacteria
- Kingdom: Thermotogati
- Phylum: Synergistota
- Class: Synergistia
- Order: Synergistales
- Family: Synergistaceae
- Genus: Thermanaerovibrio
- Species: T. velox

Binomial name
- Thermanaerovibrio velox Zavarzina et al. 2000

Type strain
- DSM 12556, Z-9701

Synonyms
- Thermosinus velox

Species of bacterium

Thermanaerovibrio velox is a Gram-negative, moderately thermophilic, organotrophic and anaerobic bacterium from the genus of Thermanaerovibrio which has been isolated from cyanobacterial mat from Uzon caldera in Russia.
