= Cloacibacillus =

Scientific classification
- Domain: Bacteria
- Kingdom: Thermotogati
- Phylum: Synergistota
- Class: Synergistia
- Order: Synergistales
- Family: Synergistaceae
- Genus: Cloacibacillus; Ganesan et al. 2008

Type species
- Cloacibacillus evryensis Ganesan et al. 2008

Species
- C. evryensis; C. porcorum

Genus of bacteria

Cloacibacillus is a Gram-negative and anaerobic genus of bacteria from the family Synergistaceae. Cloacibacillus bacteria are pathogenic.
