= Dethiosulfovibrio peptidovorans =

Scientific classification
- Domain: Bacteria
- Kingdom: Thermotogati
- Phylum: Synergistota
- Class: Synergistia
- Order: Synergistales
- Family: Dethiosulfovibrionaceae
- Genus: Dethiosulfovibrio
- Species: D. peptidovorans

Binomial name
- Dethiosulfovibrio peptidovorans Magot et al. 1997

Species of bacterium

Dethiosulfovibrio peptidovorans is an anaerobic, slightly halophilic, thiosulfate-reducing bacterium. Its genome has been sequenced. It is vibrio-shaped (3-5 by 1 μm), gram-negative and possesses lateral flagella. It is non-spore-forming. Its type strain is SEBR 4207^{T}.
