= Aminobacterium colombiense =

Scientific classification
- Domain: Bacteria
- Kingdom: Thermotogati
- Phylum: Synergistota
- Class: Synergistia
- Order: Synergistales
- Family: Synergistaceae
- Genus: Aminobacterium
- Species: A. colombiense

Binomial name
- Aminobacterium colombiense Baena et al. 1999

Type strain
- ALA-1, DSM 12261

Species of bacterium

Aminobacterium colombiense is a Gram-negative, mesophilic, strictly anaerobic and non-spore-forming bacterium from the genus of Aminobacterium which has been isolated from anaerobic lagoon from a dairy wastewater treatment plant in Colombia.

== Further Information ==
1. Complete genome sequence of Aminobacterium colombiense type strain (ALA-1^{T})
2. Proteomes - Aminobacterium colombiense (strain DSM 12261 / ALA-1)
