= The Edge of Sentience =

2024 book by Jonathan Birch

- First edition cover
- Author: Jonathan Birch
- Illustrator: Anna Zeligowski (cover)
- Language: English
- Subjects: Sentience; ethics
- Publisher: Oxford University Press
- Publication date: 19 July 2024
- Publication place: United Kingdom
- Media type: Ebook
- Pages: 384
- ISBN: 978-0-19-287042-1
- OCLC: 1445898741
- Text: The Edge of Sentience online
- Website: edgeofsentience.com

The Edge of Sentience: Risk and Precaution in Humans, Other Animals, and AI is a 2024 book by the British philosopher Jonathan Birch, published by Oxford University Press. The book examines ethical and policy questions arising from uncertainty about sentience, which Birch defines as the capacity for valenced experiences, such as pain and pleasure. Birch argues for a precautionary approach to moral and policy decisions when there is a realistic possibility that a being is sentient.

The book introduces the concept of a "sentience candidate" for systems that may plausibly be sentient. Birch discusses examples including people with disorders of consciousness, human fetuses, brain organoids, cephalopods, crustaceans, and artificial intelligence systems. He argues that policy should focus on avoiding suffering and should use proportional precautions informed by democratic deliberation.

The Edge of Sentience has been reviewed in publications including 3 Quarks Daily, Leonardo, and Biosemiotics. Reviewers discussed its use of precautionary reasoning, its treatment of uncertain sentience, and its relation to public policy. The book was launched at events hosted by New York University and the London School of Economics.

== Background ==
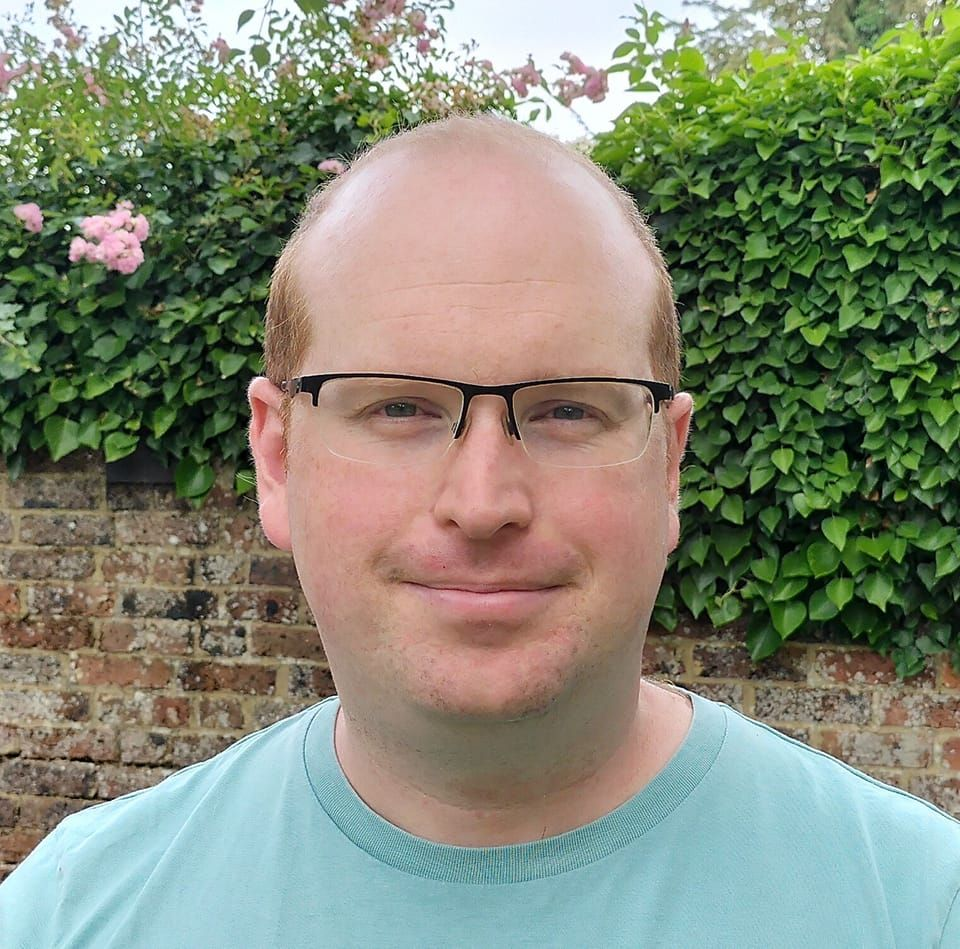
Birch in 2023

Jonathan Birch is a professor of philosophy at the London School of Economics and principal investigator of the Foundations of Animal Sentience project. In 2021, he chaired a government-commissioned review of scientific evidence on sentience in cephalopod molluscs and decapod crustaceans. The review's findings informed the United Kingdom's decision to extend legal recognition of sentience to some invertebrates, including octopuses, crabs, and lobsters, through the Animal Welfare (Sentience) Act 2022.

Birch wrote The Edge of Sentience to discuss ethical and policy questions that arise when assessing whether beings such as invertebrates, brain organoids, or AI systems are sentient. These cases are described as being at the "edge of sentience". The book focuses on how policymakers can act under uncertainty about sentience, with attention to practical reasoning and proportional precaution rather than speculative theories of consciousness.

== Publication history ==
The book was first published online as an open access title by Oxford University Press on 19 July 2024. Its cover was illustrated by Anna Zeligowski. A hardback version was released on 15 August 2024. An audiobook version, narrated by Graham Mack, was published by HighBridge Audio on 18 February 2025.

== Summary ==
The Edge of Sentience sets out a framework for ethical decision-making when the presence of sentience is uncertain. Birch defines sentience as the capacity for valenced experience, meaning experiences that feel pleasant or unpleasant to the subject. He distinguishes sentience from broader concepts of consciousness and intelligence, and argues that sentience is sufficient for moral consideration.

The book examines cases in which sentience is uncertain, including people with disorders of consciousness, human fetuses, brain organoids, non-human animals such as cephalopods and crustaceans, and artificial intelligence systems. Birch discusses how precautionary reasoning can inform ethical and policy responses in these cases.

Birch uses the term "sentience candidate" for a system where there is a credible, non-negligible possibility of sentience. He argues that, when such a possibility exists, potential suffering should not be ignored. His framework is based on three principles: a duty to avoid gratuitous suffering, the moral relevance of sentience candidature, and the use of democratic deliberation in deciding appropriate precautions.

The book applies this framework to areas including medical ethics, research on organoids and fetuses, invertebrate welfare in animal farming, and the regulation of artificial intelligence. Birch argues that policy should be guided by precaution and proportionality rather than certainty, especially where the risk of suffering is serious or irreversible.

Rather than attempting to resolve the philosophical problem of other minds, Birch focuses on action under uncertainty. He argues that, even if the boundaries of sentience remain uncertain, ethical decisions can still be guided by precaution, proportionality, and public accountability.

== Reception ==
In 3 Quarks Daily, Mike O'Brien described The Edge of Sentience as a clear and policy-oriented contribution to public philosophy. He wrote that Birch develops a systematic framework for uncertainty about sentience in humans, animals, and artificial intelligence, based on duties to prevent suffering and to support democratic decision-making. O'Brien noted the book's focus on practical reasoning and its avoidance of speculative claims. He questioned whether democratic consultation is always the best means of representing non-human interests, but regarded Birch's position as workable within existing institutions.

In Leonardo, Gregory Tague discussed the book's treatment of ethical and policy issues concerning sentience in humans, animals, and artificial intelligence. He noted Birch's emphasis on caution and public involvement when evidence of sentience is uncertain, and described the book as accessible and relevant to debates in animal ethics and AI ethics. Tague called for further discussion of how precautionary principles can guide policy in emerging scientific fields.

Writing in Biosemiotics, Claudio Julio Rodríguez Higuera discussed the book's relevance to research on sentience and ethics in policy. He wrote that, although Birch does not directly address biosemiotics, its perspectives on communication and value in non-human organisms could complement Birch's framework. Rodríguez Higuera suggested that the book's policy-oriented ethics could contribute to exchanges between biosemiotics and philosophy of mind.

== Public engagement ==
A book launch event was held at Lipton Hall, NYU School of Law, on 11 November 2024. Birch also gave a public lecture at the London School of Economics on 3 December 2024. The event, titled The Edge of Sentience: Risk and Precaution in Humans, Other Animals, and AI, discussed arguments from the book and their implications for ethics and public policy.

== See also ==
- Animal consciousness
- Artificial consciousness
- Ethics of artificial intelligence
- Ethics of uncertain sentience
- Moral circle expansion
- Pain in animals
- Sentientism
- Speciesism
