= Aminiphilus =

Scientific classification
- Domain: Bacteria
- Kingdom: Thermotogati
- Phylum: Synergistota
- Class: Synergistia
- Order: Synergistales
- Family: Synergistaceae
- Genus: Aminiphilus; Díaz et al. 2007

Type species
- Aminiphilus circumscriptus Diaz et al. 2007

Species
- A. circumscriptus

Genus of bacteria

Aminiphilus is a Gram-negative, non-spore-forming and motile genus of bacteria from the family of Synergistaceae with one known species (Aminiphilus circumscriptus). Aminiphilus circumscriptus has been isolated from anaerobic sludge from Colombia.

== See also ==
- List of bacteria genera
- List of bacterial orders
