= Thermovirga =

Scientific classification
- Domain: Bacteria
- Kingdom: Thermotogati
- Phylum: Synergistota
- Class: Synergistia
- Order: Synergistales
- Family: Synergistaceae
- Genus: Thermovirga; Dahle and Birkeland 2006

Type species
- Thermovirga lienii Dahle & Birkeland 2006

Species
- T. lienii

Genus of bacteria

Thermovirga is a Gram-negative, anaerobic and motile genus of bacteria from the family of Synergistaceae with one known species (Thermovirga lienii). Thermovirga lienii has been isolated from production water from an oil well from the North Sea in Norway.

== See also ==
- List of bacteria genera
- List of bacterial orders
