= URA3 =

Orotidine 5'-phosphate decarboxylase

Identifiers
- Organism: Saccharomyces cerevisiae
- Symbol: URA3
- Alt. symbols: YEL021W, ODCase
- Entrez: 856692
- HomoloGene: 136914
- RefSeq (mRNA): NM_001178836
- RefSeq (Prot): NP_010893
- UniProt: P03962

Other data
- EC number: 4.1.1.23
- Chromosome: V: 0.12 - 0.12 Mb
Search for
- Structures: Swiss-model
- Domains: InterPro

URA3 is a gene on chromosome V in Saccharomyces cerevisiae (yeast). Its systematic name is YEL021W. URA3 is often used in yeast research as a "marker gene", that is, a gene to label chromosomes or plasmids. URA3 encodes Orotidine 5'-phosphate decarboxylase (ODCase), which is an enzyme that catalyzes one reaction in the synthesis of pyrimidine ribonucleotides (a component of RNA).

== Use in yeast research ==
Loss of ODCase activity leads to a lack of cell growth unless uracil or uridine is added to the media. The presence of the URA3 gene in yeast restores ODCase activity, facilitating growth on media not supplemented with uracil or uridine, thereby allowing selection for yeast carrying the gene. In contrast, if 5-FOA (5-Fluoroorotic acid) is added to the media, the active ODCase will convert 5-FOA into the toxic compound (a suicide inhibitor) 5-fluorouracil causing cell death, which allows for selection against yeast carrying the gene.

Since URA3 allows for both positive and negative selection, it has been developed as a genetic marker for DNA transformations and other genetic techniques in bacteria and many fungal species. It is one of the most important genetic markers in yeast genetic modification. While URA3 is a powerful selectable marker, it has a high background. This background is because cells that pick up mutations in URA3 may also grow on 5-FOA. Colonies should be verified by a second assay such as PCR to confirm the desired strain has been created.
