= Fretibacterium =

Scientific classification
- Domain: Bacteria
- Kingdom: Thermotogati
- Phylum: Synergistota
- Class: Synergistia
- Order: Synergistales
- Family: Synergistaceae
- Genus: Fretibacterium; Vartoukian et al. 2013

Type species
- Fretibacterium fastidiosum Vartoukian et al. 2013

Species
- F. fastidiosum

Genus of bacteria

Fretibacterium is a genus of bacteria from the family of Synergistaceae with one known species (Fretibacterium fastidiosum). Fretibacterium fastidiosum has been isolated from subgingival plaque.

== See also ==
- List of bacteria genera
- List of bacterial orders
