= Synergistes jonesii =

Scientific classification
- Domain: Bacteria
- Kingdom: Thermotogati
- Phylum: Synergistota
- Class: Synergistia
- Order: Synergistales
- Family: Synergistaceae
- Genus: Synergistes; Allison et al. 1993
- Species: S. jonesii

Binomial name
- Synergistes jonesii Allison et al. 1993

Species of bacterium

Synergistes jonesii is a species of bacteria, the type species of its genus. It is a rumen bacterium that degrades toxic pyridinediols including mimosine. It is obligately anaerobic, gram-negative and rod-shaped. It was discovered in 1981 by Raymond J. Jones in Hawaii and Jones' hypothesis was proven in 1986 by himself and R. G. Megarrity.
