= Synergistota =

Scientific classification
- Domain: Bacteria
- Kingdom: Thermotogati
- Phylum: Synergistota; Jumas-Bilak et al. 2009
- Class: Synergistia; Jumas-Bilak et al. 2009
- Order: Synergistales; Jumas-Bilak et al. 2009

Families
- Acetomicrobiaceae; Aminiphilaceae; Aminithiophilaceae; Aminobacteriaceae; Dethiosulfovibrionaceae; Synergistaceae; Thermosynergistaceae; Thermovirgaceae

Synonyms
- "Synergistaeota" Oren et al. 2015; "Synergistetes" Jumas-Bilak et al. 2009; "Synergistota" Whitman et al. 2018

Phylum of bacteria

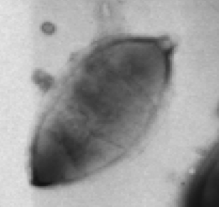
Electron microscopy image of a member bacterium belonging to the phylum Synergistetes

The Synergistota is a phylum of anaerobic bacteria that show Gram-negative staining and have rod/vibrioid cell shape. Although Synergistota have a diderm cell envelope, the genes for various proteins involved in lipopolysaccharides biosynthesis have not yet been detected in Synergistota, indicating that they may have an atypical outer cell envelope. The Synergistota inhabit a majority of anaerobic environments including animal gastrointestinal tracts, soil, oil wells, and wastewater treatment plants and they are also present in sites of human diseases such as cysts, abscesses, and areas of periodontal disease. Due to their presence at illness related sites, the Synergistota are suggested to be opportunistic pathogens but they can also be found in healthy individuals in the microbiome of the umbilicus and in normal vaginal flora. Species within this phylum have also been implicated in periodontal disease, gastrointestinal infections and soft tissue infections. Other species from this phylum have been identified as significant contributors in the degradation of sludge for production of biogas in anaerobic digesters and are potential candidates for use in renewable energy production through their production of hydrogen gas. All of the known Synergistota species and genera are presently part of a single class (Synergistia), order (Synergistiales), and family (Synergistaceae).

== Comparative genomics and molecular signatures ==
Recent comparative analyses of sequenced Synergistota genomes have led to identification of large numbers of conserved signature indels (CSIs) in protein sequences that are specific for either all sequenced Synergistota species or some of their sub-clades that are observed in phylogenetic trees. Of the CSIs that were identified, 32 in widely distributed proteins such as RpoB, RpoC, UvrD, GyrA, PolA, PolC, MraW, NadD, PyrE, RpsA, RpsH, FtsA, RadA, etc., including a large >300 aa insert in the RpoC protein, are present in various Synergistota species, but except for isolated bacteria, these CSIs are not found in the protein homologues from all other organisms. These CSIs provide novel molecular markers for distinguishing Synergistota species from all other bacteria. Seven other CSIs in important proteins including a 13 aa in RpoB were found to be uniquely present in Jonquetella, Pyramidobacter and Dethiosulfovibrio species indicating a close and specific relationship among these bacteria, which is also strongly supported by phylogenetic trees. Fifteen addition CSIs that were only present in Jonquetella and Pyramidobacter indicate a close association between these two species. Lastly, a close relationship between the Aminomonas and Thermanaerovibrio species is also supported by 9 identified CSIs. The identified molecular markers provide reliable means for the division of species from the phylum Synergistota into intermediate taxonomic ranks such as families and orders.

== Phylogeny ==
16S rRNA based LTP_10_2024

- Synergistota
  - - - Aminithiophilaceae
        Aminithiophilus ramosus Pradel et al. 2023
    - - - - Thermovirgaceae
            Thermovirga lienii Dahle and Birkeland 2006
        - - Thermosynergistaceae
            Thermosynergistes pyruvativorans Yang et al. 2021
          - Acetomicrobaceae
            - Acetomicrobium
              - - A. flavidum Soutschek et al. 1985
                - A. mobile (Menes & Muxi 2002) Ben Hania et al. 2016
              - - A. hydrogeniformans (Maune & Tanner 2012) Ben Hania et al. 2016
                - A. thermoterrenum (Rees et al. 1997) Ben Hania et al. 2016
      - - Aminiphilaceae
          Aminiphilus circumscriptus Díaz et al. 2007
        - Synergistaceae
          - - Aminomonas paucivorans Baena et al. 1999
            - - Thermanaerovibrio
                - T. acidaminovorans (Guangsheng et al. 1997) Baena et al. 1999
                - T. velox Zavarzina et al. 2000
          - - Synergistes jonesii Allison et al. 1993
            - - Cloacibacillus
                - C. evryensis Ganesan et al. 2008
                - C. porcorum Looft et al. 2013
  - - Aminivibrionaceae
      - - Lactivibrio alcoholicus Qiu et al. 2014
        - - Aminivibrio pyruvatiphilus Honda et al. 2013
          - Fretibacterium fastidiosum Vartoukian et al. 2013
      - - Aminobacterium
          - A. thunnarium Hamdi et al. 2015
          - - A. colombiense Baena et al. 1999 (type sp.)
            - A. mobile Baena et al. 2000
    - Dethiosulfovibrionaceae
      - - Jonquetella anthropi Jumas-Bilak et al. 2007
        - - Rarimicrobium hominis Jumas-Bilak et al. 2015
          - - Pyramidobacter
              - P. piscolens Downes et al. 2009
              - P. porci Wylensek et al. 2021
      - - Dethiosulfovibrio
          - D. salsuginis Díaz-Cárdenas et al. 2010
          - - - D. faecalis Grabowski et al. 2022
              - D. peptidovorans Magot et al. 1997 (type sp.)
            - - D. marinus Surkov et al. 2001
              - - D. acidaminovorans Surkov et al. 2001
                - D. russensis Surkov et al. 2001

120 marker proteins based GTDB 10-RS226

- Synergistota
  - - Thermosynergistaceae
      Thermosynergistes pyruvativorans
    - Acetomicrobiaceae
      - Acetomicrobium
        - A. flavidum
        - A. thermoterrenum [incl. A. hydrogeniformans]
  - - - Thermovirgaceae
        Thermovirga lienii
    - - - - Aminithiophilaceae
            Aminithiophilus ramosus
        - - Aminiphilaceae
            Aminiphilus circumscriptus
          - Synergistaceae
            - - Aminomonas paucivorans
              - - Thermanaerovibrio
                  - T. acidaminovorans
                  - T. velox
            - - "Ca. Equadaptatus faecalis"
              - - Synergistes jonesii
                - - "Ca. Caccocola"
                    - "Ca. C. faecigallinarum" Gilroy et al. 2021
                    - "Ca. C. faecipullorum" Gilroy et al. 2021
                  - Cloacibacillus
                    - C. evryensis
                    - C. porcorum
      - - Aminobacteriaceae
          - - Aminivibrio pyruvatiphilus
            - Fretibacterium fastidiosum
          - - Aminobacterium
              - A. colombiense
              - A. mobile
        - Dethiosulfovibrionaceae
          - - Jonquetella anthropi
            - - Pyramidobacter
                - P. piscolens
                - P. porci
          - - Dethiosulfovibrio
              - D. salsuginis
              - - D. faecalis
                - - D. peptidovorans
                  - D. russensis

== Taxonomy ==
The currently accepted taxonomy is based on the List of Prokaryotic names with Standing in Nomenclature (LSPN) and the National Center for Biotechnology Information (NCBI).

- Phylum Synergistota Jumas-Bilak et al. 2021
  - Class Synergistia Jumas-Bilak et al. 2009
    - Order Synergistales Jumas-Bilak et al. 2009
      - Genus "Pacaella" Ndongo et al. 2017
        - Species ?"P. massiliensis" Ndongo et al. 2017
      - Genus "Candidatus Tammella" Hongoh et al. 2007
        - Species ?"Ca. T. caduceiae" Hongoh et al. 2007
      - Family Aminithiophilaceae Pradel et al. 2023
        - Genus Aminithiophilus Pradel et al. 2023
      - Family Acetomicrobiaceae Pradel et al. 2023
        - Genus Acetomicrobium Soutschek et al. 1985 [Anaerobaculum Rees et al. 1997]
      - Family Aminiphilaceae Pradel et al. 2023
        - Genus "Aminirhabdus" corrig. Liu et al. 2021 ["Aminirod" (sic]
          - Species ?"A. propionatiphilus" corrig. Liu et al. 2021
        - Genus Aminiphilus Díaz et al. 2007
      - Family Aminobacteriaceae Pradel et al. 2023
        - Genus Aminobacterium Baena et al. 1999
        - Genus Aminivibrio Honda et al. 2013
        - Genus Fretibacterium Vartoukian et al. 2013
        - Genus Lactivibrio Qiu et al. 2014
      - Family Dethiosulfovibrionaceae Pradel et al. 2023
        - Genus Dethiosulfovibrio Magot et al. 1997
        - Genus Jonquetella Jumas-Bilak et al. 2007
        - Genus Pyramidobacter Downes et al. 2009
        - Genus Rarimicrobium Jumas-Bilak et al. 2015
      - Family Synergistaceae Jumas-Bilak et al. 2009 [Clostridiales Family XV; Thermosynergistaceae Yang et al. 2021]
        - Genus Aminomonas Baena et al. 1999
        - Genus "Candidatus Caccocola" Gilroy et al. 2021
        - Genus ?Caenicola El Houari et al. 2025
        - Genus Cloacibacillus Ganesan et al. 2008 emend. Looft et al. 2013
        - Genus "Candidatus Equadaptatus" Gilroy et al. 2022
          - Species "Ca. E. faecalis" Gilroy et al. 2022
        - Genus Synergistes Allison et al. 1993
        - Genus Thermanaerovibrio Baena et al. 1999 emend. Palaniappan et al. 2013
      - Family Thermosynergistaceae Yang et al. 2021
        - Genus Thermosynergistes Yang et al. 2021
      - Family Thermovirgaceae Pradel et al. 2023
        - Genus Thermovirga Dahle and Birkeland 2006
