= Jonquetella =

Scientific classification
- Domain: Bacteria
- Kingdom: Thermotogati
- Phylum: Synergistota
- Class: Synergistia
- Order: Synergistales
- Family: Synergistaceae
- Genus: Jonquetella; Jumas-Bilak et al. 2007

Type species
- Jonquetella anthropi Jumas-Bilak et al. 2007

Species
- J. anthropi

Genus of bacteria

Jonquetella is a Gram-negative and strictly anaerobic genus of bacteria from the family of Synergistaceae with one known species (Jonquetella anthropi). Jonquetella anthropi has been isolated from a human cyst from Montpellier in France.

== See also ==
- List of bacteria genera
- List of bacterial orders
