= Acetithermum =

"Candidatus Acetithermum"

Scientific classification (Candidatus)
- Domain: Bacteria
- Kingdom: Thermotogati
- Phylum: "Acetithermota" corrig. Rinke et al. 2013
- Genus: "Ca. Acetithermum" corrig. Rinke et al. 2013
- Species: "Ca. Acetithermum autotrophicum"

Binomial name
- "Ca. Acetithermum autotrophicum" corrig. Takami et al. 2012

Synonyms
- "Acetothermia" Rinke et al. 2013; "Ca. Acetothermum" Takami et al. 2012; "Ca. Acetothermum autotrophicum" Takami et al. 2012

Thermophilic genus of candidate bacteria

"Candidatus Acetithermum" is a thermophilic bacterial genus, belonging to the monotypic phylum "Acetithermota" and non-monotypic kingdom Thermotogati. It has the sole species "Ca. Acetithermum autotrophicum".
