= Thermanaerovibrio =

Scientific classification
- Domain: Bacteria
- Kingdom: Thermotogati
- Phylum: Synergistota
- Class: Synergistia
- Order: Synergistales
- Family: Synergistaceae
- Genus: Thermanaerovibrio; Baena et al. 1999

Type species
- Thermanaerovibrio acidaminovorans (Guangsheng et al. 1997) Baena et al. 1999

Species
- T. acidaminovorans; T. velox

Synonyms
- Thermoanaerovibrio (sic)

Genus of bacteria

Thermanaerovibrio is a Gram-negative, non-spore-forming chemoorganotrophic and thermophilic genus of bacteria from the family of Synergistaceae.

== See also ==
- List of bacteria genera
- List of bacterial orders
