= Aminomonas =

Scientific classification
- Domain: Bacteria
- Kingdom: Thermotogati
- Phylum: Synergistota
- Class: Synergistia
- Order: Synergistales
- Family: Synergistaceae
- Genus: Aminomonas; Baena et al. 1999

Type species
- Aminomonas paucivorans Baena et al. 1999

Species
- A. paucivorans

Genus of bacteria

Aminomonas is a genus of bacteria from the family of Synergistaceae with one known species (Aminomonas paucivorans). Aminomonas paucivorans has been isolated from an anaerobic lagoon of a dairy wastewater treatment plant.

== See also ==
- List of bacteria genera
- List of bacterial orders
