= Pyramidobacter =

Scientific classification
- Domain: Bacteria
- Kingdom: Thermotogati
- Phylum: Synergistota
- Class: Synergistia
- Order: Synergistales
- Family: Synergistaceae
- Genus: Pyramidobacter; Downes et al. 2009

Type species
- Pyramidobacter piscolens Downes et al. 2009

Species
- P. arthritidis; P. piscolens; P. porci

Genus of bacteria

Pyramidobacter is a gram-negative genus of bacteria from the family Synergistaceae. The type Pyramidobacter piscolens has been isolated from the human mouth.
