= Aminobacterium =

Scientific classification
- Domain: Bacteria
- Kingdom: Thermotogati
- Phylum: Synergistota
- Class: Synergistia
- Order: Synergistales
- Family: Synergistaceae
- Genus: Aminobacterium; Baena et al. 1999

Type species
- Aminobacterium colombiense Baena et al. 1999

Species
- A. colombiense; A. mobile; A. thunnarium

Genus of bacteria

Aminobacterium is a Gram-negative genus of bacteria from the family of Synergistaceae.

== Phylogeny ==
16S rRNA based LTP_08_2023

- Aminobacterium
  - A. thunnarium Hamdi et al. 2015
  - - A. colombiense Baena et al. 1999
    - A. mobile Baena et al. 2000

120 marker proteins based GTDB 08-RS214

- Aminobacterium
  - A. colombiense
  - A. mobile

== See also ==
- List of bacterial orders
- List of bacteria genera
