= Casamino acid =

Mixture of amino acids

Casamino acid is the mixture of amino acids produced from acid hydrolysis of casein, a family of phosphoproteins found in mammalian milk. In comparison, tryptone describes casein that has undergone enzymatic degradation by the protease trypsin, leaving many smaller peptide chains alongside the free amino acids.

Casamino acid is used as a component of microbiological growth medium to support protein synthesis. However, tryptophan, an essential amino acid, is lost while digesting the casein with strong acids. Providing this abundant source of nitrogen can alter the phenotype of microorganisms, such as bacterial species recognizing nutrient-rich media and reducing their motility, as compared to their typical environmental behaviors.
