= 2-Fluoroadenine =

Names
- Preferred IUPAC name 2-Fluoro-7H-purin-6-amine
- Other names 2-FA

Identifiers
CAS Number	700-49-2
3D model (JSmol)	Interactive image
ChEBI	CHEBI:72457
ChEMBL	ChEMBL580404
ChemSpider	12264
ECHA InfoCard	100.152.774
EC Number	624-159-6
PubChem CID	12790
UNII	2C8H3H4EBG
CompTox Dashboard (EPA)	DTXSID80220264
- InChI: InChI=1S/C5H4FN5/c6-5-10-3(7)2-4(11-5)9-1-8-2/h1H,(H3,7,8,9,10,11) Key: WKMPTBDYDNUJLF-UHFFFAOYSA-N
- SMILES: C1=NC2=NC(=NC(=C2N1)N)F

Properties
Chemical formula	C_{5}H_{4}FN_{5}
Molar mass	153.120 g·mol^{−1}
Solubility in water	< 0.5 mM
Solubility	>=10 mM in DMSO

Hazards
- GHS labelling
Pictograms	(GHS07: Exclamation mark)
Signal word	Warning
Hazard statements	H315, H319, H335
Precautionary statements	P261, P264, P264+P265, P271, P280, P302+P352, P304+P340, P305+P351+P338, P319, P321, P332+P317, P337+P317, P362+P364, P403+P233, P405, P501
- Except where otherwise noted, data are given for materials in their standard state (at 25 °C [77 °F], 100 kPa). Infobox references

2-Fluoroadenine (2-FA) is a toxic adenine antimetabolite which can be used in laboratory biological research for counterselection of wildtype bacterial or eukaryotic (i.e. animals, yeast, plants, diatoms, brown algae) APT (adenine phosphoribosyltransferase) genes. Therefore, knockouts or mutants for APT, which are resistant to 2-FA, can be selected.

2-Fluoroadenine is a critical intermediate for pharmaceutical drugs and can be synthesized within the lab from 2,6-diaminopurine, which is an inexpensive and readily available compound. In the cell, 2-Fluoroadenine is synthesized and exhibits a large range of antibacterial activity. 2-Fluoroadenine acts as an inhibitor of blood-platelet adhesion, and when combined with actinobolin, produces a greater combined effect of preventing or treating infections. In cancer treatments, 2-Fluoroadenine, has been used to treat head and neck cell carcinoma by the progressive removal of RNA and protein synthesis within tumor cells.

== See also ==
- 5-Fluoroorotic acid (5-FOA)
