= 5-Fluoroorotic acid =

Names
- Preferred IUPAC name 5-Fluoro-2,6-dioxo-1,2,3,6-tetrahydropyrimidine-4-carboxylic acid

Identifiers
CAS Number	703-95-7; 220141-70-8 (monohydrate)
3D model (JSmol)	Interactive image
ChemSpider	62912
ECHA InfoCard	100.010.798
PubChem CID	69711
UNII	7IA9OUC93E
CompTox Dashboard (EPA)	DTXSID90220573
- InChI: InChI=1S/C5H3FN2O4/c6-1-2(4(10)11)7-5(12)8-3(1)9/h(H,10,11)(H2,7,8,9,12) Key: SEHFUALWMUWDKS-UHFFFAOYSA-N; InChI=1/C5H3FN2O4/c6-1-2(4(10)11)7-5(12)8-3(1)9/h(H,10,11)(H2,7,8,9,12) Key: SEHFUALWMUWDKS-UHFFFAOYAV
- SMILES: C1(=C(NC(=O)NC1=O)C(=O)O)F

Properties
Chemical formula	C_{5}H_{3}FN_{2}O_{4}
Molar mass	174.087 g·mol^{−1}
- Except where otherwise noted, data are given for materials in their standard state (at 25 °C [77 °F], 100 kPa). Infobox references

5-Fluoroorotic acid (5FOA) is a fluorinated derivative of the pyrimidine precursor orotic acid. It is used in yeast genetics to select for the absence of the URA3 gene, which encodes the enzyme for the decarboxylation of 5-fluoroorotic acid to 5-fluorouracil, a toxic metabolite. It has also been used in diatom selection.

== See also ==
- 2-FA
