= Thermotoga maritima =

- Outline of a Thermotoga maritima section showing the "toga"

Scientific classification
- Domain: Bacteria
- Kingdom: Thermotogati
- Phylum: Thermotogota
- Class: Thermotogae
- Order: Thermotogales
- Family: Thermotogaceae
- Genus: Thermotoga
- Species: T. maritima

Binomial name
- Thermotoga maritima Huber et al., 1986

Species of bacterium

Thermotoga maritima is a hyperthermophilic, anaerobic organism that is a member of the order Thermotogales. T. maritima is well known for its ability to produce hydrogen (clean energy) and it is the only fermentative bacterium that has been shown to produce hydrogen more than the Thauer limit (>4 mol H_{2} /mol glucose). It employs [FeFe]-hydrogenases to produce hydrogen gas (H_{2}) by fermenting many different types of carbohydrates.

== History ==
First discovered in the sediment of a marine geothermal area near Vulcano, Italy, Thermotoga maritima resides in hot springs as well as hydrothermal vents. The ideal environment for the organism is a water temperature of 80 °C (176 °F), though it is capable of growing in waters of 55–90 °C (131–194 °F). Thermotoga maritima and Geothermobacterium ferrireducens are the only bacteria known to grow at this high a temperature; the only other organisms known to live in environments this extreme are members of the domain Archaea. The hyperthermophilic abilities of T. maritima, along with its deep lineage, suggests that it is potentially a very ancient organism.

16S rRNA sequencing of Thermotoga maritima determined that the bacteria belong to the eubacteria phyla. However, as of a study published in 1986, the bacteria were not determined to have close relationships to any other group within this phyla. The majority of the lipids in the bacteria are unique in structure compared to other eubacteria. The peptidoglycan of T. maritima has unique structures and components as well. The peptidoglycan structure contains equal amounts of l- and d-lysine. A study published in 2009 revealed that d-lysine plays a crucial role in peptidoglycan synthesis, functioning as a substitute for l-lysine and forming novel cross-links within the structure.

== Physical attributes ==
Thermotoga maritima is a non-sporulating, rod shaped, gram-negative bacterium. When viewed under a microscope, it can be seen to be encased in a sheath-like envelope which resembles a toga, hence the "toga" in its name.

== Metabolism ==
As an anaerobic fermentative chemoorganotrophic organism, T. maritima catabolizes sugars and polymers and produces carbon dioxide (CO_{2}) and hydrogen (H_{2}) gas as by-products of fermentation. T. maritima is also capable of metabolizing cellulose as well as xylan, yielding H_{2} that could potentially be utilized as an alternative energy source to fossil fuels. Additionally, this species of bacteria is able to reduce Fe(III) to produce energy using anaerobic respiration. Various flavoproteins and iron-sulphur proteins have been identified as potential electron carriers for use during cellular respiration. However, when growing with sulfur as the final electron acceptor, no ATP is produced. Instead, this process eliminates inhibitory H_{2} produced from fermentative growth. Collectively, these attributes indicate that T. maritima has become resourceful and capable of metabolizing a host of substances in order to carry out its life processes.

== Clean energy (biohydrogen) from T. maritima ==
Energy is a growing need of the world and it is expected to grow in the next 20 years. Among various energy sources, hydrogen serves as the best energy carrier due to its higher energy content per unit weight. T. maritima is one of fermentative bacteria that produces hydrogen to levels that approach the thermodynamic limit (4 mol H_{2}/ mol glucose). However, similar to other fermentative bacteria, the biohydrogen yield in this bacterium does not go beyond 4 mol H_{2} / glucose (Thaeur limit) because of its inherent nature to use more energy for its own cell division to grow rapidly than producing H_{2}. Because of these reasons fermentative bacteria have not been thought to produce higher amounts of hydrogen at a commercial scale. Overcoming this limit by improving the conversion of sugar to H_{2} could lead to a superior H_{2} producing biological system that may supersede fossil fuel-based H_{2} production.

Metabolic engineering in this bacterium led to development of strains of T. maritima that surpassed the Thauer limit of hydrogen production. One of the strains, also known as Tma200, produced 5.77 mol H_{2}/ mol glucose which is the highest yield so far reported in a fermentative bacterium. In this strain, energy redistribution, and metabolic rerouting through the pentose phosphate pathway (PPP) generated excess reductants while uncoupling growth from hydrogen synthesis. Uncoupling of growth from product formation has been viewed as a viable strategy to maximize the product yield which has been achieved in the higher hydrogen producing bacterium. Similar strategies can be adopted for other hydrogen producing bacterium to maximize product yields.

In addition to hydrogen production, Thermotoga maritima DSM3109 expresses a novel thermostable transketolase (TK_{tmar}) that has an optimum temperature above 90°C and tolerates organic solvents. This enzyme can be used as a biocatalyst for industrial applications that use sugar transformations as it can from a stereospecific carbon–carbon bond used in the synthesis of prochiral ketones which are important precursors in biofuel production.

== Hydrogenase activity ==
Hydrogenases are metalloenzymes that catalyze the reversible hydrogen conversion reaction: H_{2} ⇄ 2 H^{+}+ 2 e^{−}. A Group C [FeFe]-hydrogenase from Thermotoga maritima (TmHydS) has shown modest hydrogen conversion activity and reduced sensitivity to the enzyme's inhibitor, CO, in comparison to Group A prototypical and bifurcating [FeFe]-hydrogenases. The TmHydS has a hydrogenase domain with distinct amino acid modifications in the active site pocket, including the presence of a Per-Arnt-Sim (PAS) domain.

== Genomic composition ==
The genome of T. maritima consists of a single circular 1.8 megabase chromosome encoding for 1877 proteins. Within its genome it has several heat and cold shock proteins that are most likely involved in metabolic regulation and response to environmental temperature changes. It shares 24% of its genome with members of the Archaea; the highest percentage overlap of any bacteria. This similarity suggests horizontal gene transfer between Archaea and ancestors of T. maritima and could help to explain why T. maritima is capable of surviving in such extreme temperatures and conditions. The genome of T. maritima has been sequenced multiple times. Genome resequencing of T. maritima MSB8 genomovar DSM3109 determined that the earlier sequenced genome was an evolved laboratory variant of T. maritima with an approximately 8-kb deletion. Moreover, a variety of duplicated genes and direct repeats in its genome suggest their role in intra-molecular homologous recombination leading to genes deletion. A strain with a 10-kb gene deletion has been developed using the experimental microbial evolution in T. maritima.

== Genetic system of Thermotoga maritima ==
Thermotoga maritima has a great potential in hydrogen synthesis because it can ferment a wide variety of sugars and has been reported to produce the highest amount of H_{2} (4 mol H_{2}/ mol glucose). Due to lack of a genetic system for the past 30 years majority of the studies have been either focused on heterologous gene expression in E. coli or predicting models since a gene knockout mutant of T. maritima remained unavailable. Developing a genetic system for T. maritima has been a challenging task primarily because of a lack of a suitable heat-stable selectable marker. Recently, the most reliable genetic system based on pyrimidine biosynthesis has been established in T. maritima. This newly developed genetic system relies upon a pyrE^{−} mutant that was isolated after cultivating T. maritima on a pyrimidine biosynthesis inhibiting drug called 5-fluoroorotic acid (5-FOA). The pyrE^{−} mutant is an auxotrophic mutant for uracil. The pyrE from a distantly related genus of T. maritima rescued the uracil auxotrophy of the pyrE^{−} mutant of T. maritima and has been proven to be a suitable marker.

For the first time, the use of this marker allowed the development of an arabinose (araA) mutant of T. maritima. This mutant explored the role of the pentose phosphate pathway of T. maritima in hydrogen synthesis. The genome of T. maritima possesses direct repeats that have developed into paralogs. Due to lack of a genetic system the true function of these paralogs has remained unknown. Recently developed genetic system in T. maritima has been very useful to determine the function of the ATPase protein (MalK) of the maltose transporter that is present in a multi-copy (three copies) fashion. The gene disruptions of all three putative ATPase encoding subunit (malK) and phenotype have concluded that only one of the three copies serves as an ATPase function of the maltose transporter. It is interesting to know that T. maritima has several paralogs of many genes and the true function of these genes is now dependent upon the use of the recently developed system. The newly developed genetic system in T. maritima has a great potential to make T. maritima as a host for hyperthermophilic bacterial gene expression studies. Protein expression in this model organism is promising to synthesize fully functional protein without any treatment.

== Evolution ==
Thermotoga maritima contains homologues of several competence genes, suggesting that it has an inherent system of internalizing exogenous genetic material, possibly facilitating genetic exchange between this bacterium and free DNA. Based on phylogenetic analysis of the small sub-unit of its ribosomal RNA, it has been recognized as having one of the deepest lineages of Bacteria. Furthermore, its lipids have a unique structure that differs from all other bacteria.
