= Thermosipho =

Scientific classification
- Domain: Bacteria
- Kingdom: Thermotogati
- Phylum: Thermotogota
- Class: Thermotogae
- Order: Thermotogales
- Family: Thermotogaceae
- Genus: Thermosipho; Huber, Woese, Langworthy, Fricke & Stetter, 1989

Type species
- Thermosipho africanus Huber et al. 1989

Species
- See text

Genus of gastropods

Thermosipho is a genus of Gram-negative staining, anaerobic, and mostly thermophilic and hyperthermophilic bacteria in the family Thermotogaceae.

== Phylogeny ==
The currently accepted taxonomy is based on the List of Prokaryotic names with Standing in Nomenclature (LPSN) and National Center for Biotechnology Information (NCBI).

16S rRNA based LTP_10_2024

- Thermosipho
  - T. ferrireducens Chen et al. 2021
  - - - T. atlanticus Urios et al. 2004
      - T. geolei L'Haridon et al. 2001
    - - T. activus Podosokorskaya et al. 2014
      - - - T. affectus Podosokorskaya et al. 2011
          - T. melanesiensis Antoine et al. 1997
        - - T. globiformans Kuwabara et al. 2010
          - - T. africanus Huber et al. 1989
            - T. japonicus Takai & Horikoshi 2000

120 marker proteins based GTDB 09-RS220

- Thermosipho
  - T. ferrireducens
  - - T. atlanticus
    - - - T. affectus
        - T. melanesiensis
      - - T. africanus
        - T. japonicus [incl. T. globiformans]

Species incertae sedis:

- Thermosipho ferriphilus Kendall et al. 2002

== See also ==
- List of bacteria genera
- List of bacterial orders
