= Thermotoga =

- Outline of a Thermotoga maritima section showing the "toga"

Scientific classification
- Domain: Bacteria
- Kingdom: Thermotogati
- Phylum: Thermotogota
- Class: Thermotogae
- Order: Thermotogales
- Family: Thermotogaceae
- Genus: Thermotoga; Huber et al. 1986

Type species
- Thermotoga maritima Huber et al. 1986

Species
- T. maritima; T. naphthophila; T. neapolitana; T. petrophila

Genus of bacteria

Thermotoga is a genus of the phylum Thermotogota. Members of Thermotoga are hyperthermophilic bacteria whose cell is wrapped in a unique sheath-like outer membrane, called a "toga".

The members of the phylum stain Gram-negative as they possess a thin peptidoglycan in between two lipid bilayers, albeit both peculiar. The peptidoglycan is unusual as the crosslink is not only meso-diaminopimelate as occurs in Pseudomonadota, but D-lysine. (Note: All proteinogenic amino acids have the L- configuration; in peptidoglycan some amino acids with the D- configuration are present. Lysine is synthesised from meso-diaminopimelate by Diaminopimelate decarboxylase)

The species are anaerobes with varying degrees of oxygen tolerance. They are capable of reducing elemental sulphur (S_{0}) to hydrogen sulphide.

Whether thermophily is an innovation of the lineage or an ancestral trait is unclear and cannot be determined.
The genome of Thermotoga maritima was sequenced in 1999, revealing several genes of archaeal origin, possibly allowing its thermophilic adaptation. The CG (cytosine-guanine) content of T. maritima is 46.2%; most thermophiles in fact have high CG content; this has led to the speculation that CG content may be a non-essential consequence to thermophily and not the driver towards thermophily.

== Name ==
The paper and the chapter in Bergey's manual were authored by several authors including the microbiologists Karl Stetter and Carl Woese.

The Neo-Latin feminine name "thermotoga" means "the hot outer garment", being a combination of the Greek noun θέρμη (therme, heat) or more correctly the adjective θερμός, ή, όν (thermos, e, on, hot) and the Latin feminine noun toga (the Roman outer garment).

== Members and relatives ==
The precise relation of the Thermotogota to other phyla is debated (v. bacterial phyla): several studies have found it to be deep-branching (in Bergey's manual it appeared in fact in "Volume I: The Archaea and the deeply branching and phototrophic Bacteria"), while other have found Firmicutes to be deep-branching with Thermotogota clustering away from the base.

The type species of the genus is T. maritima, first described in 1986. At the time, it was the first species of the phylum to be described. The genus Thermotoga now contains three official species. Recently eight species were transferred out of the genus and most of them ended up within the genus Pseudothermotoga by Bhandari & Gupta 2014. T. subterranea strain SL1 was found in a 70 °C deep continental oil reservoir in the East Paris Basin, France.

== Phylogeny ==
The currently accepted taxonomy is based on the List of Prokaryotic names with Standing in Nomenclature (LPSN) and National Center for Biotechnology Information (NCBI)

16S rRNA based LTP_10_2024

- Thermotoga
  - T. petrophila Takahata et al. 2001
  - - T. maritima Huber et al. 1986
    - T. neapolitana Jannasch et al. 1989

120 marker proteins based GTDB 09-RS220

- Thermotoga
  - T. neapolitana
  - - T. maritima
    - T. petrophila [incl. Thermotoga naphthophila Takahata et al. 2001]

== See also ==
- List of bacterial orders
- List of bacteria genera
