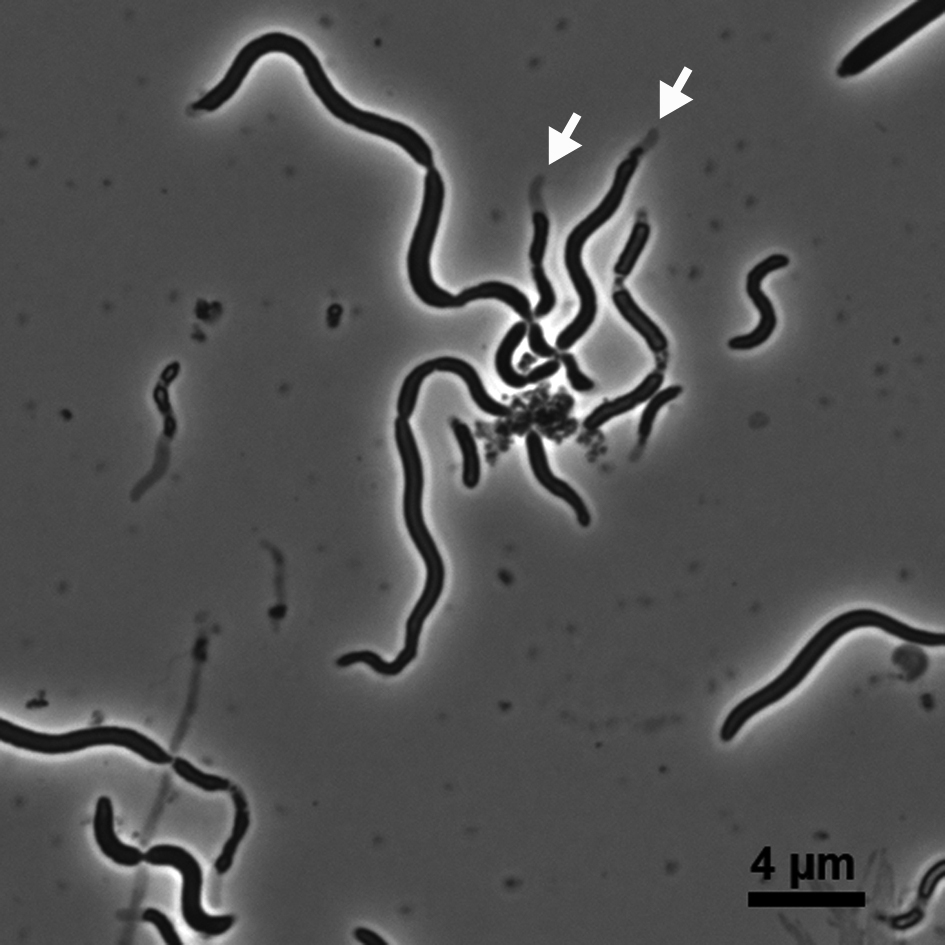
- Phase-contrast micrograph of Tepiditoga spiralis strain sy52T. The ‘toga’ structure is indicated by open arrow

Scientific classification
- Domain: Bacteria
- Kingdom: Thermotogati
- Phylum: Thermotogota; Reysenbach 2021
- Class: Thermotogae; Reysenbach 2002

Orders
- Kosmotogales; Mesoaciditogales; Petrotogales; Thermotogales

Synonyms
- Thermotogota: "Synthermota" Cavalier-Smith 2020; "Thermotogae" Reysenbach 2001; "Thermotogaeota" Oren et al. 2015; "Thermotogota" Whitman et al. 2018; Thermotogae: "Thermotogia" Cavalier-Smith 2020; Togobacteria Cavalier-Smith 2002

= Thermotogae =

Class of bacteria

The Thermotogae is a class of kingdom Thermotogati and domain Bacteria. It is the sole class in the phylum Thermotogota. The class Thermotogae is composed of Gram-negative staining, anaerobic, and mostly thermophilic and hyperthermophilic bacteria.

== Characteristics ==
The name of this class is derived from the thermophilic nature of many of its species, along with the characteristic sheath structure, or "toga", surrounding the cells of these species. In 2010, some Thermotogae who live in moderate temperatures were identified. Although Thermotogae species exhibit Gram-negative staining, they are bounded by a single-unit lipid membrane, and are thus monoderm bacteria. Because of the ability of some Thermotogae species to thrive at high temperatures, they are considered attractive targets for use in industrial processes. The metabolic ability of Thermotogae to utilize different complex-carbohydrates for production of hydrogen gas led to these species being cited as a possible biotechnological source for production of energy alternative to fossil fuels.

== Molecular signatures ==
Until recently, no biochemical or molecular markers were known that could distinguish the species from the class Thermotogae from all other bacteria. However, a comparative genomic study identified large numbers of conserved signature indels (CSIs) in important proteins that are specific for either all Thermotogae species or a number of its subgroups. Many of these CSIs in important housekeeping proteins such as Pol I, RecA, and TrpRS, and ribosomal proteins L4, L7/L12, S8, S9, etc. are uniquely present in different sequenced Thermotogae species providing novel molecular markers for this class. These studies also identified CSIs specific for each order and each family. These indels are the premise for the current taxonomic organization of the Thermotogae, and are strongly supported by phylogenomic analyses. Additional CSIs have also been found that are specific for Thermotoga, Pseudothermotoga, Fervidobacterium, and Thermosipho. These CSIs are specific for all species within each respective genus, and absent in all other bacteria, thus are specific markers. A clade consisting of the deep-branching species Petrotoga mobilis, Kosmotoga olearia, and "Thermotogales bacterium mesG1" was also supported by seven CSIs. Additionally, some CSIs that provided evidence of LGT among the Thermotogae and other prokaryotic groups were also reported. The newly discovered molecular markers provide novel means for identification and circumscription of species from the class in molecular terms and for future revisions to its taxonomy.

Additionally, a 51 aa insertion CSI was identified to be specific for all Thermotogales as well as Aquificales, another order comprising hyperthermophilic species. Phylogenetic studies demonstrated that the presence of the same CSI within these two unrelated groups of bacteria is not due to lateral gene transfer, rather the CSI likely developed independently in these two groups of thermophiles due to selective pressure. The insert is located on the surface of the protein in the ATPase domain, near the binding site of ADP/ATP. Molecular dynamic stimulations revealed a network of hydrogen bonds formed between water molecules, residues within the CSI and a ADP/ATP molecule. It is thought that this network helps to maintain ADP/ATP binding to the SecA protein at high temperatures, contributing to the overall thermostable phenotype some Thermotogales species.

== Phylogeny ==
16S rRNA based LTP_10_2024

- - - Mesoaciditogales
      - Mesoaciditogaceae
        - Athalassotoga
        - Mesoaciditoga
  - - - Petrotogales
        - Petrotogaceae
          - "Marinitogeae"
            Marinitoga
          - "Petrotogeae"
            - Tepiditoga
            - - - Oceanotoga
                - Geotoga
              - - Defluviitoga
                - Petrotoga
    - - Kosmotogales
        - Kosmotogaceae
          - Kosmotoga
          - - Kosmotoga 2
            - Mesotoga
      - Thermotogales
        - Fervidobacteriaceae
          Fervidobacterium
        - Thermotogaceae
          - Thermotoga
          - - Pseudothermotoga
            - Thermosipho

120 marker proteins based GTDB 10-RS226

- - - Mesoaciditogales
      - Mesoaciditogaceae
        - Athalassotoga
        - Mesoaciditoga
  - - Petrotogales
      - Kosmotogaceae
        - Mesotoga
        - Kosmotoga
      - Petrotogaceae
        - "Marinitogeae"
          Marinitoga
        - "Petrotogeae"
          - - Tepiditoga
            - - Oceanotoga
              - Geotoga
          - - Defluviitoga
            - Petrotoga
    - Thermotogales
      - - Thermotogaceae
          Thermotoga
        - "Pseudothermotogaceae"
          Pseudothermotoga
      - - Fervidobacteriaceae
          - Fervidobacterium
          - Thermosipho

== Taxonomy ==
This class is presently the sole class in the phylum Thermotogae and consists of four orders (Thermotogales, Kosmotogales, Petrotogales, and Mesoaciditogales) and five families (Thermatogaceae, Fervidobacteriaceae, Kosmotogaceae, Petrotogaceae, and Mesoaciditogaceae). It contains a total of 15 genera and 52 species. In the 16S rRNA trees, the Thermotogae have been observed to branch with the Aquificota (a phylum comprising hyperthermophilic organisms) in close proximity to the archaeal-bacterial branch point. However, a close relationship of the Thermotogae to the Aquificota, and the deep branching of the latter group of species, is not supported by phylogenetic studies based upon other gene/protein sequences. and also by conserved signature indels in several highly conserved universal proteins. The Thermotogae have also been scrutinized for their supposedly profuse Lateral gene transfer with Archaeal organisms. However, recent studies based upon more robust methodologies suggest that incidence of LGT between Thermotogae and other groups including Archaea is not as high as suggested in earlier studies.

The currently accepted taxonomy is based on the List of Prokaryotic names with Standing in Nomenclature (LPSN) and National Center for Biotechnology Information (NCBI)

- Class Thermotogae Reysenbach 2002
  - Genus ?Caldotoga Xue et al. 1999
  - Order Kosmotogales Bhandari & Gupta 2014
    - Family Kosmotogaceae Bhandari & Gupta 2014
      - Genus Kosmotoga DiPippo et al. 2009 [Thermococcoides Feng et al. 2010]
      - Genus Mesotoga Nesbo et al. 2013
  - Order Mesoaciditogales Itoh et al. 2015
    - Family Mesoaciditogaceae Itoh et al. 2015
      - Genus Athalassotoga Itoh et al. 2015
      - Genus Mesoaciditoga Reysenbach et al. 2013
  - Order Petrotogales Bhandari & Gupta 2014
    - Family Petrotogaceae Bhandari & Gupta 2014
      - Tribe "Marinitogeae" Pelletier 2012
        - Genus Marinitoga Wery et al. 2001
      - Tribe "Petrotogeae" Pelletier 2012
        - Genus Defluviitoga Ben Hania et al. 2012
        - Genus Geotoga Davey et al. 1993
        - Genus Oceanotoga Jayasinghearachchi and Lal 2011
        - Genus Petrotoga Davey et al. 1993
        - Genus Tepiditoga Mori et al. 2021
  - Order Thermotogales Reysenbach 2002
    - Family Fervidobacteriaceae Bhandari & Gupta 2014
      - Genus Fervidobacterium Patel et al. 1985
      - Genus Thermosipho Huber et al. 1989 non Kantor et al. 2013
    - Family "Pseudothermotogaceae" Pallen, Rodriguez-R & Alikhan 2022
      - Genus Pseudothermotoga Bhandari & Gupta 2014
    - Family Thermotogaceae Reysenbach 2002
      - Genus ?Thermopallium Duckworth et al. 1996
      - Genus Thermotoga Stetter and Huber 1986

== See also ==
- List of bacteria genera
- List of bacterial orders
