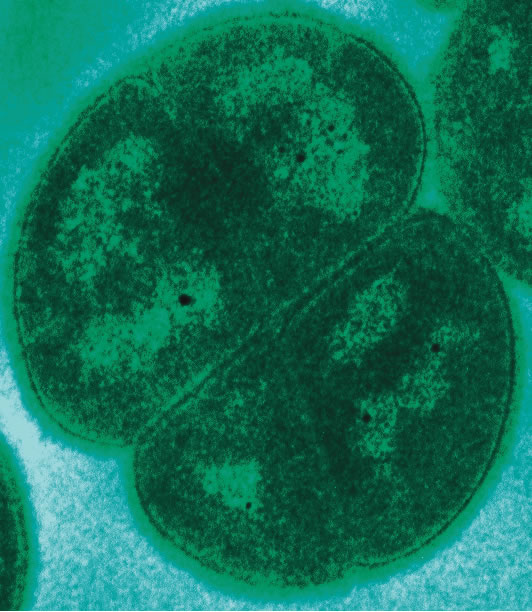

Scientific classification
- Domain: Bacteria
- Kingdom: Thermotogati; Battistuzzi and Hedges 2024

Type genus
- Thermotoga Stetter and Huber 1986

Phyla
- "Acetithermota"; "Bipolaricaulota"; Coprothermobacterota; Caldisericota; ?Deinococcota; Dictyoglomota; "Fraseribacteriota"; "Lithacetigenota"; Synergistota; Thermodesulfobiota; Thermotogota

Synonyms
- "DST"; "Thermotogae" Battistuzzi and Hedges 2009; "Thermotogida" Luketa 2012

= Thermotogati =

Kingdom of bacteria

Thermotogati is a kingdom of bacteria. They are united by the presence of an outer sheath-like membrane called a "toga".

== Phylogeny ==
The kingdom contains 3 valid and 2 candididate phyla:

Notes:

- "Acetithermota" phylum as recorded by LPSN contains only one genus, "Candidatus Acetithermum". NCBI considers it a synonym of "Bipolaricaulota" per Hao et al. 2018.
- Neither LTP nor GTDB resolves current Thermotogati as a monophyletic group. The smallest group that includes all definitionally included phyla and sister groups are presented. Thermotogati and its now included phyla are shown in **bold**.
- Phylogenies below the phylum level are available on the pages for these individual phyla.
- The trees are extracted from phylum trees in pages The All-Species Living Tree Project and Branching order of bacterial phyla (Genome Taxonomy Database, 2018). They are subject to the disclaimers on these pages.

16S rRNA based LTP_07_2026

- - Minisyncoccota
  - - - - - - Bacteriovoracia
            - - Abditibacteriota
              - Armatimonadota
          - - Oligoflexia
            - - **Thermodesulfobiota**
              - **Thermotogota**
        - - - Bradymonadia
            - - - "Fervidibacterota"
                - Thermoflexia
              - - **Coprothermobacterota**
                - Aquificota
          - - - Syntrophorhabdia
              - Atribacterota
            - - Elusimicrobiota
              - Deinococcota
      - - - Brevinematia
          - - Myxococcota
            - "Desulfuromonadota"
        - - Cyanobacteriota [incl. Vampirovibrionia]
          - - Thermodesulfovibrionia
            - Bacillota [incl. Desulfuribacillia; Erysipelotrichia]
    - - - - - - "Desulfatigladia"
              - "Leptospirillaeota"
            - Acidobacteriota
          - - Polyangiia
            - - Chlamydiota
              - - - Kiritimatiellota
                  - Lentisphaerota
                - Verrucomicrobiota
        - - - - Desulfomonilia
              - Syntrophia
            - Chloroflexota
          - - Desulfobacterota
            - - Planctomycetota
              - Actinomycetota
      - - - - Bdellovibrionota
            - - - Thermosulfidibacterota
                - Thermodesulfobacteriota
              - "Desulfovibrionota"
          - - Deltaproteobacteria~ [incl. Desulfobaccia; Dissulfuribacteria; Desulfarculia; Syntrophobacteria; Desulfobulbia]
            - - "Clostridiota"
              - - Chlorobiota [incl. Ignavibacteria]
                - - Balneolota
                  - - Rhodothermota
                    - Bacteroidota
        - - - - - **Caldisericota**
                - Vulcanimicrobiota
              - Gemmatimonadota
            - - Fusobacteriota
              - - **Synergistota**
                - Spirochaetota
          - - - Deferrisomatota
              - - - - Chrysiogenota
                    - Deferribacterota
                  - Campylobacterota
                - "Alphaproteobacteriota"
            - - - - Fidelibacterota
                  - Calditrichota
                - Fibrobacterota
              - Chromatibacteria [incl. Betaproteobacteria, Gammproteobacteria, Zetaproteobacteria, Magnetococcia]

120 marker proteins based GTDB 11-RS232

- **Thermotogati**
  - - - Dictyoglomota
      - Thermodesulfobiota
    - - Coprothermobacterota [incl. "Lithacetigenota"]
      - Caldisericota [incl. "Cryosericota"]
  - - Synergistota [incl. "Aminanaerobiota"]
    - - "Bipolaricaulota" [incl. "Acetithermota"; "Fraseribacteriota"]
      - Thermotogota

The proximity of Thermotogota to Synergistota is well-resolved in both trees. GTDB, which includes "Bipolaricaulota", supports its proximity to Deinococcota. However, the two trees do not appear to support the proximity between these two two-phylum groups.

Hao et al. (2018), using a CheckM genome tree constructed out of 43 marker genes, instead finds that "Bipolaricaulota" branches between Thermotogota and Synergistota, with Deinococcota branching relatively far away.

== See also ==
- List of bacterial orders
- List of bacteria genera
