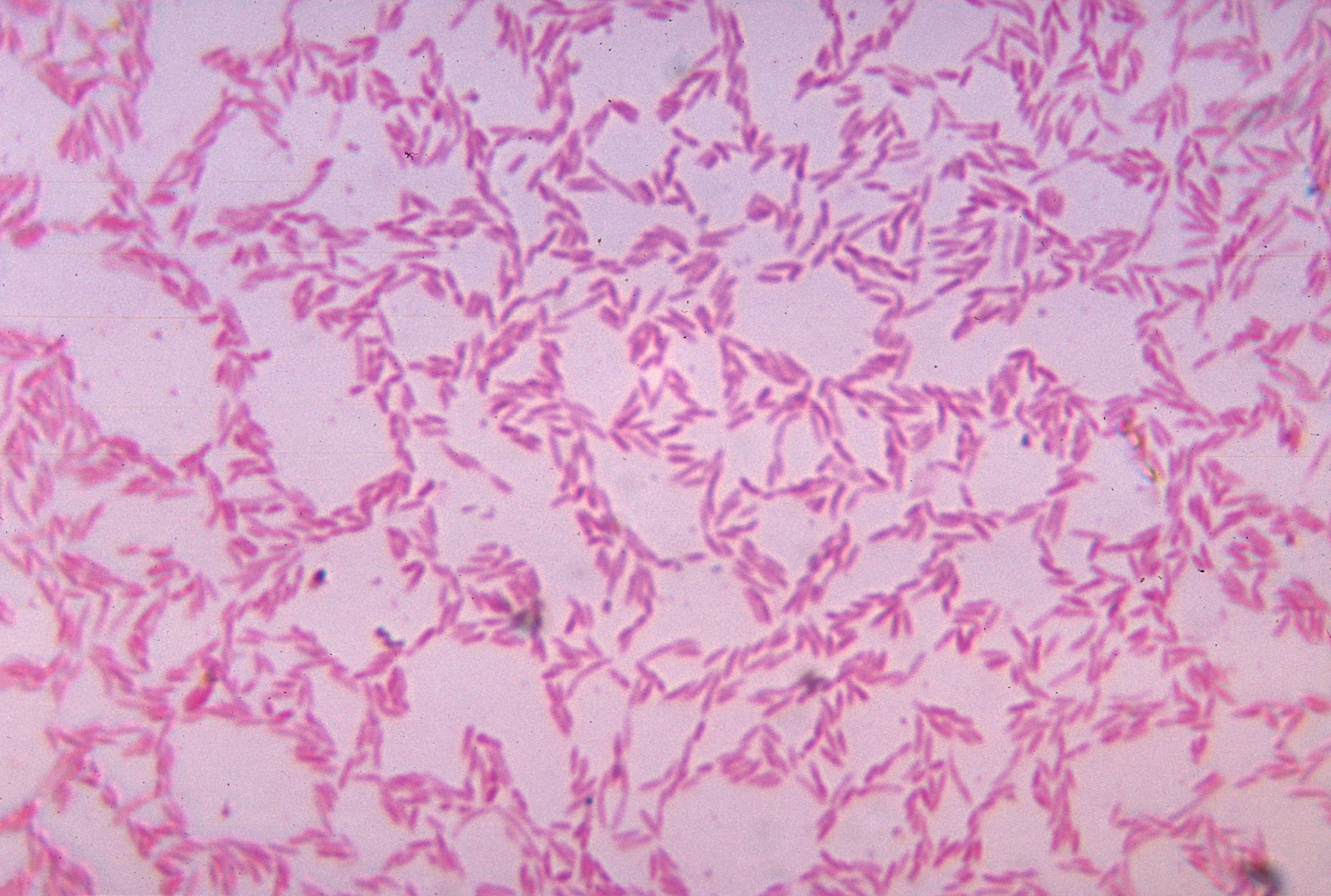
- Bacteroides spp.

Scientific classification
- Domain: Bacteria
- Kingdom: Pseudomonadati
- Superphylum: "FCB"

Phyla
- Bacteroidota–Chlorobiota group; Bacteroidota; Balneolota; Chlorobiota; Ignavibacteriota; Rhodothermota; "Ca. Kapabacteria"; "Ca. Kryptonia"; Calditrichota; Fibrobacterota; Gemmatimonadota; "Ca. Arandabacterota"; "Ca. Blakebacterota"; "Ca. Cloacimonadota"; "Ca. Delongiibacteriota"; "Ca. Edwardsiibacteriota"; "Ca. Eiseniibacteriota"; "Ca. Electryoneota"; "Ca. Fermentibacterota"; "Ca. Hydrothermota"; "Ca. Joyebacterota"; "Ca. Krumholzibacteriota"; "Ca. Latescibacterota"; "Ca. Marinisomatota"; "Ca. Orphanbacterota"; "Ca. Tangaroaeota"; "Ca. Zhuqueibacterota"; "Ca. "Zixibacteriota"

Synonyms
- Sphingobacteria Cavalier-Smith, 1987

= FCB superphylum =

FCB

Proposed superphylum of bacteria

The FCB is a proposed superphylum of bacteria named after the main member phyla Fibrobacterota, Chlorobiota, and Bacteroidota. The members are considered to form a clade due to a number of conserved signature indels.

Cavalier-Smith calls the equivalent grouping a phylum by the name of Sphingobacteria. It contains the classes Chlorobiota, Fibrobacterota, Bacteroidota, and Flavobacteria. However, this megaclassification is not followed by the larger scientific community.

FCB group

- "FCB"
  - "Hydrogenedentes"
  - - - "Fermentibacteria"
      - - Gemmatimonadota
        - "Latescibacteria"
    - - Fibrobacterota
      - - "Delphibacteria"
        - - - "Cloacimonetes"
            - "Zixibacteria"
          - - - Calditrichota
              - "Marinimicrobia"
            - - Bacteroidota–Chlorobiota
                - - Ignavibacteriota
                  - "Kryptonia"
                - - "Kapabacteria"
                  - - Chlorobiota
                    - - Rhodothermota
                      - Bacteroidota

16S rRNA based LTP_07_2026

- - - Fidelibacterota
    - Calditrichota
  - Fibrobacterota

- Gemmatimonadota

- - Chlorobiota [incl. Ignavibacteriota]
  - - Balneolota
    - - Rhodothermota
      - Bacteroidota

120 marker proteins based GTDB 11-RS232

- "FCB"
  - - "Hinthialibacterota" (OLB16)
    - "Tangaroaeota" (RBG-13-66-14; Coatesbacteria)
  - - - - - "Edwardsiibacteriota"
          - Caldifarciminota [incl. "Hydrothermota"; "Caldipriscota"; "Stahliibacteriota" ]
        - - "Fermentibacterota" [incl. "Aegiribacterota"]
          - "Cloacimonadota"
      - - - - "Arandabacterota"
            - "Orphanbacterota"
          - - "Eiseniibacteriota"
            - - "Joyebacterota" [incl. "Effluvivivacota"]
              - "Krumholzibacteriota" [incl. "Delphinibacteriota"]
        - - Gemmatimonadota [incl. "Glassiibacteriota"]
          - - "Latescibacterota" [incl. "Handelsmaniibacteriota"]
            - - "Blakebacterota"
              - - "Zixiibacteriota"
                - - - "Delongiibacteriota" (UBA4055)
                    - Fibrobacterota [incl. "Raymondiibacteriota"]
                  - - "Electryoneota" (AABM5-125-24)
                    - - Fidelibacterota [incl. "Marinisomatota"]
                      - - "Zhuqueibacterota" [incl. "Cosmopoliota"]
                        - - Calditrichota
                          - Bacteroidota [incl. Chlorobiota; Balneolota; Ignavibacteriota; "Kapaibacteriota"; "Kryptoniota"; Rhodothermota]

An analogous situation is seen with the PVC group/Planctobacteria.

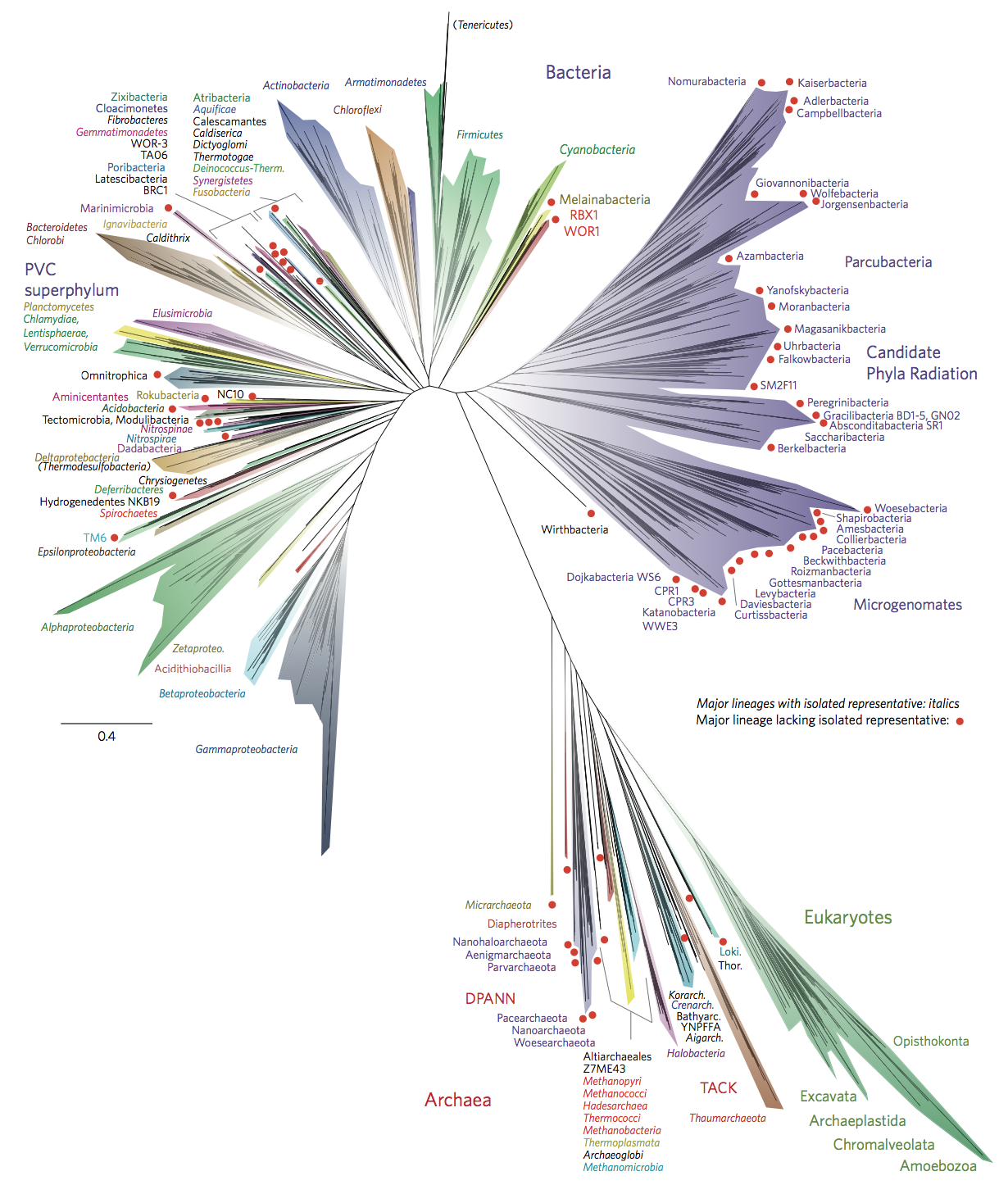
The Bacteroidota–Chlorobiota group in brown is visible on this 2016 tree of life using ribosomal protein sequences

== See also ==
- List of bacterial orders
- List of bacteria genera
