= Balneola =

Scientific classification
- Domain: Bacteria
- Kingdom: Pseudomonadati
- Phylum: Balneolota
- Class: Balneolia
- Order: Balneolales
- Family: Balneolaceae
- Genus: Balneola; Urios et al. 2006

Type species
- Balneola vulgaris Urios et al. 2006

Species
- B. alkaliphila Urios et al. 2008; B. vulgaris Urios et al. 2006

Genus of bacteria

Balneola is a genus of bacteria.

== See also ==
- List of bacterial orders
- List of bacteria genera
