= Delphibacteria =

Scientific classification (Candidatus)
- Domain: Bacteria
- Kingdom: Pseudomonadati
- Phylum: "Delphinibacteriota" corrig. Dudek et al. 2017

Delphibacteria is a candidate bacterial phylum in the FCB group. The phylum was first proposed after analysis of two genomes from the mouths of two bottlenose dolphins. "Dephibacteria" was proposed in recognition of the first genomic representatives having been recovered from the dolphin mouth. Members of the Delphibacteria phylum have been retroactively detected in a variety of environments.

== Description ==
Delphibacteria is a bacterial phylum with candidate status, meaning it has no cultured representatives as of yet. It is part of the FCB group.

== History ==
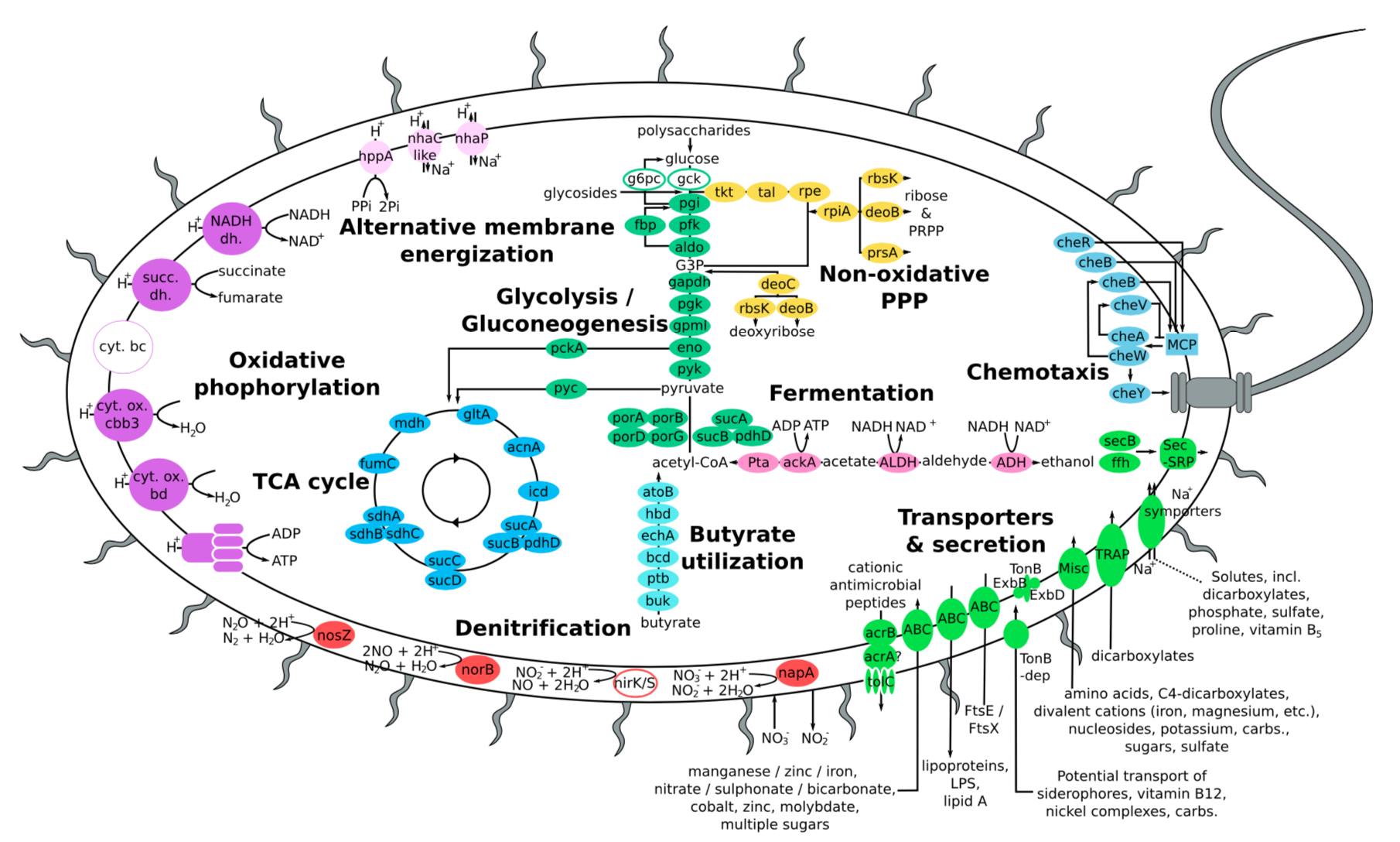
Metabolic reconstruction of a member of the Delphibacteria phylum. Key predicted metabolic and functional features are depicted. Genes of interest are denoted by abbreviations in the colored shapes. Filled shapes represent genes predicted to be present or likely to be present, whereas unfilled shapes represent genes that were not identified.

The phylum was first proposed following the recovery and analysis of two genomes, each from the mouth of a different bottlenose dolphin. These dolphins were part of the US Navy's Marine Mammal Program, although Delphibacteria 16S rRNA genes have also been detected in the mouths of wild dolphins living off the coast of Florida, U.S. The first characterized member of the Delphibacteria phylum was inferred to be a heterotrophic organism with the genomic potential for oxygen and most likely nitrate reduction. It was hypothesized that the ability to perform denitrification may have an impact on dolphin physiology and health, given that in humans denitrification by oral bacteria can affect oral and gastric blood flow, signalling in bacteria-bacteria and bacteria-host interactions, and mucus thickness in the stomach.

The name "Delphibacteria" was proposed in recognition of the first genomic representatives having been recovered from the dolphin mouth (Family Delphinidae) and due to its ubiquity in dolphin mouths. Members of the Delphibacteria phylum have been detected (retroactively) in a variety of environments, including bottom water from the Northern Bering Sea (EU734960.1), marine sediment from the Logatchec hydrothermal vent (FN554086.1), and deep sea sediment from the Okinawa Trough (KX097792.1).
