= Balneolaceae =

Scientific classification
- Domain: Bacteria
- Kingdom: Pseudomonadati
- Phylum: Balneolota
- Class: Balneolia
- Order: Balneolales
- Family: Balneolaceae; Xia et al. 2016

Genera
- Aliifodinibius; Balneola; Fodinibius; Gracilimonas; Halalkalibaculum; Rhodohalobacter

Family of bacteria

Balneolaceae is a family of bacteria.

== Phylogeny ==
The currently accepted taxonomy is based on the List of Prokaryotic names with Standing in Nomenclature (LPSN) and National Center for Biotechnology Information (NCBI).

16S rRNA based LTP_08_2023

- - - Halalkalibaculum
    - Aliifodinibius
  - - - Fodinibius
      - Rhodohalobacter
    - - Balneola
      - Gracilimonas

120 marker proteins based GTDB 10-RS226

- - - Halalkalibaculum Wu et al. 2022
    - Fodinibius Wang et al. 2012 [incl. Aliifodinibius Wang et al. 2013]
  - - Rhodohalobacter Xia et al. 2017
    - - Balneola Urios et al. 2006
      - Gracilimonas Choi et al. 2009

== See also ==
- List of bacterial orders
- List of bacteria genera
