= Kryptonia =

Scientific classification (Candidatus)
- Domain: Bacteria
- Kingdom: Pseudomonadati
- Phylum: Kryptoniota corrig. Eloe-Fadrosh et al. 2016

Class
- "Kryptonia"

Synonyms
- "Kryptonia" (sic) Eloe-Fadrosh et al. 2016

Phylum of bacteria

Kryptonia is a bacterial phylum with candidate status. It is a member of the FCB group.

The phylum was first proposed in 2016 following the recovery of genomes from a large-scale effort to mine metagenomic and single-cell genomic datasets for novel bacterial diversity. Extensive analysis of 5.2 Tb of metagenomic data from around the world suggests members of Kryptonia are found exclusively in high-temperature pH-neutral geothermal springs, such as the Jinze pool (Yunnan Province, China), Dewar Creek Spring (British Columbia, Canada), and Great Boiling Spring (Nevada, USA). Due to primer mismatches, members of this phylum have been widely under-detected in 16S rRNA sequencing-based surveys of community composition.

Analysis of the first genomes recovered from this group (from four different genera) suggests that members of Kryptonia are heterotrophs with a putative capacity for iron respiration. They are inferred to be incapable of some producing key metabolic compounds on their own (e.g.: biotin (also known as vitamin B7 or vitamin H) and certain amino acids), and thus may be metabolically dependent on other microbes in their environment, although the nature of such a relationship is unknown.

The name "Kryptonia" is derived from the Greek work "krupton", which means "hidden" or "secret". This is a nod to the phylum having hitherto eluded detection due to SSU rRNA primer biases.

== Taxonomy ==
The currently accepted taxonomy is based on the List of Prokaryotic names with Standing in Nomenclature (LPSN) and National Center for Biotechnology Information (NCBI).

Phylogeny of "Kryptonia"

- "Ca. Kryptonium"
  - "Ca. Thermokryptus mobilis"
  - - "Ca. Chryseopegocella kryptomonas"
    - - "Ca. Kryptobacter tengchongensis"
      - "Ca. K. thompsonii"

- Class "Kryptonia"
  - Order "Kryptoniales"
    - Family "Kryptoniaceae"
      - Genus "Ca. Chrysopegocella" Eloe-Fadrosh et al. 2016 corrig. Oren et al. 2020 ["Ca. Chrysopegis" (sic)]
        - "Ca. C. kryptomonas" Eloe-Fadrosh et al. 2016 corrig. Oren et al. 2020
      - Genus "Ca. Kryptobacter" Eloe-Fadrosh et al. 2016
        - "Ca. K. tengchongensis" Eloe-Fadrosh et al. 2016
      - Genus "Ca. Kryptonium" Eloe-Fadrosh et al. 2016
        - "Ca. K. thompsonii" corrig. Eloe-Fadrosh et al. 2016
      - Genus "Ca. Thermokryptus" Eloe-Fadrosh et al. 2016
        - "Ca. T. mobilis" Eloe-Fadrosh et al. 2016 ["Candidatus Kryptonium mobile" Hedlund et al. 2022]

== See also ==
- List of bacteria genera
- List of bacterial orders
