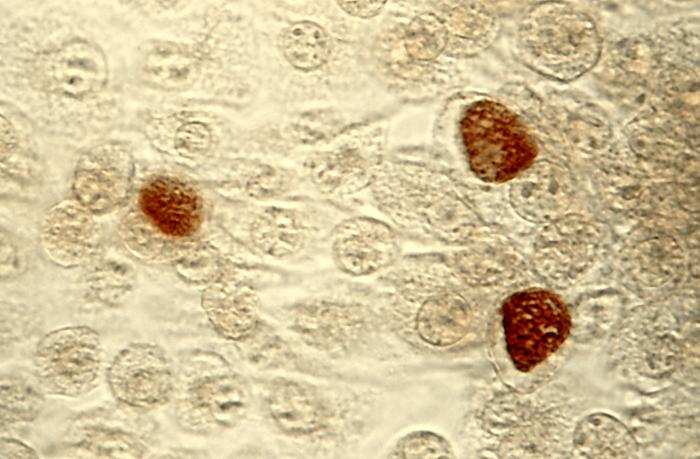
- Chlamydia trachomatis

Scientific classification
- Domain: Bacteria
- Kingdom: Pseudomonadati
- Superphylum: "PVC"

Phyla
- "Abyssobacterota"; "Auribacterota"; Chlamydiota; "Hydrogenedentota"; Kiritimatiellota; Lentisphaerota; "Omnitrophota"; Planctomycetota; Verrucomicrobiota

Synonyms
- "Pirellae" Margulis & Schwartz 1998; "Pirellobacteria" Margulis & Schwartz 1998; "Planctobacteria" Cavalier-Smith 1987; "Proteinomuri" Pelletier 2012 nom. nud.; "Euplancta" Cavalier-Smith 2020

= PVC superphylum =

PVC

Superphylum of bacteria

The PVC is a superphylum of bacteria named after its three important members, Planctomycetota, Verrucomicrobiota, and Chlamydiota. Cavalier-Smith postulated that the PVC bacteria probably lost or reduced their peptidoglycan cell wall twice. It has been hypothesised that a member of the PVC clade might have been the host cell in the endosymbiotic event that gave rise to the first proto-eukaryotic cell.

Cavalier-Smith calls the same group Planctobacteria and considers it a phylum. However, this is not followed by the larger scientific community. In the Cavalier-Smith bacterial megaclassification, it is within the bacterial Gracilicutes infra-kingdom and comprises the phyla Chlamydiota, Lentisphaerota, Planctomycetota, Verrucomicrobiota.

== Phylogeny ==
Rappe & Giovannoni 2003, Woese 1987, Wagner & Horn 2006, Spring et al. 2016

- PVC
  - "Auribacterota"
  - - - "Omnitrophota"
      - Planctomycetota
    - - Chlamydiota
      - - Kiritimatiellota
        - - Lentisphaerota
          - Verrucomicrobiota

120 marker proteins based GTDB 11-RS232

- "Planctobacteria"
  - - "Abyssobacterota"
    - "Hydrogenedentota"
  - - Planctomycetota [incl. "Saltatorellota"]
    - - "Auribacterota"
      - - Chlamydiota
        - Verrucomicrobiota [incl. Kiritimatiellota; Lentisphaerota]

== Molecular signatures ==
Planctomycetota, Verrucomicrobiota, and Chlamydiota in the traditional molecular phylogeny view are considered as phyla and also cluster together in the PVC superphylum, along with the candidate phyla Omnitrophica (previously OP3) and the Poribacteria. An important molecular marker in the form of a conserved signature protein has been found to be consistently shared by PVC members, with the exception of Poribacteria. The conserved signature protein may be a marker that represents a synapomorphic quality and a means to distinguish this bacterial group. In 2014, studies have characterized this protein and it has been attributed to play an important housekeeping function in DNA/RNA binding. This observation not only provides a means to demarcate the PVC superphylum, but it supports strongly supports an evolutionary relationship shared by this clade that is distinct from other bacteria.

Conserved signature indels (CSIs) have also been found specific for the Planctomycetota, Verrucomicrobiota, and Chlamydiota that distinguish each respective phylum from one another, and from other bacteria. A three-amino-acid insert in the RNA polymerase protein RpoB has been found that is shared by all sequenced Verrucomicrobia, Chlamydiae, and Lentisphaerae species. The CSI is absent from neighbouring Planctomycetes' and Poribacteria, suggesting common ancestry among the groups for which the CSI is specific.

Additional lines of evidence for the existence of this clade have been found. These include the presence of membrane coat-like proteins, tubulin, sterol synthesis, and the presence of condensed DNA, all of which have been interpreted by some authors as potential evidence for a close phylogenetic relationship with eukaryotes and Archaea, dubbed "1-domain model." An alternative model explains their similarity with eukaryotes as the result of an endosymbiotic fusion between a PVC bacterium and an engulfed archaeon that produced the first proto-eukaryotic cell.

== See also ==
- List of bacterial orders
- List of bacteria genera
