= Zixibacteria =

Scientific classification (Candidatus)
- Domain: Bacteria
- Kingdom: Pseudomonadati
- Phylum: Zixibacteria; Castelle et al. 2013

Phylum of bacteria

Zixibacteria is a bacterial phylum with candidate status, meaning it had no cultured representatives. It is a member of the FCB group

Zixibacteria was proposed as a bacterial phylum following the recovery of a genome from representative RBG-1. This genome was recovered using genome-resolved metagenomics from sediment samples of an aquifer adjacent to the Colorado River (CO, USA) and was suggestive of metabolically versatility, which is presumably requisite for life in a rapidly changing environment such as aquifer sediments

Since being proposed as a phylum in 2013, members of the Zixibacteria phylum have been detected in a variety of other environments (sometimes retroactively), including subsurface sediments (WA, USA), estuary water (NC, USA), moonmilk cave deposits (Comblain-au-Pont, Belgium), and deep subsurface fracture fluids from a gold mine (SD, USA)

== See also ==
- List of bacterial orders
- List of bacteria genera
