= Kiritimatiellota =

Scientific classification
- Domain: Bacteria
- Kingdom: Pseudomonadati
- Superphylum: "PVC"
- Phylum: Kiritimatiellota; Spring et al. 2021

Classes
- Kiritimatiellae Spring et al. 2017; Tichowtungiia Mu et al. 2020

Synonyms
- "Kiritimatiellaeota" Spring et al. 2016

Phylum of bacteria

The Kiritimatiellota are a phylum of Gram-negative bacteria. Although widespread in low concentrations, they have been primarily found in digestion tracts and oxygen poor aquatic environments where they break down saccharides, especially sulfated polysaccharides. The phylum is named for the type strain Kiritimatilella glycovorans, the name is derived from the Kiritimati atoll where the type strain was found in a hyper-saline pool. There are currently few cultivated strains from this phylum all of which are from aquatic habitats. Thus, there is limited understanding of the metabolism and physiology of the group as a whole. The lack of cultivated strains has resulted in taxonomical sparse phylum dspite ecological prevalence. Only three genera are assigned to the phylum, two in class Kritimatiellae, and one in Tichowtungiia. They are Kiritimatiella, Pontiella, and Tichowtungia respectively. Pontiella is the best understood as most of the cultivated strains come from this genus. The clade that now makes up this phylum was originally classified as phylum Verrucomicrobia subdivision 5. After the first strain was successfully cultured, there was sufficient evidence to re-categorize the clade as a sister phyla to Verrucomicrobia.

== Morphology ==
All cultivated strains are coccoid, non-motile and non-spore-forming. However the species Pontiella agarivorans contains the genes necessary for flagella and regulates some of those genes. It is possible that other as of yet uncultivated strains do have functional flagella and adaptations for motility. Multiple strains have been shown to produce exopolymers which can attach multiple cells in broth cultures. As a whole the clade is mesophilic and adapted for a roughly neutral pH.

== Ecology ==
Research suggests that members of this phylum play an important role in their environments breaking down sulfated polysaccharides such as the fucoidans from brown algae. The sulfate groups make these compounds a relatively difficult form of carbon to digest, and must be removed by sulfatases. Kiritimatiellota are specialized for this metabolism. K. glycovorans for example has 56 different sulfatases.

Kiritimatiellota are found in the gut microbe of diverse hosts including Asian elephants, horses, deep sea isopods and many other organisms. Notably, it has not been detected in the human or mouse microbiome. Researchers theorize that it may compete for a similar niche as Akkermansia. Beyond aiding in the digestion of polysaccharides members of genus Pontiella have been shown to fix nitrogen. This may augment available nitrogen in hosts with a nitrogen poor diet. This particular interaction was first theorized based on observations in the guts of deep sea isopods feeding on sargassum. It could also be impactful on the ecology of sediment dwelling strains. Studies have shown that Kiritimatiellota is a dominant component of certain soil assemblages. One study on wetland soils found that Kiritimatiellota has higher abundance and activity growing in association with roots.
