= Ignavibacteriales =

Ignavibacteriota

Scientific classification
- Domain: Bacteria
- Kingdom: Pseudomonadati
- Phylum: Ignavibacteriota
- Class: "Ignavibacteriia"
- Order: Ignavibacteriales; Iino et al. 2010

Families
- Ignavibacteriaceae; Melioribacteraceae

Synonyms
- Ignavibacteriota: "Ignavibacteriae" Podosokorskaya et al. 2013; "Ignavibacteraeota" Oren et al. 2015; "Ignavibacteriota" Whitman et al. 2018; Ignavibacteria: "Ignavibacteriia" Cavalier-Smith 2020

Family of bacteria

The Ignavibacteriales are an order of obligately anaerobic, non-photosynthetic bacteria that are closely related to the green sulfur bacteria.

== Classification ==
The currently accepted taxonomy is based on the List of Prokaryotic names with Standing in Nomenclature (LPSN) and National Center for Biotechnology Information (NCBI).

16S rRNA based LTP_10_2024

- Ignavibacteriales
  - Ignavibacteriaceae
    Ignavibacterium album Iino et al. 2010
  - Melioribacteraceae
    - Melioribacter roseus Podosokorskaya et al. 2013
    - Stygiobacter electus Podosokorskaya et al. 2024

120 marker proteins based GTDB 10-RS226

- Ignavibacteriales
  - Ignavibacteriaceae
    Ignavibacterium album Iino et al. 2010
  - Melioribacteraceae
    - Stygiobacter electus Podosokorskaya et al. 2024
    - - Melioribacter roseus Podosokorskaya et al. 2013
      - - Rosettibacter
          - R. firmus Podosokorskaya et al. 2024
          - R. primus Podosokorskaya et al. 2024

- "Candidatus Ethanivorans Liu et al. 2024
  - "Ca. E. selenatireducens" Liu et al. 2024
- Family Ignavibacteriaceae Iino et al. 2010
  - Ignavibacterium Iino et al. 2010
    - I. album Iino et al. 2010
- Family Melioribacteraceae Podosokorskaya et al. 2013
  - Melioribacter Podosokorskaya et al. 2013
    - M. roseus Podosokorskaya et al. 2013
  - "Pyranulibacter" Podosokorskaya et al. 2025
    - "P. aquaticus" Podosokorskaya et al. 2025
  - Rosettibacter Podosokorskaya et al. 2024
    - R. firmus Podosokorskaya et al. 2024
    - R. primus Podosokorskaya et al. 2024
  - Stygiobacter Podosokorskaya et al. 2024
    - S. electus Podosokorskaya et al. 2024

== See also ==
- List of bacteria genera
- List of bacterial orders
