= Fermentibacteria =

Scientific classification (Candidatus)
- Domain: Bacteria
- Kingdom: Pseudomonadati
- Phylum: Fermentibacterota corrig. Kirkegaard 2016

Class
- "Fermentibacteria"

Synonyms
- "Aegiribacteria" Hamilton et al. 2016; "Fermentibacteria" (sic)

Phylum of bacteria

Fermentibacteria (formerly Hyd24-12) is a bacterial phylum with candidate status.

The original clone sequence used to define Fermentibacteria as a phylum (AJ535232) was recovered from the Hydrate Ridge cold seep environment (Cascadia Margin, offshore from OR, USA). The first genomes from this phylum were recovered from samples of full-scale mesophilic anaerobic digesters at Danish wastewater treatment facilities. All three genomes recovered were inferred to represent organisms that rely on fermentation of simple sugars as an energy source, and thus the name "Fermentibacteria" (as in "to ferment") was proposed.

Members of this phylum have been detected in a broad range of environments, including methane seeps, coral reef sands, and the dolphin mouth.

== Classification ==
The currently accepted taxonomy is based on the List of Prokaryotic names with Standing in Nomenclature (LPSN) and National Center for Biotechnology Information (NCBI).

120 marker proteins based GTDB 11-RS232

- - "Ca. Fermentibacter" Kirkegaard et al. 2016
  - - "Ca. Aegiribacteria" Hamilton et al. 2016
    - "Ca. Sabulitectum" Saad et al. 2017

- Class "Fermentibacteria" Kirkegaard 2016
  - Order "Fermentibacterales" Kirkegaard 2016
    - Family "Fermentibacteraceae" Kirkegaard 2016
      - Genus "Candidatus Aegiribacteria" Hamilton et al. 2016 [MLS_C]
      - Genus "Candidatus Fermentibacter" Kirkegaard 2016
        - Species "Ca. F. daniensis" Kirkegaard 2016
      - Genus "Candidatus Sabulitectum" Saad et al. 2017
        - Species "Ca. S. silens" Saad et al. 2017

== See also ==
- List of bacterial orders
- List of bacteria genera
