= Caldifarciminota =

Scientific classification
- Domain: Bacteria
- Kingdom: Pseudomonadati
- Phylum: Caldifarciminota; Mori et al. 2026

Type genus
- Caldifarcimen Mori et al. 2026

Classes
- Caldifarciminia; "Tepidihabitantia"

Synonyms
- "Candidatus Caldipriscota" corrig. Colman et al. 2016; "Candidatus Hydrothermota" corrig. Jungbluth et al. 2017; "Candidatus Stahliibacteriota" corrig. Dombrowski et al. 2017; Candidate phylum WOR-3

Phylum of bacteria

Caldifarciminota is a phylum of bacteria from the kingdom Pseudomonadati, closely related to Cloacimonadota. This lineage was identified as the candidate phylum WOR-3, based on metagenome-assembled genomes of samples from various environments. The earliest report of WOR-3 dates back to 1994. The type species Caldifarcimen microaerophilum was isolated and described in 2026.

It is widely distributed in various environments, including hot springs, marine ecosystems, and hydrothermal vents, yet its ecological roles and metabolic capabilities remain poorly understood.

== Nomenclature ==
Three candidate phylum names have been proposed for the WOR-3 lineage: the phylum "Candidatus Pyropristinus" was proposed for the MAG sequence of "Candidatus Caldipriscus" sp. T1.2 from the Bechler Spring microbial filament in Yellowstone National Park in 2016, the phylum "Candidatus Hydrothermae" was named after the representative MAG sequence of "Candidatus Hydrothermae pacifica" JdFR-72 retrieved from a Juan de Fuca Ridge flank subsurface fluid in 2017, and the phylum "Candidatus Stahlbacteria" was proposed for several MAG sequences belonging to the WOR-3 lineage in the absence of representatives in 2017.

According to the International Code of Nomenclature of Prokaryotes these three candidate phylum names were later corrected to "Candidatus Caldipriscota", "Candidatus Hydrothermota", and "Candidatus Stahliibacteriota".

The validly published name Caldifarciminota is based on the name of the species Caldifarcimen microaerophilum, a facultatively anaerobic, thermophilic, Gram-negative bacterium isolated from a deep-sea hydrothermal field in 2026.

Etymology: The Latin adjective caldus means hot, the Latin neutrum farcimen means a sausage.

== Systematics ==
The currently accepted taxonomy is based on the List of Prokaryotic names with Standing in Nomenclature (LPSN) and National Center for Biotechnology Information (NCBI).

- Class ?"Stahliibacteriia" [UBA3073]
- Class "Tepidihabitantia" Slobodkina et al. 2025
  - Order "Tepidihabitantales" Slobodkina et al. 2025
    - Family "Tepidihabitantaceae" Slobodkina et al. 2025
      - Genus "Candidatus Tepidihabitans" Slobodkina et al. 2025
- Class Caldifarciminia Mori et al. 2026 ["Hydrothermia" Chuvochina et al. 2023]
  - Order Caldifarciminales Mori et al. 2026
    - Family Caldifarciminaceae Mori et al. 2026
      - Genus Caldifarcimen Mori et al. 2026
  - Order "Hydrothermales" Chuvochina et al. 2019 (EM3)
    - Family "Hydrothermaceae" Chuvochina et al. 2019
      - Genus "Candidatus Hydrothermus" Chuvochina et al. 2019
  - Order "Caldipriscales" Pallen, Rodriguez-R & Alikhan 2022 [LBFQ01]
    - Family "Caldipriscaceae" Pallen, Rodriguez-R & Alikhan 2022 [LBFQ01]
      - Genus "Candidatus Caldipriscus" Colman et al. 2016
      - Genus ?"Candidatus Thermoproauctor" Colman et al. 2016

Phylogeny of Caldifarciminota

- - "Stahliibacteriia"
  - - "Tepidihabitantia"
      - "Tepidihabitantales"
        - "Tepidihabitantaceae"
          "Ca. Tepidihabitans"
    - Caldifarciminia
      - "Hydrothermales"
        - "Hydrothermaceae"
          "Ca. Hydrothermus"
      - "Caldipriscales"
        - "Caldipriscaceae"
          "Ca. Caldipriscus"

== See also ==
- List of bacterial orders
- List of bacteria genera
