= Auribacterota =

Scientific classification (Candidatus)
- Domain: Bacteria
- Kingdom: Pseudomonadati
- Phylum: Auribacterota Williams et al. 2022

Classes
- "Ca. Ancaeobacteria"; "Ca. Auribacteria"; "Ca. Erginobacteria"; "Ca. Tritonobacteria"

Synonyms
- "Ca. Aureabacteria" Momper et al. 2017 emend. Williams et al. 2022; SURF-CP-2

Auribacterota is a candidate bacterial phylum of uncultured anaerobes first found in gold mine fluids. The name comes from Latin aurum (gold). It is known only from metagenomes.

These bacteria are strict fermenters. They eat sugars and amino acids, and make H_{2} and H_{2}S. No oxygen is used. Some of these bacteria have gas vesicles or pili.

The bacteria live in anoxic water columns, sediments, and subsurface. They are common in Ace Lake, Antarctica (up to 4% of microbes). They help break down dead stuff and cycle sulfur.

There are four candidate classes. Type species: "Candidatus Auribacter fodinae".

== Phylogeny ==
The phylum Auribacterota is not validly published and remains a candidate phylum. It was proposed by Williams et al. (2022) based on metagenome-assembled genomes (MAGs) from Ace Lake, a meromictic lake in Antarctica. The taxonomy includes four candidate classes, each containing novel genera and species identified from high-quality MAGs. Phylogenetic analyses place Auribacterota among the "microbial dark matter" phyla, distinct from well-characterized bacterial lineages.

The currently accepted taxonomy is based on the List of Prokaryotic names with Standing in Nomenclature (LPSN) and National Center for Biotechnology Information (NCBI).

120 marker proteins based GTDB 11-RS232

- - - - "Auribacteria"
        - "Auribacterales"
          - "Auribacteraceae"
            "Ca. Auribacter fodinae" Williams et al. 2022
    - - "Ancaeobacteria"
        - "Ancaeobacterales"
          - "Ancaeobacteraceae"
            "Ca. Ancaeobacter aquaticus" Williams et al. 2022
      - JACPWU01
        - "Theseobacterales"
          - "Theseobacteraceae"
            "Ca. Theseobacter exili" Williams et al. 2022
  - - "Tritonobacteria"
      - "Tritonobacterales"
        - "Tritonobacteraceae"
          "Ca. Tritonobacter lacicola" Williams et al. 2022
    - "Erginobacteria"
      - "Erginobacterales"
        - "Erginobacteraceae"
          - "Ca. Erginobacter occultus" Williams et al. 2022
          - "Ca. Euphemobacter frigidus" Williams et al. 2022

== See also ==
- List of bacterial orders
- List of bacteria genera
