= Balneolales =

Scientific classification
- Domain: Bacteria
- Kingdom: Pseudomonadati
- Phylum: Balneolota; Hahnke et al. 2021
- Class: Balneolia; Munoz et al. 2017
- Order: Balneolales; Munoz et al. 2017

Families
- Balneolaceae; Cyclonatronaceae; "Natronogracilivirgulaceae"; Soortiaceae

Synonyms
- Balneolota; "Balneolaeota" Hahnke et al. 2016; "Balneolota" Garcia-Lopez et al. 2019

Family of bacteria

Balneolales is an order of bacteria.

== Phylogeny ==
The currently accepted taxonomy is based on the List of Prokaryotic names with Standing in Nomenclature (LPSN) and National Center for Biotechnology Information (NCBI).

16S rRNA based LTP_08_2023

- - - Soortiaceae Amoozegar et al. 2017
    - Cyclonatronaceae (incl. "Natronogracilivirgulaceae")
  - Balneolaceae

120 marker proteins based GTDB 10-RS226

- - - Cyclonatronaceae Zhilina et al. 2023
    - "Natronogracilivirgulaceae" Zhilina, Toshchakov & Kublanov 2018
  - Balneolaceae Xia et al. 2016
