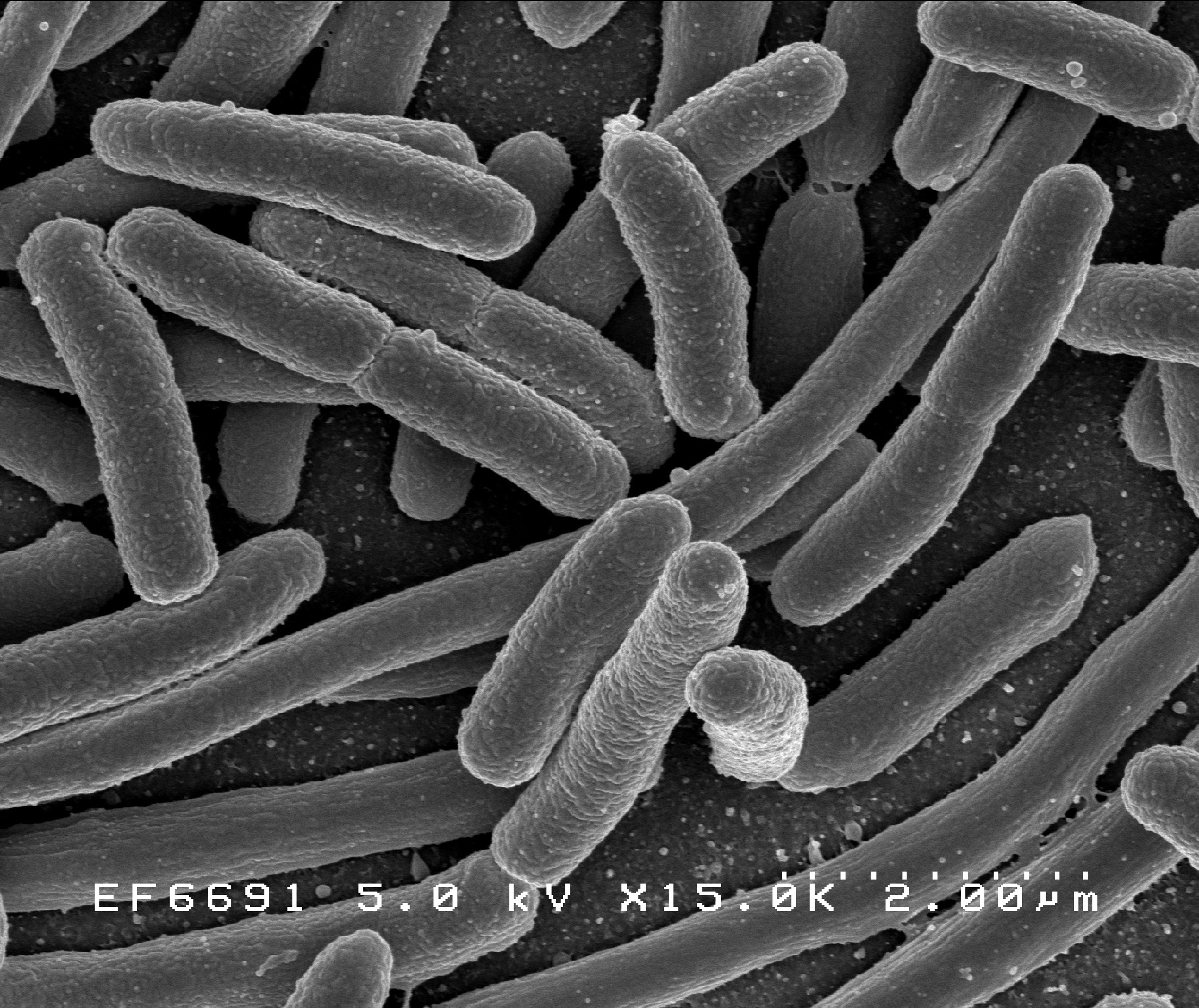
- Escherichia coli cells magnified 25,000 times

Scientific classification
- Domain: Bacteria
- Kingdom: Pseudomonadati (Gibbons & Murray 1978) Oren & Göker 2024

Type genus
- Pseudomonas Migula 1894 (Approved Lists 1980)

Phyla
- Abditibacteriota; Acidobacteriota; Aquificota; Atribacterota; Bacteroidota; Balneolota; Caldifarciminota; Caldisericota; Calditrichota; Chlamydiota; Chlorobiota; Chrysiogenota; "Cloacimonadota"; Coprothermobacterota; Deferribacterota; Dictyoglomerota; Elusimicrobiota; Fibrobacterota; Gemmatimonadota; Kiritimatiellota; "Latescibacterota"; Lentisphaerota; Myxococcota; Nitrospinota; Nitrospirota; Planctomycetota; Pseudomonadota; Rhodothermota; Spirochaetota; Thermodesulfobacteriota; Thermomicrobiota; Verrucomicrobiota; "Zhuqueibacterota"

Synonyms
- "Hydrobacteria" Battistuzzi & Hedges, 2009; "Hydrobacterida" Luketa 2012

= Pseudomonadati =

Kingdom of bacteria

Pseudomonadati is a prokaryotic kingdom containing approximately one-third of prokaryote species, mostly gram-negative bacteria and their relatives. The grouping was originally proposed under the name "Hydrobacteria".

Hydrobacteria is the closest relative of an even larger kingdom of Bacteria, the Bacillati ("Terrabacteria"), which are mostly gram-positive bacteria. Pseudomonadati and Bacillati were inferred to have diverged approximately 3 billion years ago, suggesting that land (continents) had been colonized by prokaryotes at that time.

== Names ==
The synonymous name "Hydrobacteria" (hydro = "water") refers to the moist environment inferred for the common ancestor of those species. In contrast, species of Bacillati ("Terrabacteria") possess adaptations for life on land. Since 2024, the only validly published name for this group is kingdom Pseudomonadati (there used to be none, because no levels above phylum could exist in earlier versions of the Prokaryotic Code).

"Gracilicutes," which was described in 1978 by Gibbons and Murray, is sometimes used in place of Pseudomonadati. However, "Gracilicutes" included Cyanobacteria (a member of Bacillati) and was not constructed under the now generally accepted three-domain system. More recently, a redefinition of "Gracilicutes" was proposed but it did not include a molecular phylogeny or statistical analyses. Also, it did not follow the three-domain system, claiming instead that the lineage of eukaryotes + Archaea is nested within Bacteria as a close relative of Actinomycetota, a tree not supported in any molecular phylogeny.

== Phylogeny and taxonomy ==
They include these superphyla and phyla: Acidobacteriota, Aquificota, Bdellovibrionota, Campylobacterota, Deferribacterota, Dependentiae, Desulfobacterota, Desulfuromonadota, Elusimicrobiota, FCB superphylum, Myxococcota, Nitrospirota, Proteobacteria, PVC superphylum, and Spirochaetota.

Some unrooted molecular phylogenetic analyses have not supported this dichotomy of Bacillati and Pseudomonadati, but the most recent genomic analyses, including those that have focused on rooting the tree, have found these two groups to be monophyletic.

Together, Pseudomonadati and Bacillati form a large clade containing 97% of prokaryotes and 99% of all species of Bacteria known by 2009, and placed by Battistuzzi and Hedges in the proposed taxon Selabacteria, in allusion to their phototrophic abilities (Greek σέλας = light). Currently, the bacterial phyla that are outside of Pseudomonadati + Bacillati, and thus justifying the taxon Selabacteria, are debated and may or may not include Fusobacteria.

The definition of two major divisions within the domain Bacteria, Pseudomonadati, and Bacillati, has come largely from rooted phylogenetic analyses of genomes. Unrooted analyses have not fully supported this division, drawing attention to the importance of rooted trees of life.

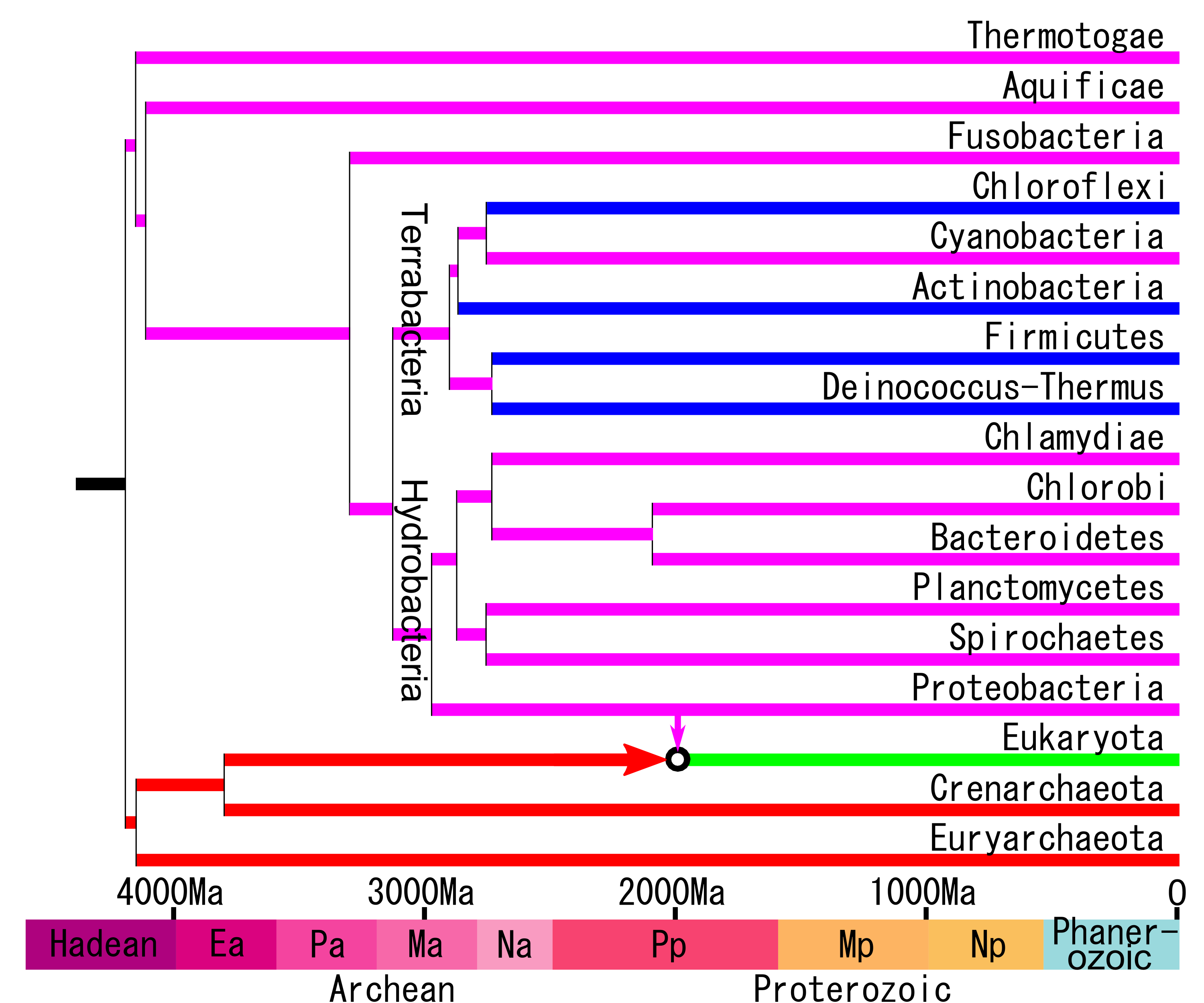
A timetree redrawn from Battistuzzi and Hedges (2009) shows the division of Pseudomonadati (syn. "Hydrobacteria") and Bacillati (syn. "Terrabacteria").

The two recent analyses of bacterial phylogeny both supported the division of Pseudomonadati and Bacillati. However, they interpreted the evolution of the cell wall differently, with one concluding that the last common ancestor of Bacteria was a monoderm (gram-positive bacteria) and the other concluding that it was a diderm (gram-negative bacteria). The following tree is redrawn from one of those two recent studies, showing the phylogeny of bacterial phyla and superphyla, with the position of Fusobacteria being unresolved and DST being the closest relative of Bacillati:

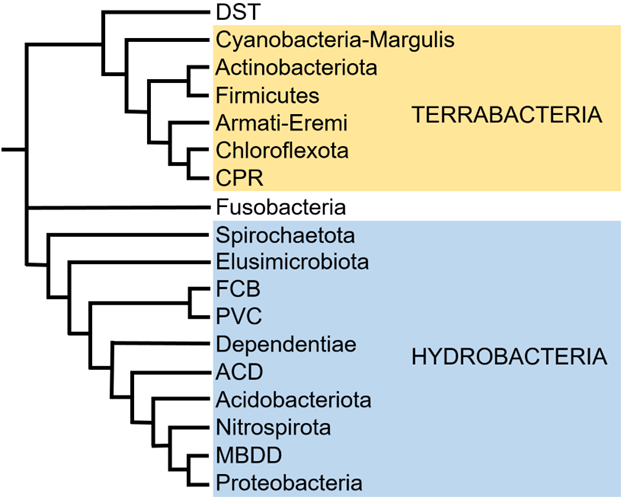
A phylogeny of bacterial phyla and superphyla according to Coleman et al. (2021). Pseudomonadati was referred to as "Gracilicutes" in that study.

The currently accepted taxonomy is based on the List of Prokaryotic names with Standing in Nomenclature (LPSN) and National Center for Biotechnology Information (NCBI).

16S rRNA based LTP_07_2026

- - Minisyncoccota
  - - - - - - Bacteriovoracia
            - - Abditibacteriota
              - Armatimonadota
          - - Oligoflexia
            - - Thermodesulfobiota
              - Thermotogota
        - - - Bradymonadia
            - - - "Fervidibacterota"
                - Thermoflexia
              - - Coprothermobacterota
                - Aquificota
          - - - Syntrophorhabdia
              - Atribacterota
            - - Elusimicrobiota
              - Deinococcota
      - - - Brevinematia
          - - Myxococcota
            - "Desulfuromonadota"
        - - Cyanobacteriota [incl. Vampirovibrionia]
          - - Thermodesulfovibrionia
            - Bacillota [incl. Desulfuribacillia; Erysipelotrichia]
    - - - - - - "Desulfatigladia"
              - "Leptospirillaeota"
            - Acidobacteriota
          - - Polyangiia
            - - Chlamydiota
              - - - Kiritimatiellota
                  - Lentisphaerota
                - Verrucomicrobiota
        - - - - Desulfomonilia
              - Syntrophia
            - Chloroflexota
          - - Desulfobacterota
            - - Planctomycetota
              - Actinomycetota
      - - - - Bdellovibrionota
            - - - Thermosulfidibacterota
                - Thermodesulfobacteriota
              - "Desulfovibrionota"
          - - Deltaproteobacteria~ [incl. Desulfobaccia; Dissulfuribacteria; Desulfarculia; Syntrophobacteria; Desulfobulbia]
            - - "Clostridiota"
              - - Chlorobiota [incl. Ignavibacteria]
                - - Balneolota
                  - - Rhodothermota
                    - Bacteroidota
        - - - - - Caldisericota
                - Vulcanimicrobiota
              - Gemmatimonadota
            - - Fusobacteriota
              - - Synergistota
                - Spirochaetota
          - - - Deferrisomatota
              - - - - Chrysiogenota
                    - Deferribacterota
                  - Campylobacterota
                - "Alphaproteobacteriota"
            - - - - Fidelibacterota
                  - Calditrichota
                - Fibrobacterota
              - Chromatibacteria [incl. Betaproteobacteria, Gammproteobacteria, Zetaproteobacteria, Magnetococcia]

120 marker proteins based GTDB 11-RS232

- Pseudomonadati
  - "Muiribacteriota" [incl. "Riflebacteria", "Wallbacteria"]
  - - - - "Macinerneyibacteriota"
        - "Sumerlaeota"
      - - - "Lindowbacteria"
          - "Salsurabacteriota" [DAL-3Gt_29_1_96C5R]
        - Spirochaetota
    - - - - - "Poribacteriota"
            - "Oederibacteriota" [incl. "Firestoneibacteriota"; "Goldiibacteriota"; "Muellerivitota"]
          - - - - "Aerophobota"
                - Atribacterota [incl. "Caldatribacteriota"]
              - - "Desantisiibacteriota"
                - - "Ryujiniota"
                  - Elusimicrobiota
            - - "Ratteibacteriota"
              - "Omnitrophota"
        - - "Planctochlora"
            - - "Planctobacteria"
                - - "Abyssobacterota"
                  - "Hydrogenedentota"
                - - Planctomycetota [incl. "Saltatorellota"]
                  - - "Auribacterota"
                    - - Chlamydiota
                      - Verrucomicrobiota [incl. Kiritimatiellota; Lentisphaerota]
            - - "FCB group"
                ⊞
                ⊟
                - - "Hinthialibacterota" (OLB16)
                  - "Tangaroaeota" (RBG-13-66-14; Coatesbacteria)
                - - - - - "Edwardsiibacteriota"
                        - Caldifarciminota [incl. "Hydrothermota"; "Caldipriscota"; "Stahliibacteriota" ]
                      - - "Fermentibacterota" [incl. "Aegiribacterota"]
                        - "Cloacimonadota"
                    - - - - "Arandabacterota"
                          - "Orphanbacterota"
                        - - "Eiseniibacteriota"
                          - - "Joyebacterota" [incl. "Effluvivivacota"]
                            - "Krumholzibacteriota" [incl. "Delphinibacteriota"]
                      - - Gemmatimonadota [incl. "Glassiibacteriota"]
                        - - "Latescibacterota" [incl. "Handelsmaniibacteriota"]
                          - - "Blakebacterota"
                            - - "Zixiibacteriota"
                              - - - "Delongiibacteriota" (UBA4055)
                                  - Fibrobacterota [incl. "Raymondiibacteriota"]
                                - - "Electryoneota" (AABM5-125-24)
                                  - - Fidelibacterota [incl. "Marinisomatota"]
                                    - - "Zhuqueibacterota" [incl. "Cosmopoliota"]
                                      - - Calditrichota
                                        - Bacteroidota [incl. Chlorobiota; Balneolota; Ignavibacteriota; "Kapaibacteriota"; "Kryptoniota"; Rhodothermota]
      - - "Proteobacteria"
          ⊞
          ⊟
          - Acidobacteriota [incl. "Aminicenantota"; "Fischeribacteriota"]
          - - - - "Aquificida"
                  - "Acidulodesulfobacteriota" (sic) (SZUA-79)
                  - - - Calescibacterota
                      - "Dadaibacteriota" (Desulfobacterota_D)
                    - - Desulfurellia {Campylobacterota_A}
                      - - Thermosulfidibacterota
                        - Aquificota
              - - - - "Lernaellota" (FEN-1099)
                    - Myxococcota
                  - - Bdellovibrionota
                    - - - "Lambdaproteobacteria" {SAR324}
                        - "Oligoflexaeota"
                      - Myxococcota_A
                - - - - - "Moduliflexota"
                        - "Methylomirabilota" [incl. "Rokuibacteriota"]
                      - - "Schekmaniibacteriota"
                        - - - "Spongiamicota"
                            - "Tectimicrobiota"
                          - Nitrospinota
                    - Nitrospirota [incl. "Leptospirillaeota" (sic)]
                  - Thermodesulfobacteriota [incl. Desulfobacterota; "Desulfuromonadota"; "Binatota"; "Deferrisomatota"; "Deferrimicrobiota"; "Desulfovibrionota"; "Tharpellota"]
            - - "Babelota"
              - - - Chrysiogenota [incl. Deferribacterota]
                  - Campylobacterota
                - Pseudomonadota (s.s.) [incl. "Alphaproteobacteria"; "Chromatibacteria"]

Unassigned phyla:

- "Canglongiota" Zhang et al. 2022
- "Heilongiota" Zhang et al. 2022
- "Nitrosediminicolota" Zhao, Jorgensen & Babbin 2024
- "Tianyaibacteriota" corrig. Cui et al. 2021

== See also ==
- List of bacterial orders
- List of bacteria genera
