= Mimosinase =

Class of enzymes

Identifiers
- EC no.: 4.3.3.8
- CAS no.: 104118-49-2

Databases
- BRENDA: enzyme data
- ExPASy: NiceZyme view
- KEGG: enzyme entry
- MetaCyc: metabolic pathway
- Rhea: reactions
- PDB structures: RCSB PDB PDBe PDBsum
- Gene Ontology: AmiGO / QuickGO
Search
- PMC: articles
- PubMed: articles
- NCBI: proteins

Mimosinase (EC 4.3.3.8) is an enzyme characterised from Leucaena leaves that catalyzes the overall chemical reaction which converts mimosine to 3-hydroxypyridin-4(1H)-one (a tautomer of 3,4-dihydroxypyridine), pyruvic acid, and ammonia:

mimosine
H_{2}O
NH_{3}
3-hydroxypyridin-4(1H)-one
+
pyruvic acid

The enzyme contains pyridoxal phosphate and the first step of the reaction breaks the bond between the pyridinone nitrogen and the sidechain, which at first forms an unstable enamine derivative. This is then hydrolysed to pyruvic acid and ammonia.

This enzyme is a carbon-nitrogen lyase.

== Occurrence ==
Known to occur in all Leucaena and Mimosa species of plant. The synthase found in L. leucocephala has been cloned.
