= Beta-(1-pyrazolyl)alanine synthase =

Beta-(1-pyrazolyl)alanine synthase may refer to either:

- Beta-pyrazolylalanine synthase, an enzyme
- Pyrazolylalanine synthase, an enzyme
