= L. salvadorensis =

L. salvadorensis may refer to:

- Leucaena salvadorensis, a plant species found in El Salvador, Honduras and Nicaragua
- Lonchocarpus salvadorensis, the Sangre de Chucho, a plant species
