= Guaje =

Guaje may refer to:

- David Villa, Spanish former footballer nicknamed "El Guaje" ("the Kid")
- Beans of trees in the genus Leucaena (especially spp. esculenta, leucocephala) which are commonly eaten in parts of Mexico, also known as leadtree or river tamarind
