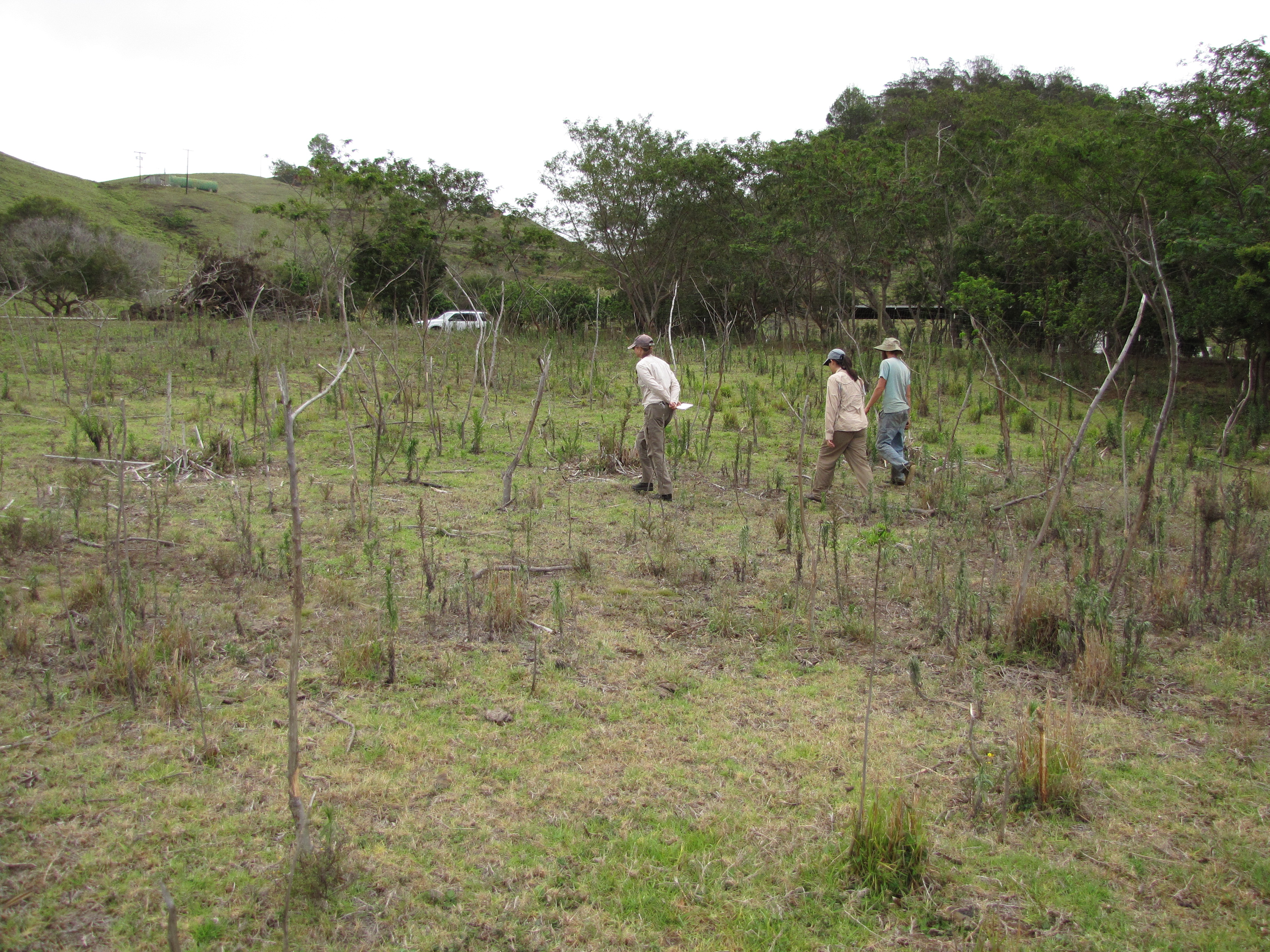
- Mature trees and grazed saplings in Hawaii
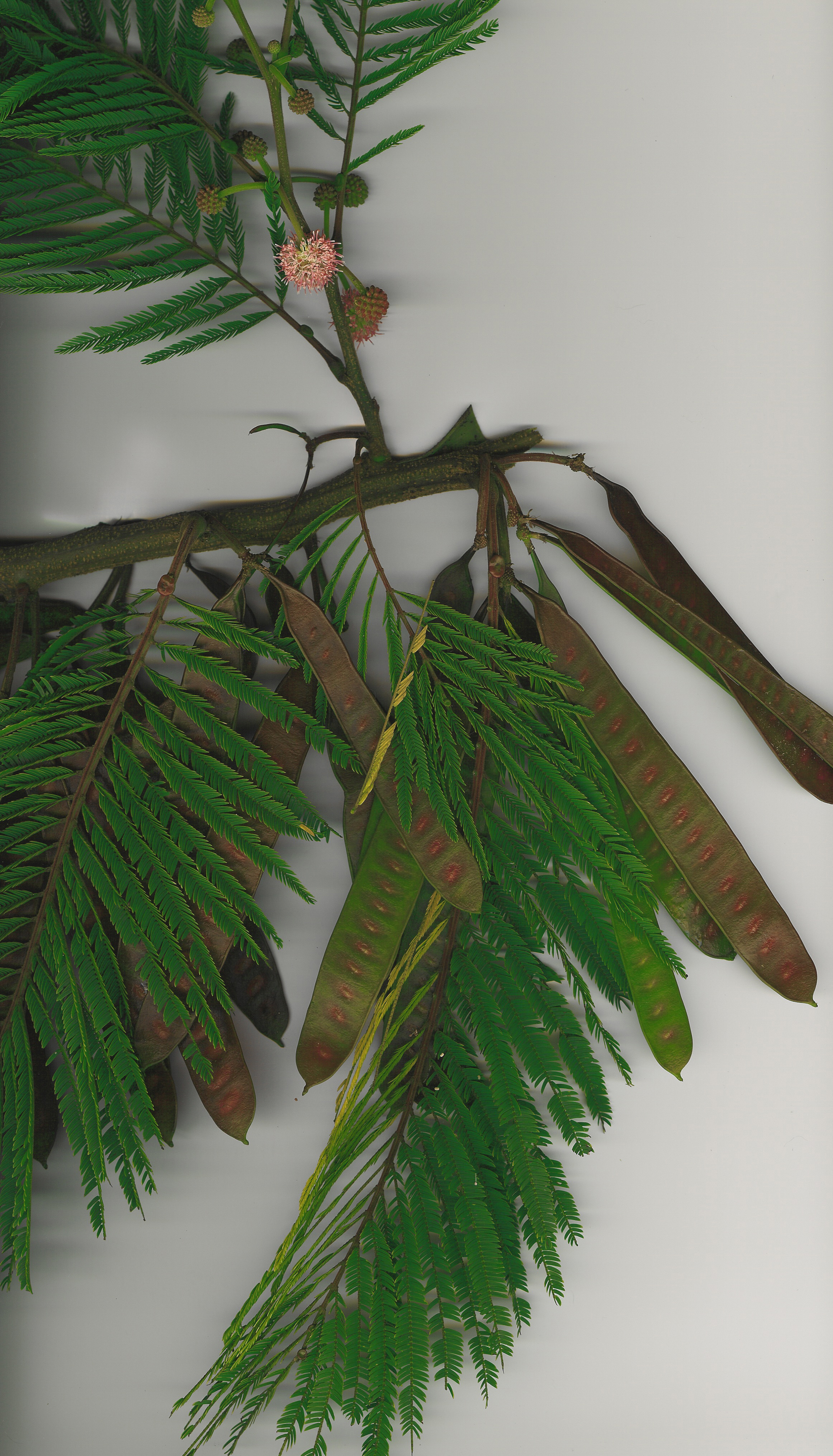
- Branch with flowers and seedpods

Conservation status
- Least Concern (IUCN 3.1)

Scientific classification
- Kingdom: Plantae
- Clade: Embryophytes
- Clade: Tracheophytes
- Clade: Angiosperms
- Clade: Eudicots
- Clade: Rosids
- Order: Fabales
- Family: Fabaceae
- Subfamily: Caesalpinioideae
- Clade: Mimosoid clade
- Genus: Leucaena
- Species: L. diversifolia

Binomial name
- Leucaena diversifolia (Schltdl.) Benth.

Synonyms
- Acacia diversifolia Schltdl.; Leucaena brachycarpa Urb.; Leucaena laxifolia Urb.

= Leucaena diversifolia =

Species of flowering plant

Leucaena diversifolia, the wild tamarind or red leucaena, is a species of flowering plant in the family Fabaceae, native to Mexico and Guatemala. It has been introduced as a cattle fodder in many tropical and subtropical locales around the world. It and its hybrid with Leucaena leucocephala are as aggressively invasive as L. leucocephala itself.
