= L-mimosine synthase =

Class of enzymes

Identifiers
- EC no.: 2.5.1.52
- CAS no.: 93229-75-5

Databases
- IntEnz: IntEnz view
- BRENDA: BRENDA entry
- ExPASy: NiceZyme view
- KEGG: KEGG entry
- MetaCyc: metabolic pathway
- PRIAM: profile
- PDB structures: RCSB PDB PDBe PDBsum
- Gene Ontology: AmiGO / QuickGO
Search
- PMC: articles
- PubMed: articles
- NCBI: proteins

L-mimosine synthase (EC 2.5.1.52) is an enzyme that catalyzes the chemical reaction

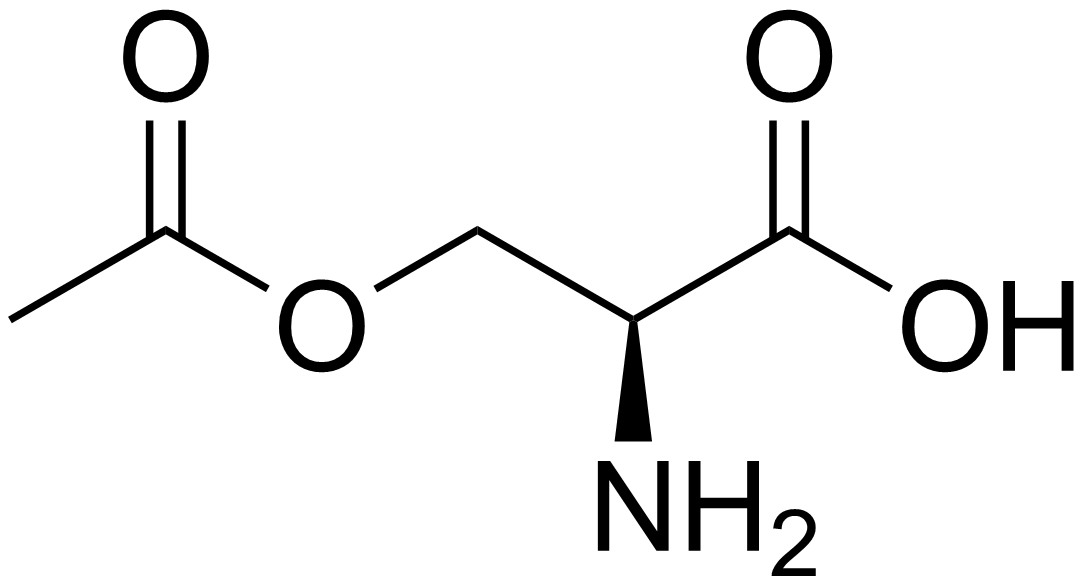
O-acetylserine
+
(1)
CH_{3}CO_{2}H
mimosine

The two substrates of this enzyme characterised from Leucaena leucocephala are O-acetylserine and 3,4-dihydroxypyridine (shown in its pyridin-4(1H)-one tautomer (1)). Its products are mimosine and acetic acid (CH_{3}CO_{2}H). The enzyme has a similar function to cysteine synthase and beta-pyrazolylalanine synthase from watermelon.

This enzyme is a transferase, specifically those transferring aryl or alkyl groups other than methyl groups. The systematic name of this enzyme class is O3-acetyl-L-serine:3,4-dihydroxypyridine 1-(2-amino-2-carboxyethyl)transferase. Other names in common use include O3-acetyl-L-serine acetate-lyase (adding 3,4-dihydroxypyridin-1-yl), 3-O-acetyl-L-serine:3,4-dihydroxypyridine, and 1-(2-amino-2-carboxyethyl)transferase.
