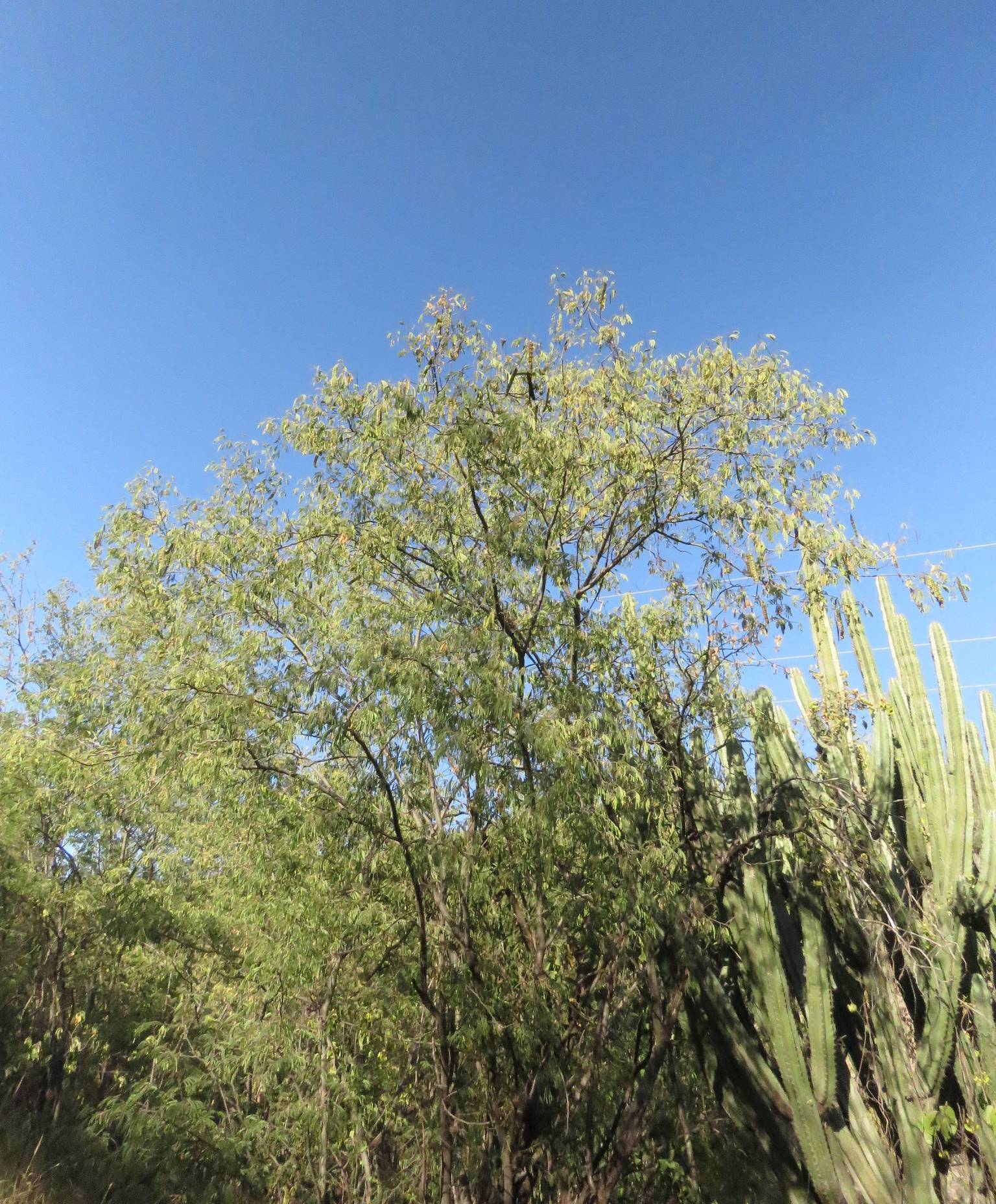

Conservation status
- Vulnerable (IUCN 3.1)

Scientific classification
- Kingdom: Plantae
- Clade: Tracheophytes
- Clade: Angiosperms
- Clade: Eudicots
- Clade: Rosids
- Order: Fabales
- Family: Fabaceae
- Subfamily: Caesalpinioideae
- Clade: Mimosoid clade
- Genus: Leucaena
- Species: L. cuspidata

Binomial name
- Leucaena cuspidata Standl.

= Leucaena cuspidata =

Species of legume

Leucaena cuspidata is a species of flowering plant in the family Fabaceae. It is found only in Mexico. It is threatened by habitat loss.
