= Leucaena greggii =

Conservation status
- Near Threatened (IUCN 3.1)

Scientific classification
- Kingdom: Plantae
- Clade: Tracheophytes
- Clade: Angiosperms
- Clade: Eudicots
- Clade: Rosids
- Order: Fabales
- Family: Fabaceae
- Subfamily: Caesalpinioideae
- Clade: Mimosoid clade
- Genus: Leucaena
- Species: L. greggii

Binomial name
- Leucaena greggii S.Watson

Species of legume

Leucaena greggii is a species of plant in the family Fabaceae. It is found only in Mexico. It is threatened by habitat loss. The species name greggii honors Josiah Gregg (1806–1850), a merchant, explorer, naturalist, and author of the American Southwest and Northern Mexico.
