= Mimosine =

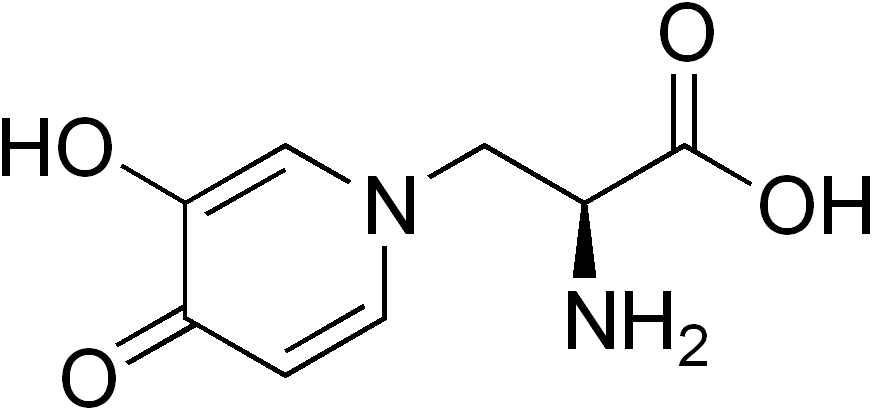

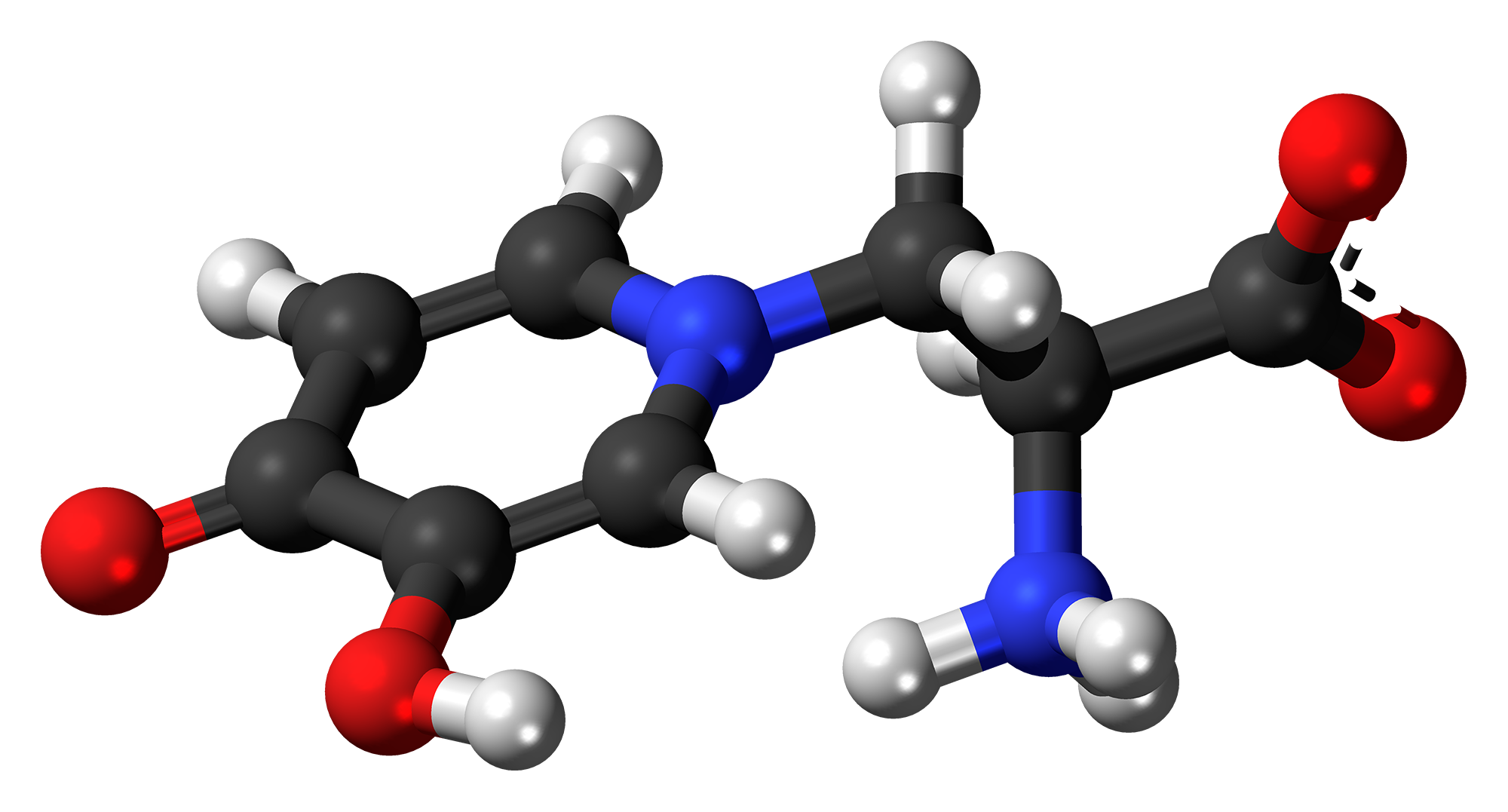

Names
- IUPAC name (2S)-2-Amino-3-(3-hydroxy-4-oxopyridin-1-yl)propanoic acid
- Other names leucenol

Identifiers
CAS Number	500-44-7
3D model (JSmol)	Interactive image
ChEBI	CHEBI:29063
ChEMBL	ChEMBL251433
ChemSpider	3728
DrugBank	DB01055
ECHA InfoCard	100.007.187
PubChem CID	3862
UNII	Z46B1LUI5N
CompTox Dashboard (EPA)	DTXSID401017244
- InChI: InChI=1S/C8H10N2O4/c9-5(8(13)14)3-10-2-1-6(11)7(12)4-10/h1-2,4-5,12H,3,9H2,(H,13,14) Key: WZNJWVWKTVETCG-UHFFFAOYSA-N
- SMILES: O=C(O)C(N)CN/1/C=C\C(=O)C(\O)=C\1

Properties
Chemical formula	C_{8}H_{10}N_{2}O_{4}
Molar mass	198.178 g·mol^{−1}
Melting point	291 °C (556 °F; 564 K)
- Except where otherwise noted, data are given for materials in their standard state (at 25 °C [77 °F], 100 kPa). Infobox references

Mimosine or leucenol is a toxic non-proteinogenic amino acid chemically similar to tyrosine. It occurs in some Mimosa spp. (including M. pudica) and all members of the closely related genus Leucaena.

This compound, also known as leucenol, was first isolated from the seeds of Leucaena glauca Benth., and was later investigated by Adams and coworkers.

== Properties ==
Mimosine melts with decomposition. The hydrochloride salt melts at 174.5–175.0 °C with decomposition; the hydrobromide decomposes at 179.5 °C, and the hydroiodide decomposes at 183–183.5 °C. Mimosine only forms monobasic acids, but the methyl ester forms a dihydrochloride, C_{7}H_{9}O_{2}N_{2}(COOMe)•2 HCl•½ H_{2}O, mp. 175–6 °C.

== Biosynthesis ==
In the final step in the biosynthesis of mimosine in Leucaena leucocephala, the enzyme L-mimosine synthase transfers a 2-amino-2-carboxyethyl group from O-acetylserine to 3-hydroxypyridin-4(1H)-one (1) with acetic acid (CH_{3}CO_{2}H) as a byproduct.

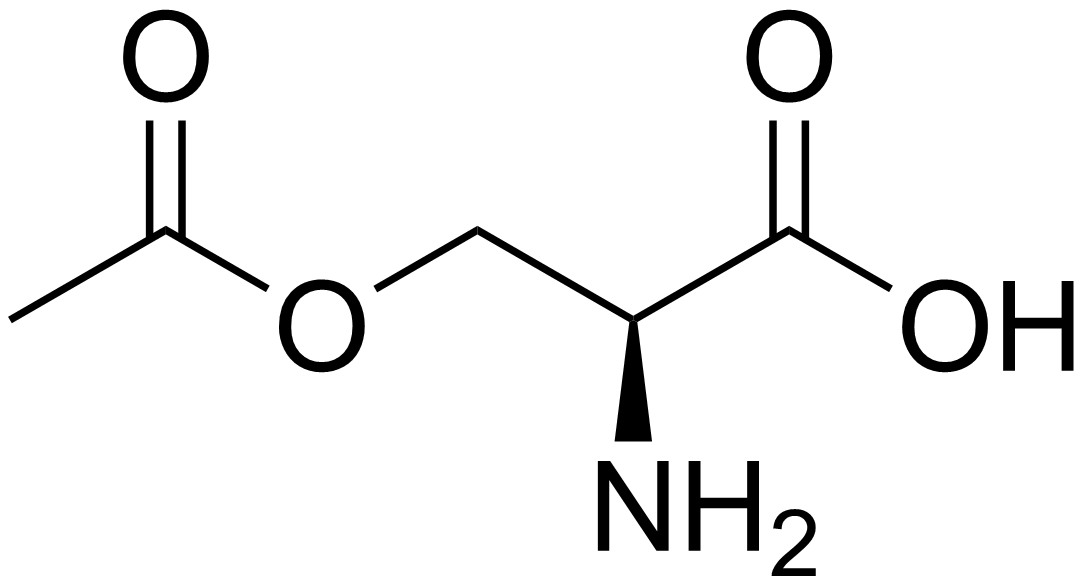
O-acetylserine
+
(1)
CH_{3}CO_{2}H
mimosine

== Biological effects ==
Mimosine arrests dividing cells in the late G1 phase by inhibiting DNA replication initiation. In ruminants, mimosine is degraded to 3,4- and 2,3-dihydroxypyridone (3,4- and 2,3-DHP).

Although toxicosis has occurred in Australia, Papua New Guinea, Africa and Florida, it has not been recorded in any other tropical and subtropical regions. Goats in Burma lost hair when fed a diet containing 50% of Leucaena. Goats and cattle in Hawaii are able to degrade the 3,4-DHP ruminally. Tolerance might be related to the presence or absence of microbes tolerant to mimosine and 3,4-DHP. It is known that at least Australian goats do not share the abilities of their Hawaiian counterparts.

Bickel and Wibaut found in feeding experiments with rats and mice that leucenol is probably the toxic constituent of Leucaena glauca seeds, but they did not observe with these animals the loss of hair that seems to occur when these seeds are fed to cattle. Aung from Myanmar isolated the new subspecies of Klebsiella pneumoniae that can degrade mimosine. Besides, Moe Thida Htun, from Myanmar also found another new sub-species of Bacillus aureus that can degrade mimosine.

Some rhizobia are known to produce rhizomimosinase, which consumes pyridoxal 5′-phosphate to degrade mimosine into 3,4 dihydroxypyridine, pyruvate, and ammonium. A similar enzyme, mimosinase, is produced by Leucaena leucocephala.

== See also ==
- Hordenine
- Meteloidine
