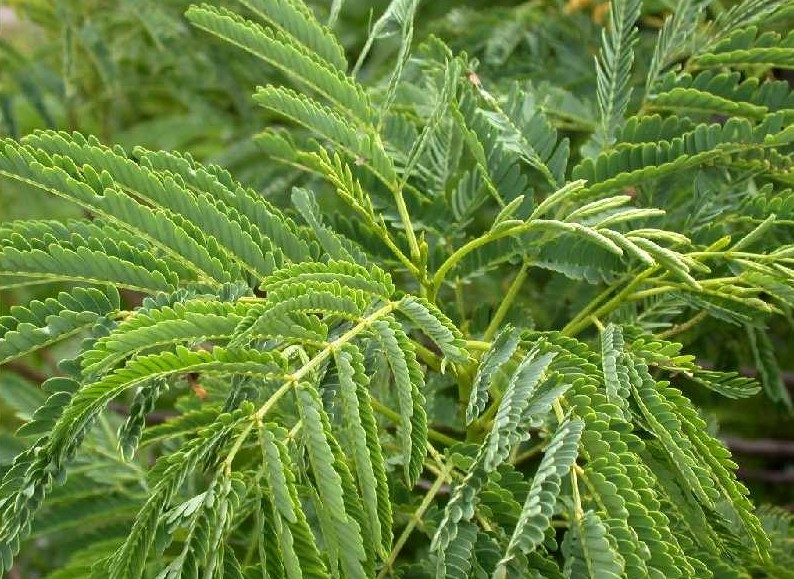

Scientific classification
- Kingdom: Plantae
- Clade: Tracheophytes
- Clade: Angiosperms
- Clade: Eudicots
- Clade: Rosids
- Order: Fabales
- Family: Fabaceae
- Subfamily: Caesalpinioideae
- Clade: Mimosoid clade
- Genus: Schleinitzia
- Species: S. fosbergii

Binomial name
- Schleinitzia fosbergii L.I.Nevling & Ch.J.Niezgoda

= Schleinitzia fosbergii =

Species of legume

Schleinitzia fosbergii is a species of flowering plant in the legume family known by the common name strand tangantangan. It is native to Guam and other islands in the Mariana Islands chain.

This plant is a large shrub generally growing up to 2 meters tall, sometimes becoming treelike and reaching 6 meters. The leaves are made up of a few pairs of pinnae, each of which is lined with several pairs of leaflets up to a centimeter long. The inflorescence is a small globular cluster of tiny white five-petaled flowers which may be bisexual or functionally male. The fruit is a hard, flattened, brown or black pod up to 11 centimeters long.

This plant grows at the coastline in maritime tropical climates. The temperature varies little. The most rainfall comes during July through October and annual precipitation usually amounts to 2000 to 2500 millimeters. There are typhoons most years. The plant grows on coastal strands, including oceanside cliffs, just beyond the high-tide mark. It receives heavy sea spray. It prefers well-drained alkaline substrates such as coral sands.

This species is uncommon and may have been displaced in some habitats by the introduced species Leucaena leucocephala.

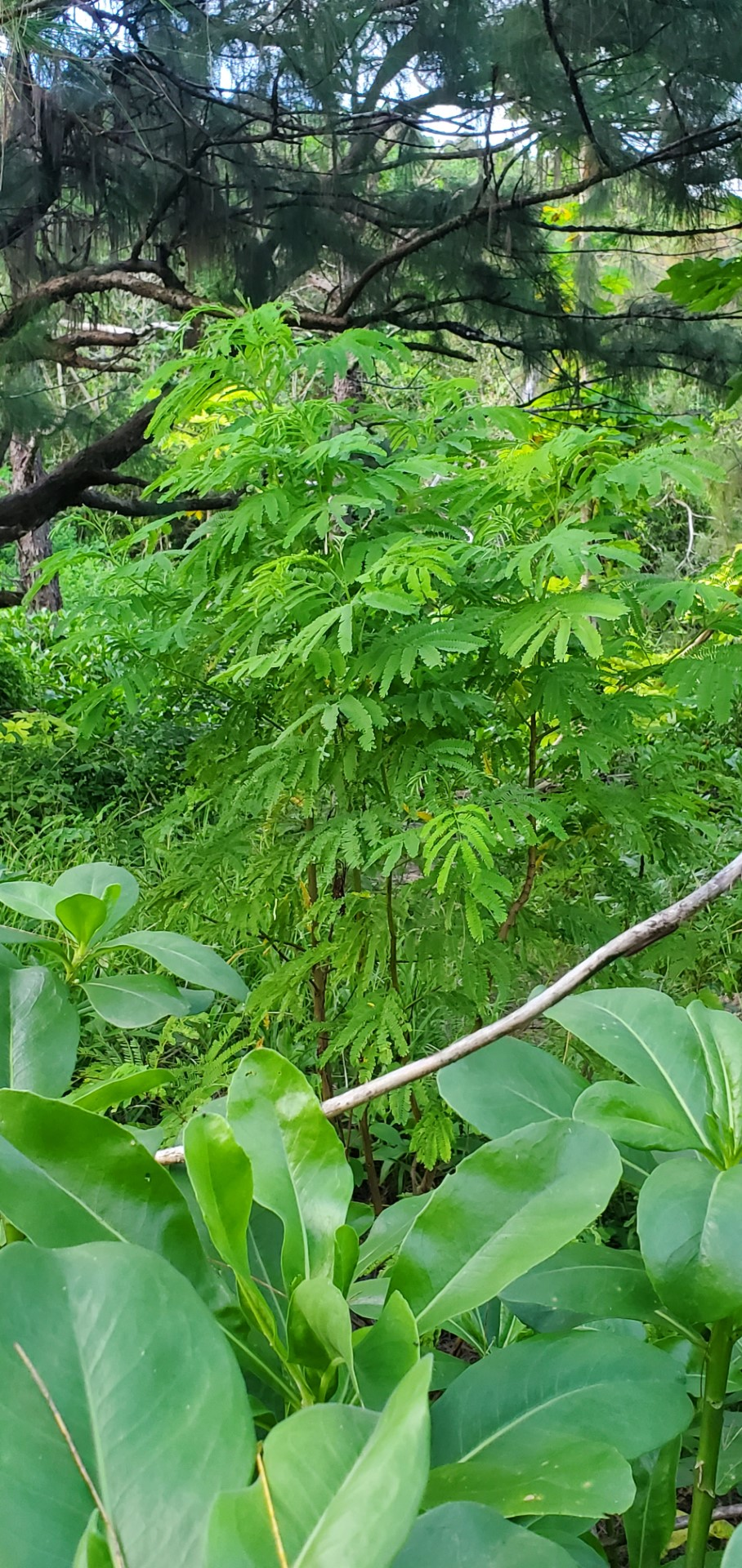
Schleinitzia fosbergii, Yigo, Guam, among Scaevola taccada and Casuarina equisetifolia on coastal limestone.

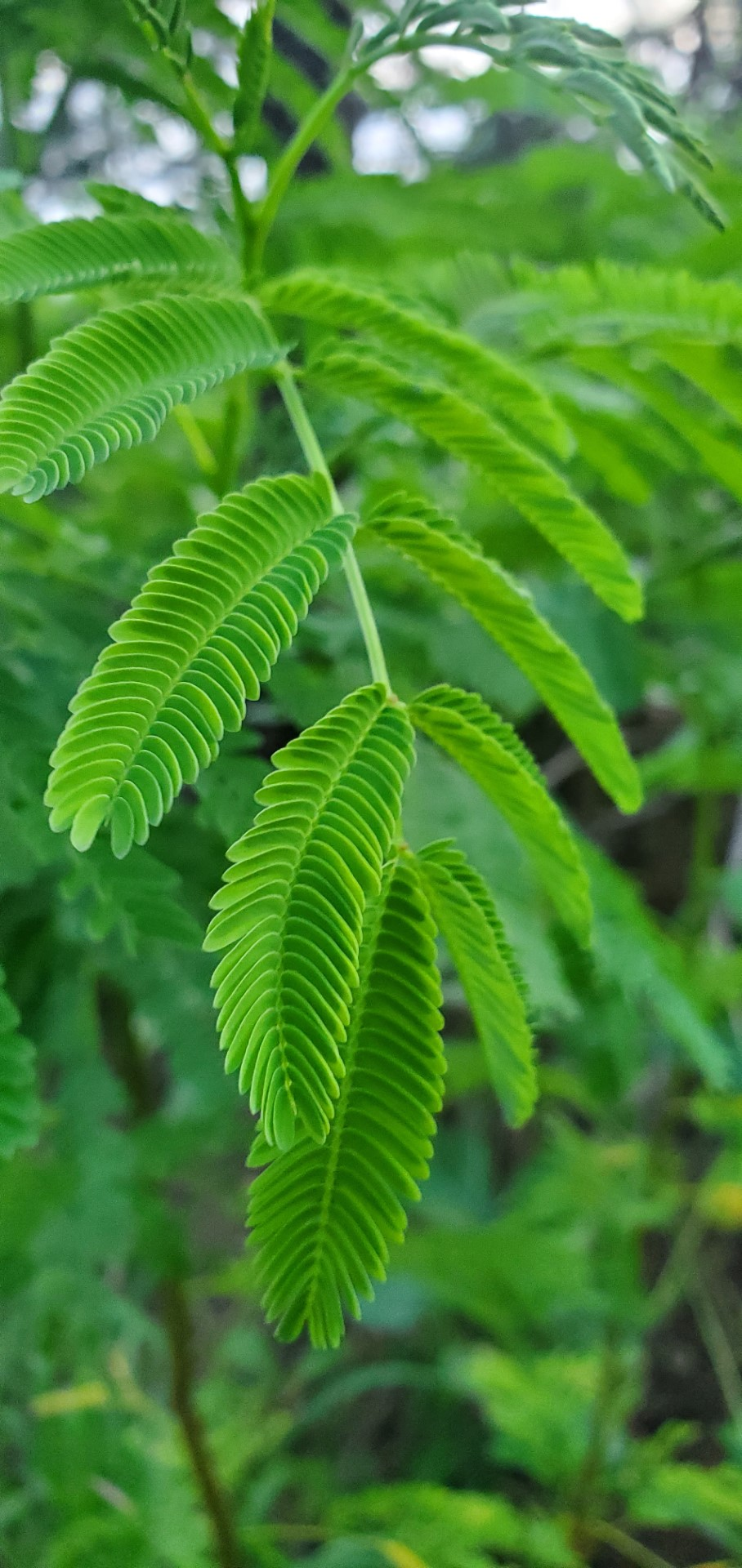
Schleinitzia fosbergii leaves, Yigo, Guam.

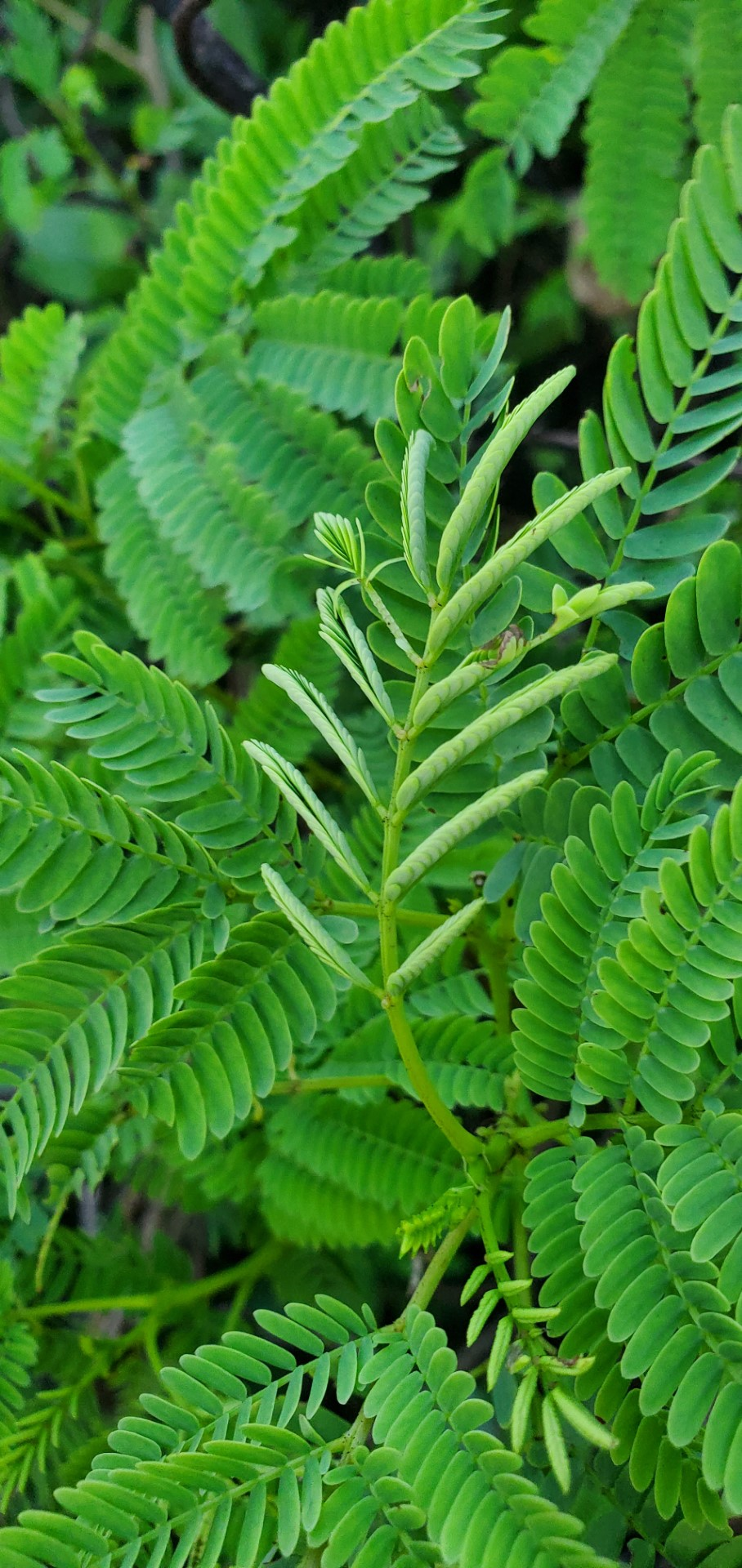
Schleinitzia fosbergii leaves closing in the evening, Yigo, Guam.

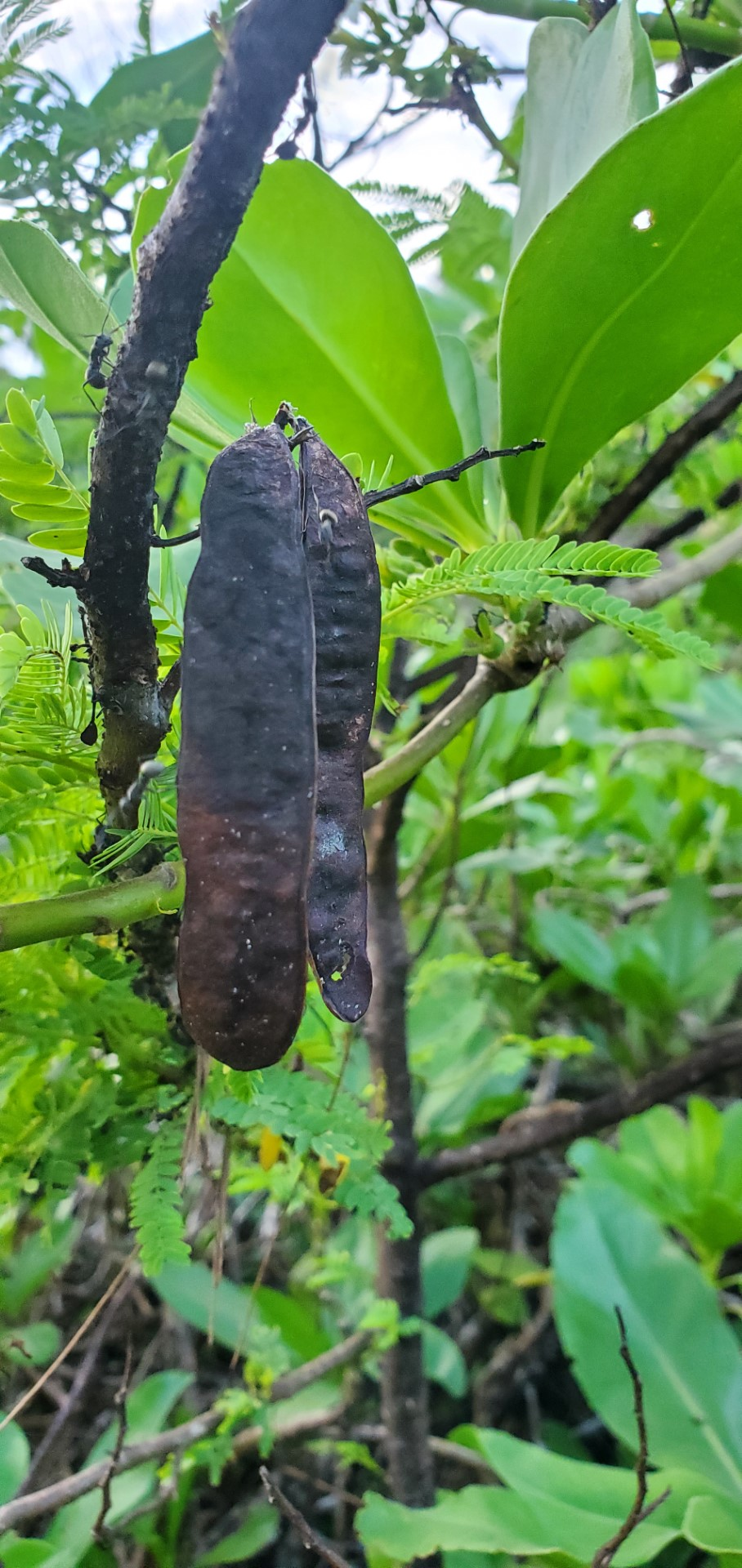
Schleinitzia fosbergii seed pods, Yigo, Guam

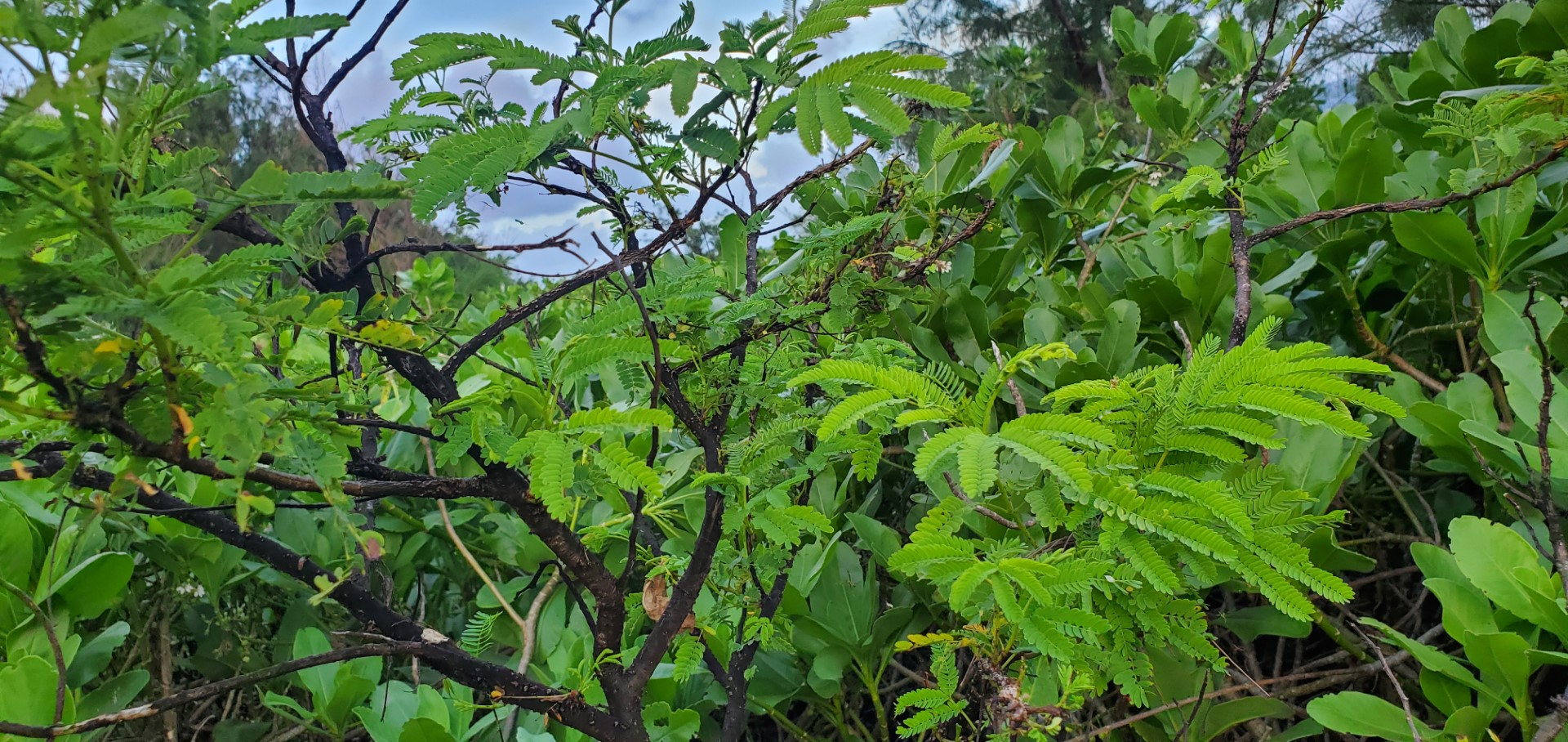
Schleinitzia fosbergii stems, Yigo Guam

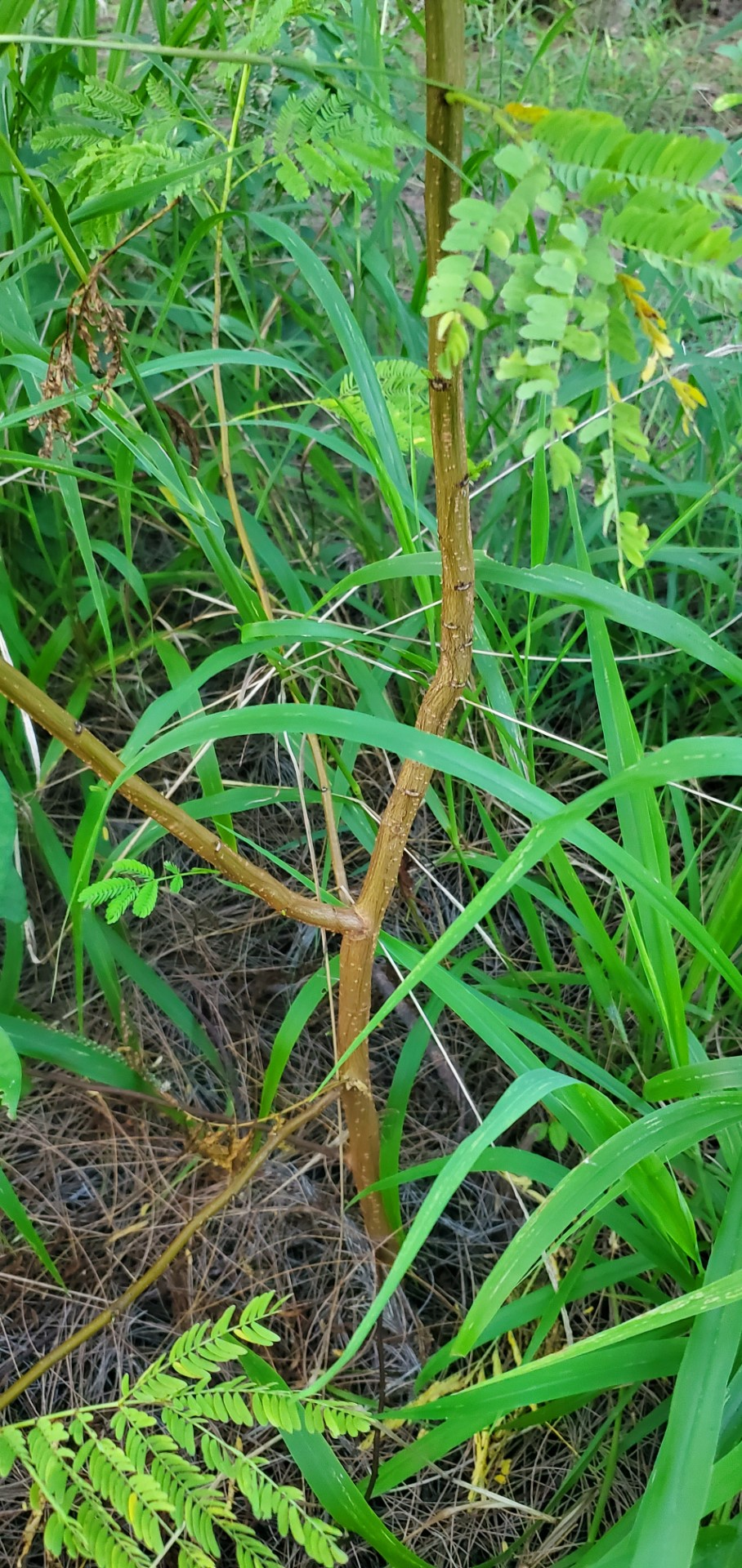
Schleinitzia fosbergii trunk, Yigo, Guam

== See also ==
- List of endemic plants in the Mariana Islands
