= Leucaena matudae =

Conservation status
- Endangered (IUCN 3.1)

Scientific classification
- Kingdom: Plantae
- Clade: Tracheophytes
- Clade: Angiosperms
- Clade: Eudicots
- Clade: Rosids
- Order: Fabales
- Family: Fabaceae
- Subfamily: Caesalpinioideae
- Clade: Mimosoid clade
- Genus: Leucaena
- Species: L. matudae

Binomial name
- Leucaena matudae (Zárate) C.E.Hughes

Synonyms
- Leucaena esculenta subsp. matudae Zárate

Species of legume

Leucaena matudae is an endangered species of plant in the family Fabaceae. It is a tree native to Guerrero state in southwestern Mexico.
