= Leucaena involucrata =

Conservation status
- Endangered (IUCN 3.1)

Scientific classification
- Kingdom: Plantae
- Clade: Tracheophytes
- Clade: Angiosperms
- Clade: Eudicots
- Clade: Rosids
- Order: Fabales
- Family: Fabaceae
- Subfamily: Caesalpinioideae
- Clade: Mimosoid clade
- Genus: Leucaena
- Species: L. involucrata

Binomial name
- Leucaena involucrata Zárate

Species of legume

Leucaena involucrata is a species of flowering plant in the family Fabaceae. It is endemic to Sonora state in northwestern Mexico.
