= Leucaena magnifica =

Conservation status
- Endangered (IUCN 3.1)

Scientific classification
- Kingdom: Plantae
- Clade: Tracheophytes
- Clade: Angiosperms
- Clade: Eudicots
- Clade: Rosids
- Order: Fabales
- Family: Fabaceae
- Subfamily: Caesalpinioideae
- Clade: Mimosoid clade
- Genus: Leucaena
- Species: L. magnifica

Binomial name
- Leucaena magnifica (C.E.Hughes) C.E.Hughes

Species of legume

Leucaena magnifica is a species of plant in the family Fabaceae. It is found only in Guatemala.
