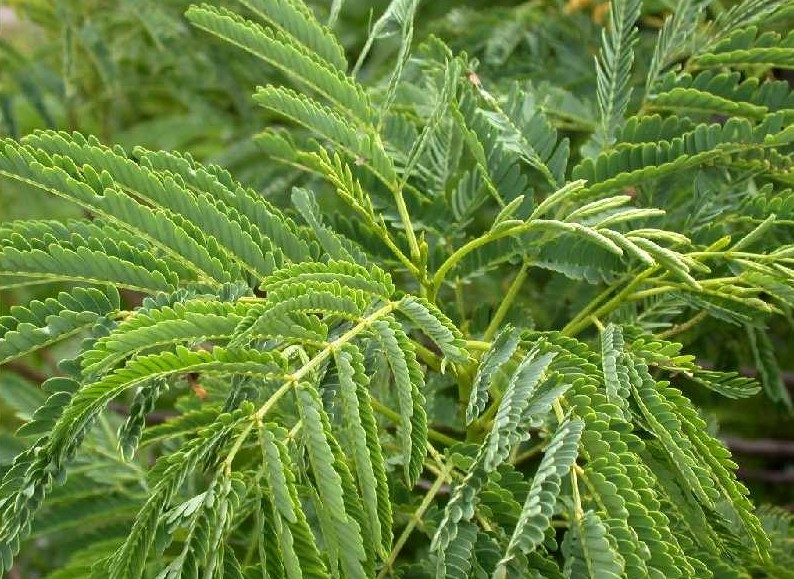
- Schleinitzia fosbergii

Scientific classification
- Kingdom: Plantae
- Clade: Tracheophytes
- Clade: Angiosperms
- Clade: Eudicots
- Clade: Rosids
- Order: Fabales
- Family: Fabaceae
- Subfamily: Caesalpinioideae
- Clade: Mimosoid clade
- Genus: Schleinitzia; Warb. ex Nevling & Niezgoda (1919)

Species
- four; see text

Synonyms
- Schleinitzia Warb. (1891), not accepted by the author.

= Schleinitzia =

Genus of legumes

Schleinitzia is a genus of flowering plants in the family Fabaceae. It includes four species of trees and shrubs native to the Philippines, New Guinea, and the South Pacific. Typical habitats include tropical secondary rain forest, woodland, wooded grassland, coastal plain, and beaches. It belongs to the mimosoid clade of the subfamily Caesalpinioideae.

== Species ==
- Schleinitzia fosbergii Nevling & Niezgoda
- Schleinitzia insularum (Guill.) Burkart
- Schleinitzia megaladenia (Merr.) P.Guinet & I.C.Nielsen
- Schleinitzia novoguineensis (Warb.) Verdc.
