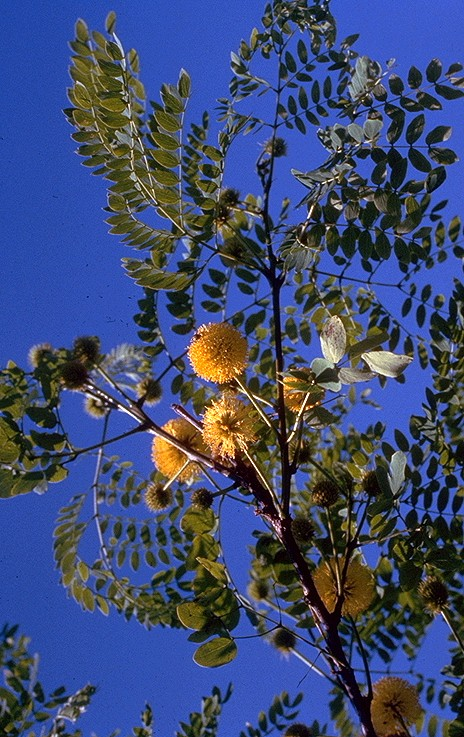

Conservation status
- Apparently Secure (NatureServe)

Scientific classification
- Kingdom: Plantae
- Clade: Embryophytes
- Clade: Tracheophytes
- Clade: Angiosperms
- Clade: Eudicots
- Clade: Rosids
- Order: Fabales
- Family: Fabaceae
- Subfamily: Caesalpinioideae
- Clade: Mimosoid clade
- Genus: Leucaena
- Species: L. retusa

Binomial name
- Leucaena retusa Benth.
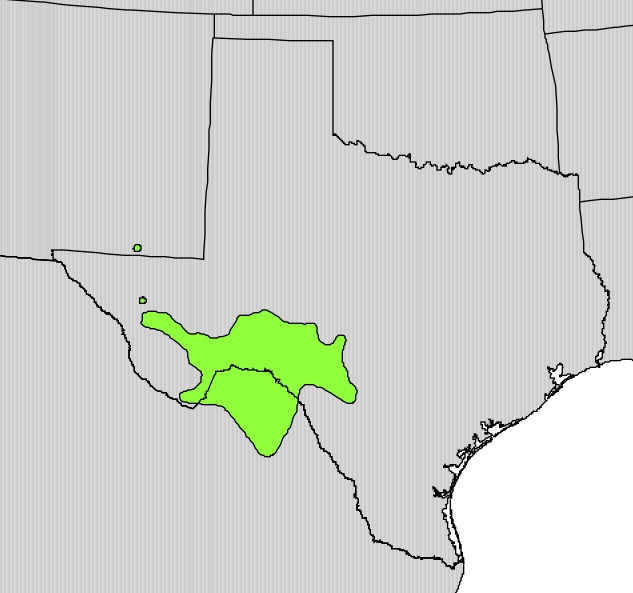
- Natural range

= Leucaena retusa =

Species of legume

Leucaena retusa is a species of flowering plant in the legume family known by the common names littleleaf leadtree, goldenball leadtree, wahoo tree, and lemonball. It is native to Chihuahua and Coahuila in Mexico and Texas in the United States. It also occurs in New Mexico.

This plant is a small tree that can reach 7.5 m (25 ft) in height. The leaves are bright green to blue-green in color and each is divided into several leaflets. The spherical flowers are yellow to white. The trees flower in April through October. They tend to flower profusely after rain. The fruit is a legume pod up to 25 cm (10 in) in length. The wood is weak and breaks easily.

This tree grows in dry habitat and is drought-tolerant. It is adapted to alkaline soils and full sunlight. It is often cultivated as an ornamental plant for its attractive appearance. It is easily grown from seed and it will reseed itself. It can even become weedy. It is not considered useful as a honey plant or for its wood.

Animals such as livestock and white-tailed deer find the herbage palatable. The seeds are also high in protein.
