= Leucaena pueblana =

Conservation status
- Vulnerable (IUCN 3.1)

Scientific classification
- Kingdom: Plantae
- Clade: Tracheophytes
- Clade: Angiosperms
- Clade: Eudicots
- Clade: Rosids
- Order: Fabales
- Family: Fabaceae
- Subfamily: Caesalpinioideae
- Clade: Mimosoid clade
- Genus: Leucaena
- Species: L. pueblana

Binomial name
- Leucaena pueblana Britton & Rose

Species of legume

Leucaena pueblana is a species of plant in the family Fabaceae. It is found only in Mexico. It is threatened by habitat loss.
