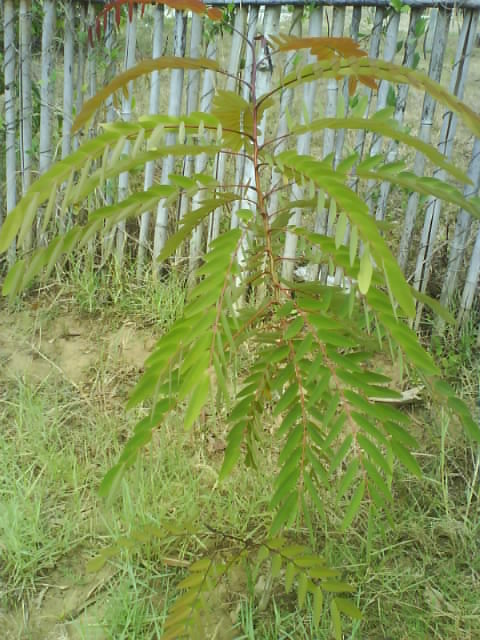

Conservation status
- Near Threatened (IUCN 3.1)

Scientific classification
- Kingdom: Plantae
- Clade: Tracheophytes
- Clade: Angiosperms
- Clade: Eudicots
- Clade: Rosids
- Order: Fabales
- Family: Fabaceae
- Subfamily: Caesalpinioideae
- Clade: Mimosoid clade
- Genus: Leucaena
- Species: L. salvadorensis

Binomial name
- Leucaena salvadorensis Standl. ex Britton & Rose

Synonyms
- Leucaena shannonii subsp. salvadorensis (Standl. ex Britton & Rose) Zárate in Ann. Missouri Bot. Gard. 74: 449 (1987)

= Leucaena salvadorensis =

Species of plant

Leucaena salvadorensis is a species of flowering plant in the family Fabaceae. It is found in the tropical parts of El Salvador, Honduras, and Nicaragua.

It was first published in N.L.Britton & al. (eds.), N. Amer. Fl. vol.23 (Issue 2) on page 125 in 1928.

== Habitat ==
It is found at an altitudes of 200–1,000 m (660–3,280 ft) above sea level.

== Uses ==
The wood of the tree is an excellent source of firewood because it is so dense and can be easily split and dried.

It is also a good source of local timber.

== Other sources ==
- Hellin JJ, Hughes CE. 1993. Leucaena salvadorensis: conservation and utilization in Central America. Serie Miscelanea de CONSERFORH 39-21/93.
- Hong TD, Linington S, Ellis RH. 1996. Seed storage behaviour: a compendium. Handbooks for Genebanks: No. 4. IPGRI.
- Hughes CE. 1998. Leucaena; a genetic resources handbook. Tropical forestry Papers No. 37. Oxford Forestry Institute, Department of Plant Sciences, University of Oxford and Department for International Development.
