= Beta-pyrazolylalanine synthase =

Class of enzymes

Identifiers
- EC no.: 2.5.1.51
- CAS no.: 37290-81-6

Databases
- IntEnz: IntEnz view
- BRENDA: BRENDA entry
- ExPASy: NiceZyme view
- KEGG: KEGG entry
- MetaCyc: metabolic pathway
- PRIAM: profile
- PDB structures: RCSB PDB PDBe PDBsum
- Gene Ontology: AmiGO / QuickGO
Search
- PMC: articles
- PubMed: articles
- NCBI: proteins

Beta-pyrazolylalanine synthase (EC 2.5.1.51) is an enzyme that catalyzes the chemical reaction

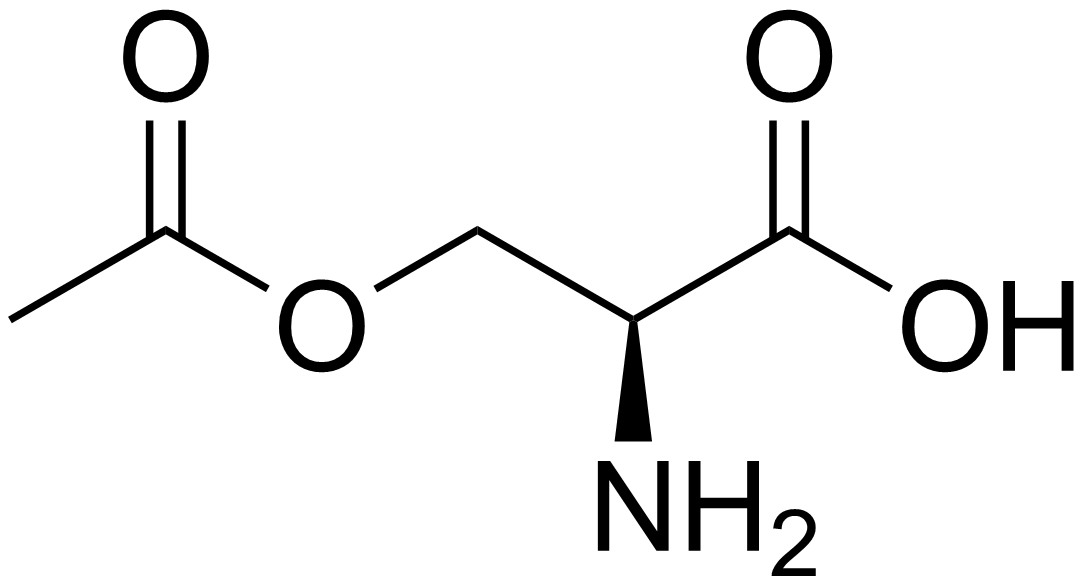
O-acetylserine
+
pyrazole
CH_{3}CO_{2}H
β-pyrazolyl-L-alanine

It was first characterised from Leucaena leucocephala and transfers the 2-amino-2-carboxyethyl group from its substrate, the amino acid O-acetylserine, to pyrazole, giving β-pyrazolyl-L-alanine. Acetic acid (CH_{3}CO_{2}H) is a byproduct. The enzyme is also found in Citrullus vulgaris (watermelon) and, unlike some other cysteine synthase enzymes which use O-acetylserine, in this species is specific for pyrazole.

This enzyme is a transferase, specifically those transferring aryl or alkyl groups other than methyl groups. The systematic name of this enzyme class is O3-acetyl-L-serine:pyrazole 1-(2-amino-2-carboxyethyl)transferase. Other names in common use include beta-(1-pyrazolyl)alanine synthase, beta-pyrazolealanine synthase, beta-pyrazolylalanine synthase (acetylserine), O3-acetyl-L-serine acetate-lyase (adding pyrazole), BPA-synthase, pyrazolealanine synthase, pyrazolylalaninase, and 3-O-acetyl-L-serine:pyrazole 1-(2-amino-2-carboxyethyl)transferase.
