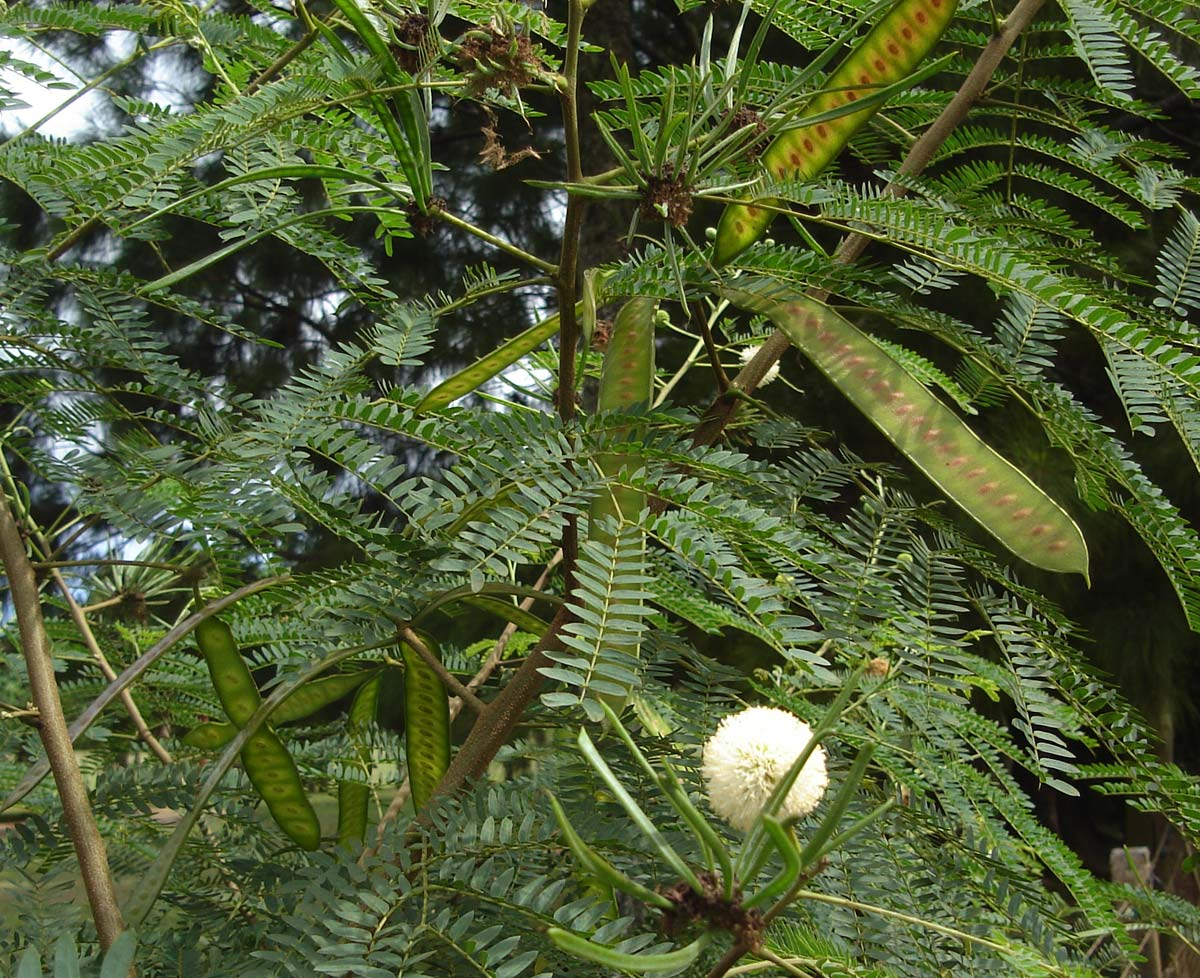
- Leucaena leucocephala

Scientific classification
- Kingdom: Plantae
- Clade: Tracheophytes
- Clade: Angiosperms
- Clade: Eudicots
- Clade: Rosids
- Order: Fabales
- Family: Fabaceae
- Subfamily: Caesalpinioideae
- Clade: Mimosoid clade
- Genus: Leucaena; Benth. (1842), nom. cons.

Type species
- Leucaena glauca Benth.

Species
- 24; see text

Synonyms
- Caudoleucaena Britton & Rose (1928); Ryncholeucaena Britton & Rose (1928)

= Leucaena =

Genus of legumes

Leucaena is a genus of flowering plants in the mimosoid clade of the subfamily Caesalpinioideae of the family Fabaceae. It contains about 24 species of trees and shrubs, which are commonly known as leadtrees. They are native to the Americas, ranging from Texas in the United States south to Peru. The generic name is derived from the Greek word λευκός (leukos), meaning "white", referring to the flowers.

== Uses ==
Leucaena species are grown for their variety of uses, including as green manure, a charcoal source, livestock fodder, and for soil conservation. The seeds (jumbie beans) can be used as beads. Leucaena planted for firewood on an area of 120 km^{2} (46 sq mi) will yield an energy equivalent of 1 million barrels of oil per year. Anthelmintic medicines are made from extracts of Leucaena seeds in Sumatra, Indonesia.

Some species (namely Leucaena leucocephala) have edible fruits (as unripe) and seeds. The seeds of Leucaena esculenta (in Mexico called guaje or huaje) are eaten with salt in Mexico. In other species high levels of mimosine may lead to hair loss and infertility in non-ruminants.

== Species ==
24 species are accepted:

- Leucaena collinsii Britton & Rose – Collins leadtree (Southern Mexico)
- Leucaena confertiflora Zárate
- Leucaena cruziana Britton & Rose
- Leucaena cuspidata Standl. (Mexico)
- Leucaena diversifolia (Schltdl.) Benth. – Diverseleaf leadtree (Southern Mexico, Central America)
- Leucaena esculenta (DC.) Benth. – Esculent leadtree (Mexican highlands)
- Leucaena greggii S.Watson (Mexico)
- Leucaena involucrata Zárate (Mexico)
- Leucaena lanceolata S.Watson (Western Mexico)
- Leucaena lempirana C.E.Hughes (Honduras)
- Leucaena leucocephala (Lam.) de Wit – White leadtree (Southern Mexico, Belize, Guatemala)
- Leucaena macrophylla Benth. – Bigleaf Leucaena (Lowland Mexico)
- Leucaena magnifica (C.E.Hughes) C.E.Hughes (Guatemala)
- Leucaena matudae (Zárate) C.E.Hughes (Mexico)
- Leucaena multicapitula Schery
- Leucaena pallida Britton & Rose
- Leucaena pueblana Britton & Rose (Mexico)
- Leucaena pulverulenta (Schltdl.) Benth. – Great leadtree (Southern Texas, Northeastern Mexico). It's known in Mexico as "tepeguaje" or "tepehuaje"
- Leucaena retusa Benth. – Littleaf leadtree (Western Texas, Northern Mexico)
- Leucaena salvadorensis Standl. ex Britton & Rose (El Salvador, Honduras, Nicaragua)
- Leucaena shannonii Donn.Sm. – Shannon leadtree (Southern Mexico, Central America)
- Leucaena trichandra (Zucc.) Urb. – Hairystamen leadtree (Southern Mexico, Central America)
- Leucaena trichodes (Jacq.) Benth. – Hairy leadtree (Southern Central America, Northwestern South America, Hispaniola)
- Leucaena zacapana (C.E.Hughes) R.Govind. & C.E.Hughes

=== Hybrids ===
- Leucaena × mixtec
- Leucaena × spontanea

=== Formerly placed here ===
- Acacia glauca (L.) Moench (as L. glauca (L.) Benth.)
- Lysiloma latisiliquum (L.) Benth. (as L. latisiliqua (L.) Gillis)
- Schleinitzia fosbergii Nevling & Niezgoda (as L. insularum var. guamensis Fosberg & B. C. Stone)
- Schleinitzia insularum (Guill.) Burkart (as L. insularum (Guill.) Däniker)
