= Pyrazolylalanine synthase =

pyrazolylalanine synthase

Identifiers
- EC no.: 4.2.1.50
- CAS no.: 37290-81-6

Databases
- IntEnz: IntEnz view
- BRENDA: BRENDA entry
- ExPASy: NiceZyme view
- KEGG: KEGG entry
- MetaCyc: metabolic pathway
- PRIAM: profile
- PDB structures: RCSB PDB PDBe PDBsum
- Gene Ontology: AmiGO / QuickGO
Search
- PMC: articles
- PubMed: articles
- NCBI: proteins

The enzyme pyrazolylalanine synthase (EC 4.2.1.50) catalyzes the chemical reaction

L-serine + pyrazole $\rightleftharpoons$ 3-(pyrazol-1-yl)-L-alanine + H_{2}O

This enzyme belongs to the family of lyases, specifically the hydro-lyases, which cleave carbon-oxygen bonds. The systematic name of this enzyme class is L-serine hydro-lyase [adding pyrazole 3-(pyrazol-1-yl)-L-alanine-forming]. Other names in common use include β-pyrazolylalaninase, β-(1-pyrazolyl)alanine synthase, and L-serine hydro-lyase (adding pyrazole). It employs one cofactor, pyridoxal phosphate.
