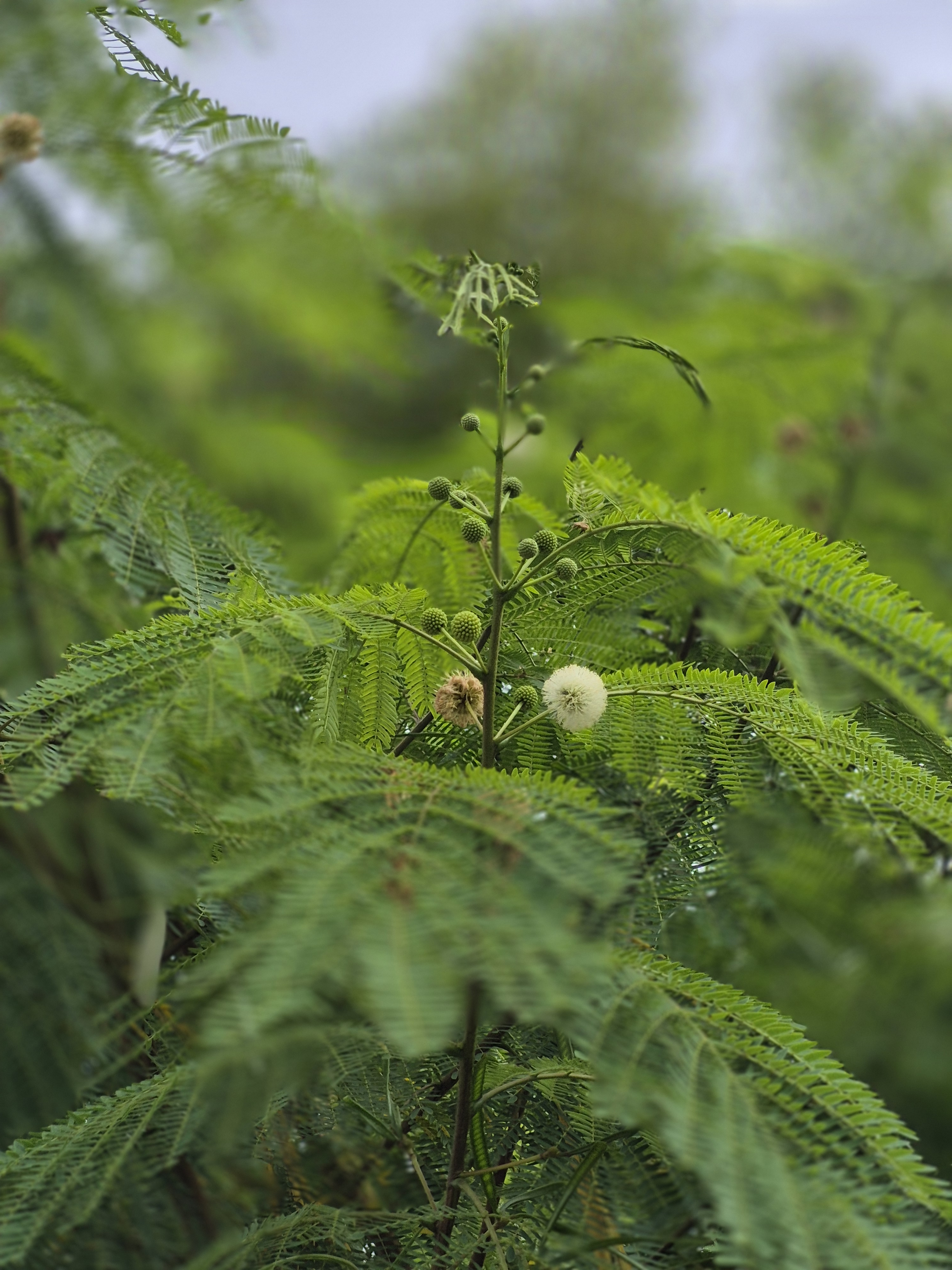
- Shrub in southern Brazil
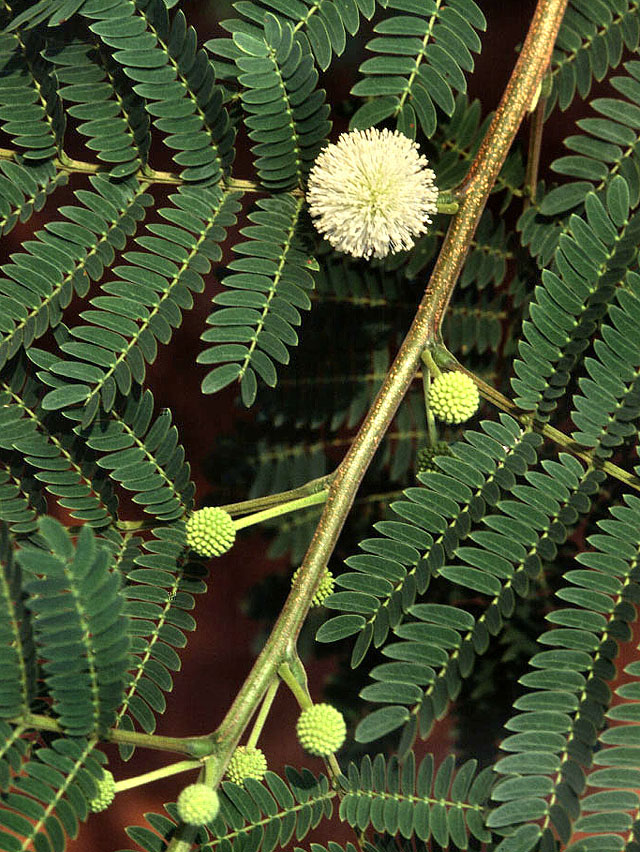

Scientific classification
- Kingdom: Plantae
- Clade: Tracheophytes
- Clade: Angiosperms
- Clade: Eudicots
- Clade: Rosids
- Order: Fabales
- Family: Fabaceae
- Subfamily: Caesalpinioideae
- Clade: Mimosoid clade
- Genus: Leucaena
- Species: L. leucocephala

Binomial name
- Leucaena leucocephala (Lam.) de Wit

Synonyms
- Acacia frondosa Willd.; Acacia glauca (L.) Willd.; Acacia leucocephala (Lam.) Link; Acacia leucophala Link; Leucaena glabra Benth.; Leucaena glauca Benth.; Mimosa glauca sensu L.1763 Misapplied; Mimosa glauca Koenig ex Roxb.; Mimosa leucocephala Lam.; Mimosa leucophala Lam.

= Leucaena leucocephala =

Species of legume

Leucaena leucocephala is a small fast-growing mimosoid tree native to southern Mexico and northern Central America (Belize and Guatemala). It is now naturalized throughout the tropics including parts of Asia.

Common names include white leadtree, white popinac, horse tamarind, ipil-ipil, koa haole, tan-tan, and tangantangan.

Leucaena leucocephala is used for a variety of purposes, such as fencing, soil fertility, firewood, fiber, and livestock fodder.

== Description ==
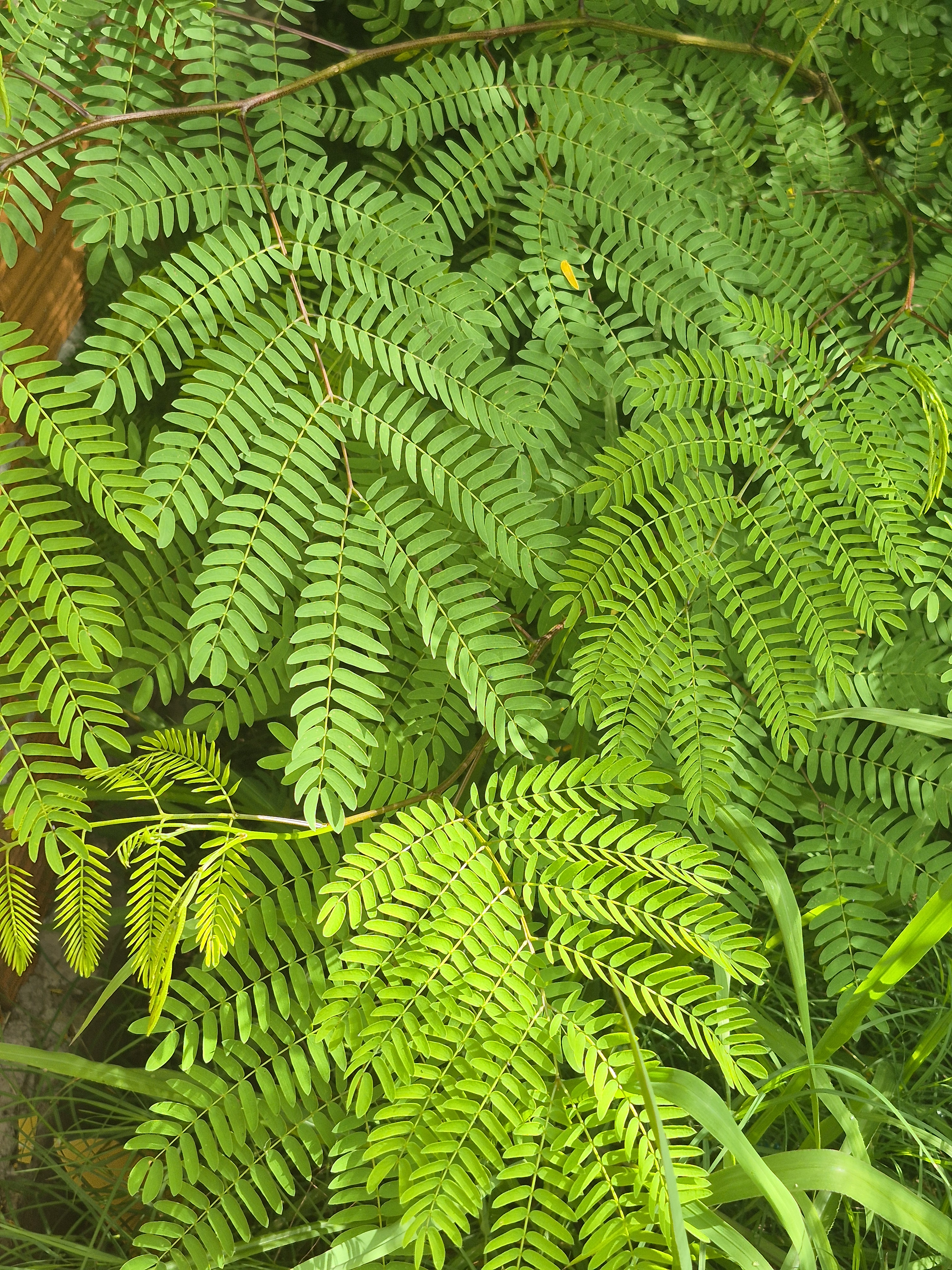
Leaves

Leucaena leucocephala is a small tree, growing up to 7–18 metres (23–59 ft). The branches have no thorns, each branch has 6–8 pairs of leaf stalks that bear 11–23 pairs of leaflets, each leaflet is 8–17 mm long with a pale green surface and whitish underneath.

Its inflorescence is a cream-coloured puff with many stamens. They produce flat and straight seed pods measuring 13–18 cm (5.1–7.1 in) long that matures from a green colour to a brown; one pod contains between 15 and 30 seeds.

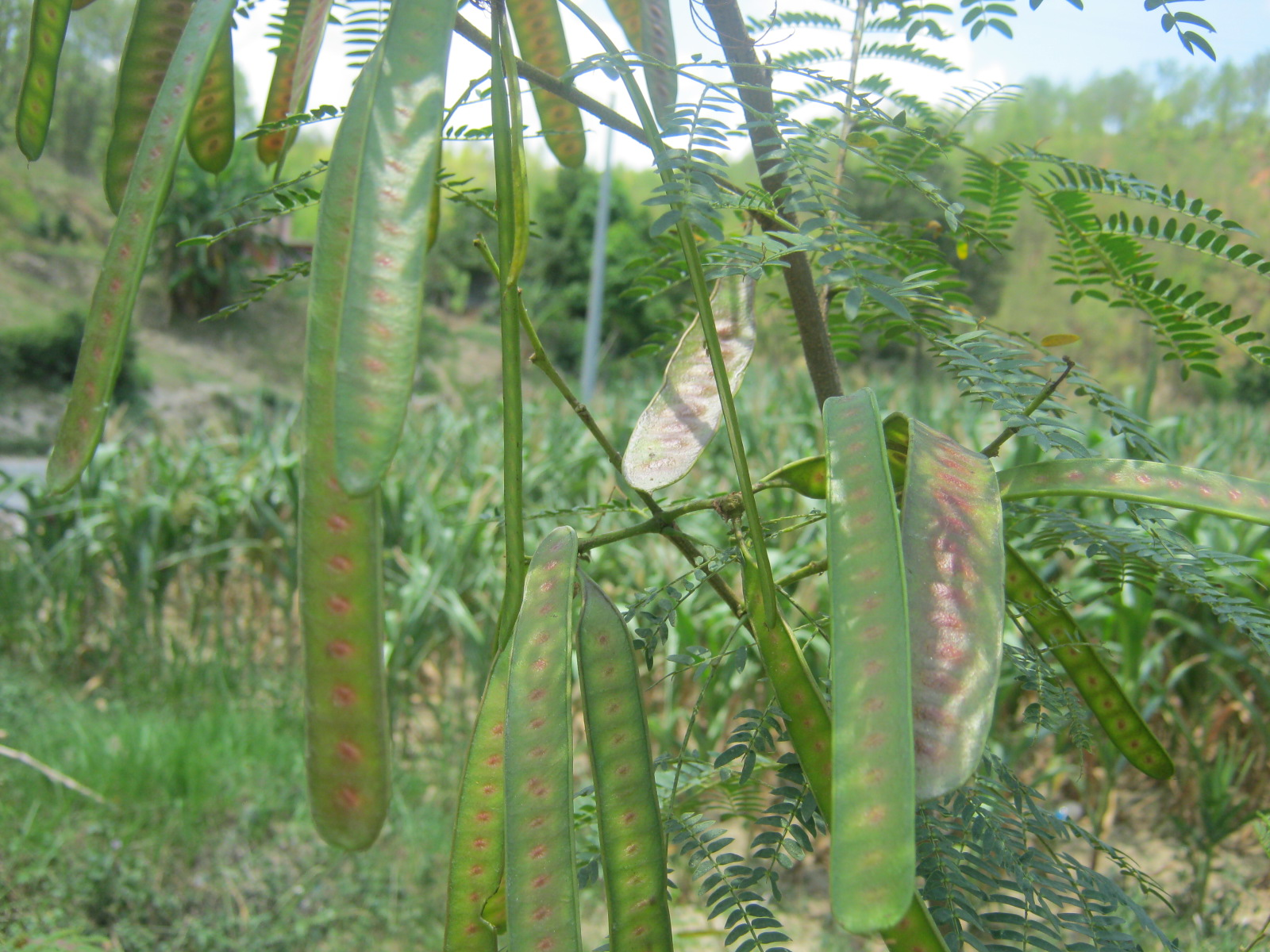
L. leucocephala pods in the month of May, Nepal

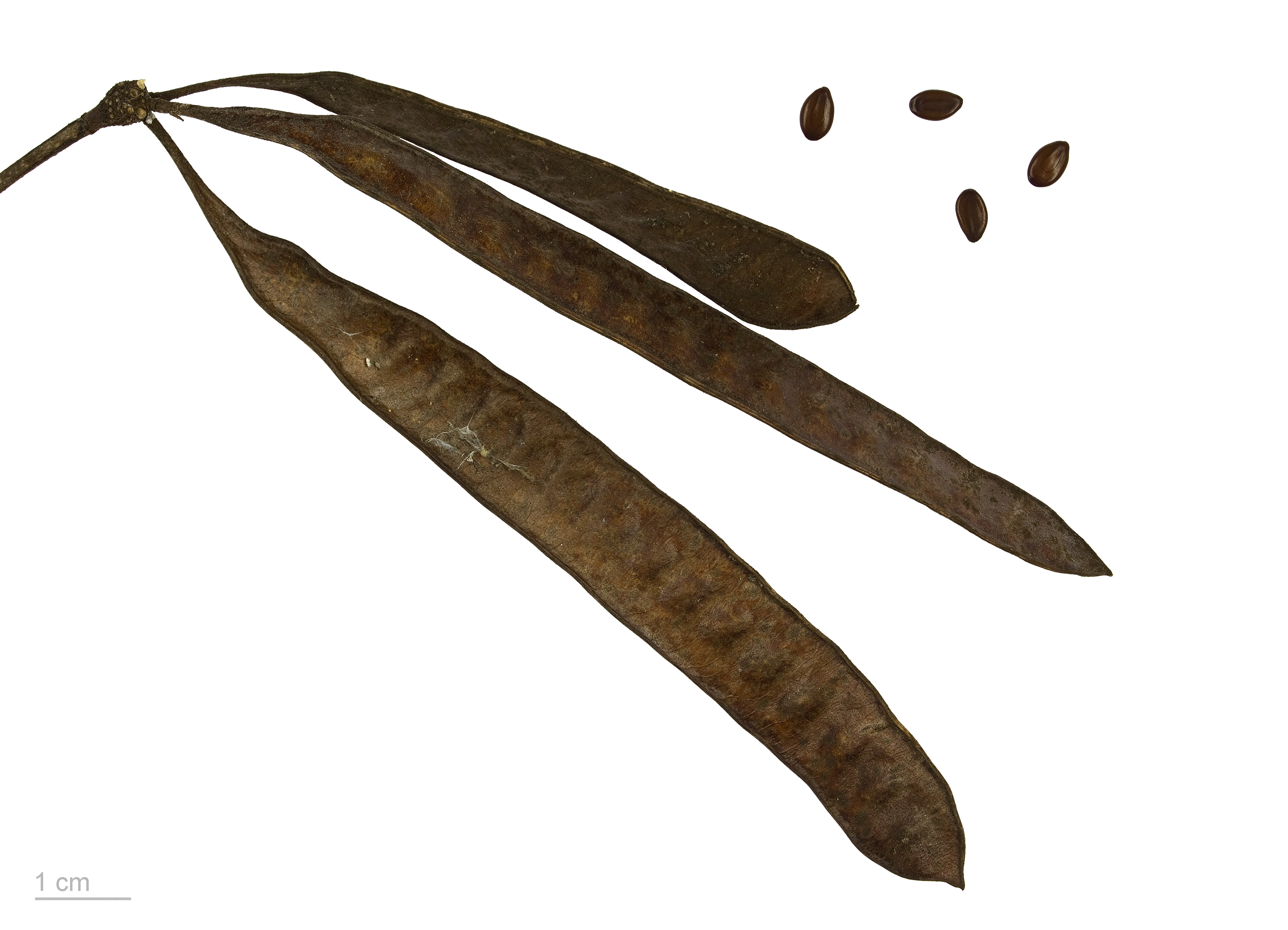
Dried L. leucocephala pod and seeds - MHNT

== Ecology ==
Leucaena leucocephala is susceptible to insect infestations. In the 1980s, a widespread loss in Southeast Asia was due to pest attack by psyllids.

In India, this tree was initially promoted for afforestation due to its fast-growing nature. However, it is now considered unsuitable for urban planting because of its tendency to get uprooted in rain and wind. Eight of every ten trees uprooted by wind in Pune are L. leucocephala.

== Invasive properties ==
Leucaena leucocephala is considered one of the 100 worst invasive species by the Invasive Species Specialist Group of the IUCN Species Survival Commission.

It is a highly invasive species in the arid parts of Taiwan, The Bahamas, the Hawaiian Islands, Fiji, Puerto Rico, Hong Kong, South Africa, and northern Australia, as well as in northern Malay Peninsula, South America and Southern Europe.

The plant is also found in parts of the U.S., including California, Arizona, Texas, Hawaii, and Florida.

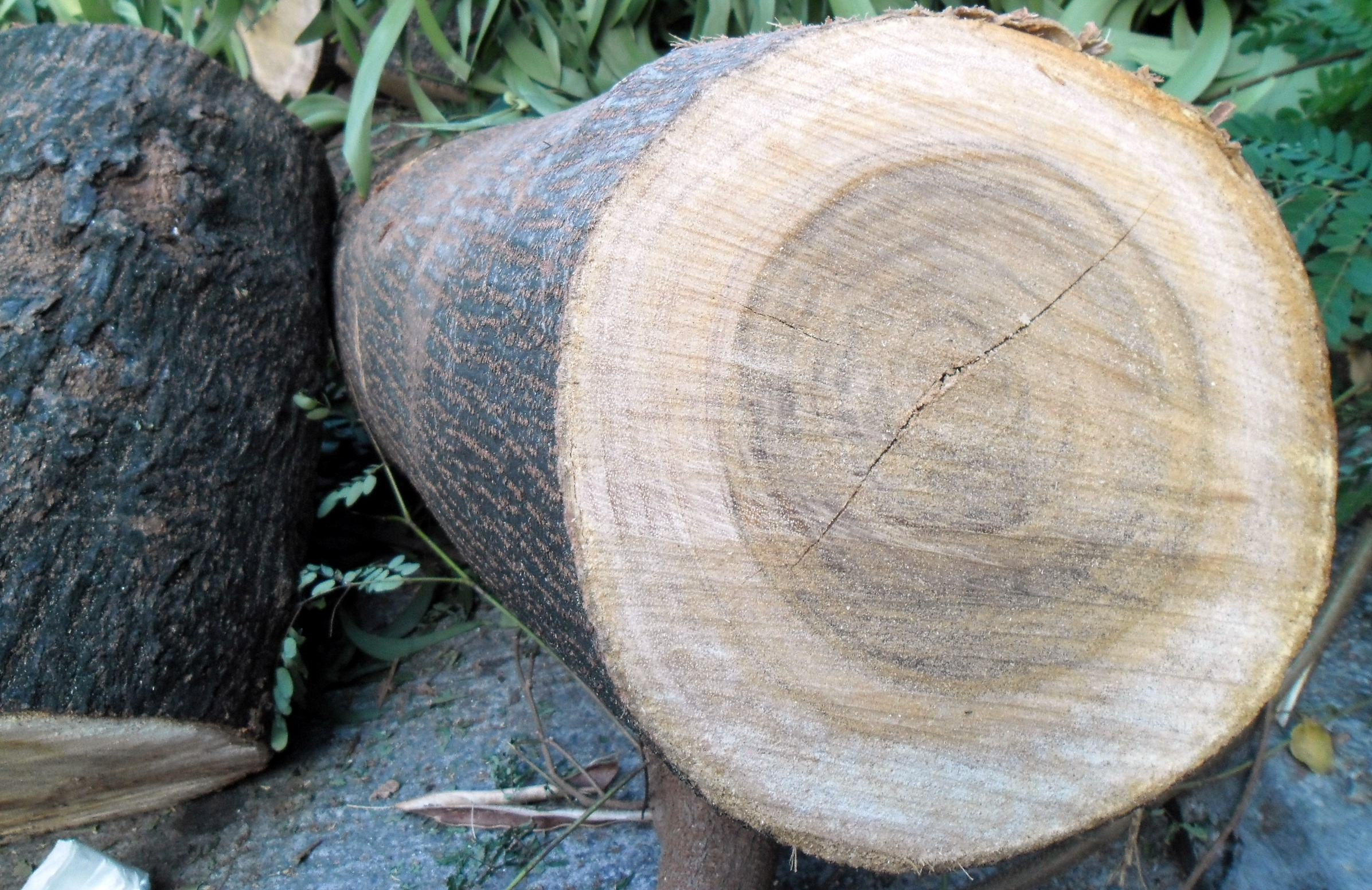
Leucaena leucocephala wood and bark

It grows quickly and forms dense thickets that crowd out native vegetation.

In urban areas, it is an especially unwanted species, growing along roadsides, creek drainages, and on abandoned land.

== Toxicity ==
The seeds and tissues of Leucaena leucocephala contain mimosine, an amino acid known to be toxic to nonruminant vertebrates, allopathic to some plant species.

== Uses ==
During the 1970s and 1980s, Leucaena leucocephala was promoted as a "miracle tree" for its multiple uses. It has also been described as a "conflict tree" because it is used for forage production but status as an environmental weed when unmanaged.

The legume is promoted in several countries of Southeast Asia (at least Burma, Cambodia, Indonesia, Laos, and Thailand), most importantly as a source of quality animal feed, but also for residual use for firewood or charcoal production.

=== Culinary ===
The young pods are edible and occasionally eaten in Javanese vegetable salad with spicy peanut sauce, and spicy fish wrapped in papaya or taro leaves in Indonesia, and in papaya salad in Laos and Thailand, where they are known as phak krathin (Thai: ผักกระถิน). In Mexico it is eaten in soups and also inside tacos, it is known as guaje. Cooking is thought to remove most of the poison.

=== Forage and fodder ===
The legume provides an excellent source of high-protein cattle fodder. However, the fodder contains mimosine, a toxic amino acid. Horses and donkeys which are fed it lose their hair.

In many cases this acid is metabolized by ruminants to goitrogenic DHP [3-hydroxy-4(1H) pyridone] in the rumen, but in some geographical areas, ruminants lack the organisms (such as Synergistes jonesii) that can degrade DHP.

In such cases, toxicity problems from ingestion of Leucaena have sometimes been overcome by infusing susceptible animals with rumen fluid from ruminants that possess such organisms, and more recently by inoculating cattle rumina with such organisms cultured in vitro.

Such measures have facilitated Leucaena use for fodder in Australia and elsewhere.

=== Green manure and biomass production ===
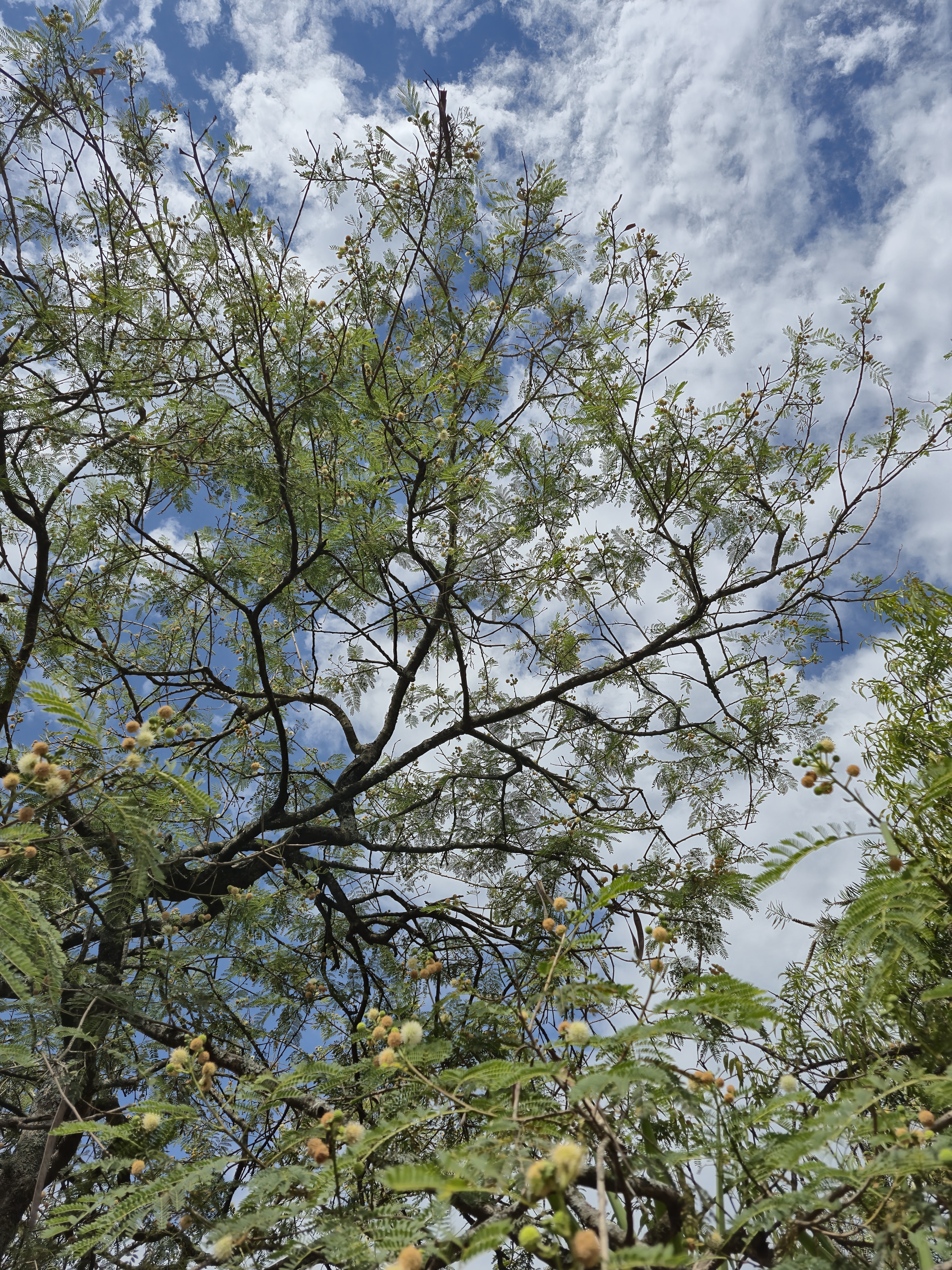
Tree

Leucaena leucocephala has been considered for biomass production because its reported yield of foliage corresponds to a dried mass of 2,000–20,000 kg/ha/year, and that of wood 30–40 m^{3}/ha/year, with up to twice those amounts in favorable climates. In India it is being promoted for both fodder and energy.

It is also efficient in nitrogen fixation, at more than 500 kg/ha/year.

It has a very fast growth rate: young trees reach a height of more than 20 ft (6.1 m) in two to three years.

=== Pulpwood for paper industry ===
The wood of Leucaena leucocephala is used for making pulp in the pulp and paper industry. In the southern and central states of India, it is the most important pulpwood species for making pulp. It has huge positive socio-economic impact on the livelihood of the small farmers where Leucaena leucocephala is grown as an industrial crop. This provides an alternative crop to the farmers of Andhra Pradesh and Telangana, where they are also growing cotton and chillies.

=== Potential as bioherbicidal agent ===
Leucaena leucocephala is an allelopathic tree. Phytotoxic allelochemicals, such as mimosine and certain phenolic compounds, including p-hydroxycinnamic acid, protocatechuic acid, and gallic acid, have been identified in the leaves of the species. Bioherbicidal activity of L. leucocephala on terrestrial plants and aquatic weed water hyacinth were reported.

== In culture ==
The state of Oaxaca in Mexico derives its name from the Nahuatl word huaxyacac, the name for Leucaena leucocephala trees that are found around Oaxaca City.

== Gallery ==
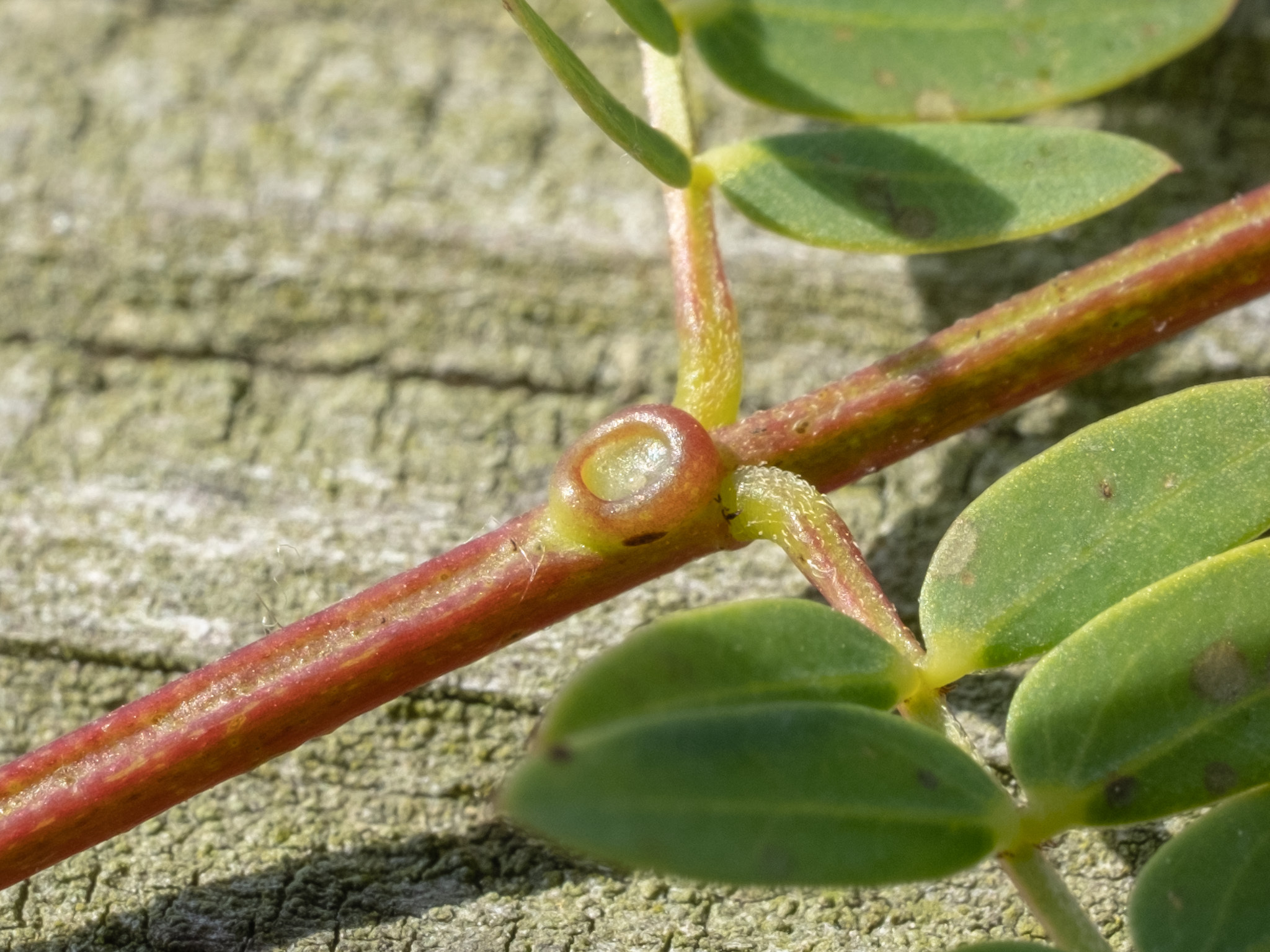
Extrafloral nectary

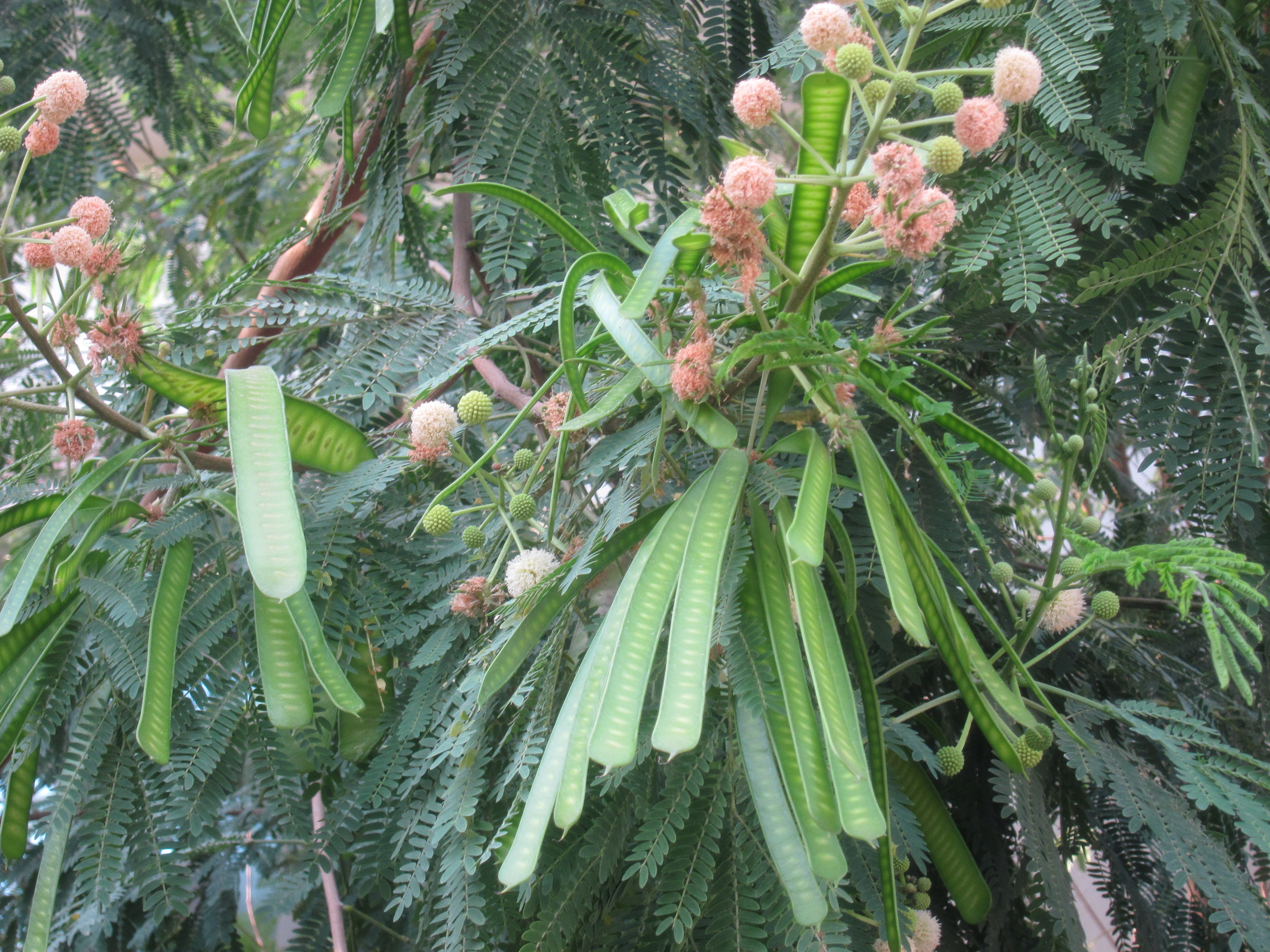
Flowers and immature fruit

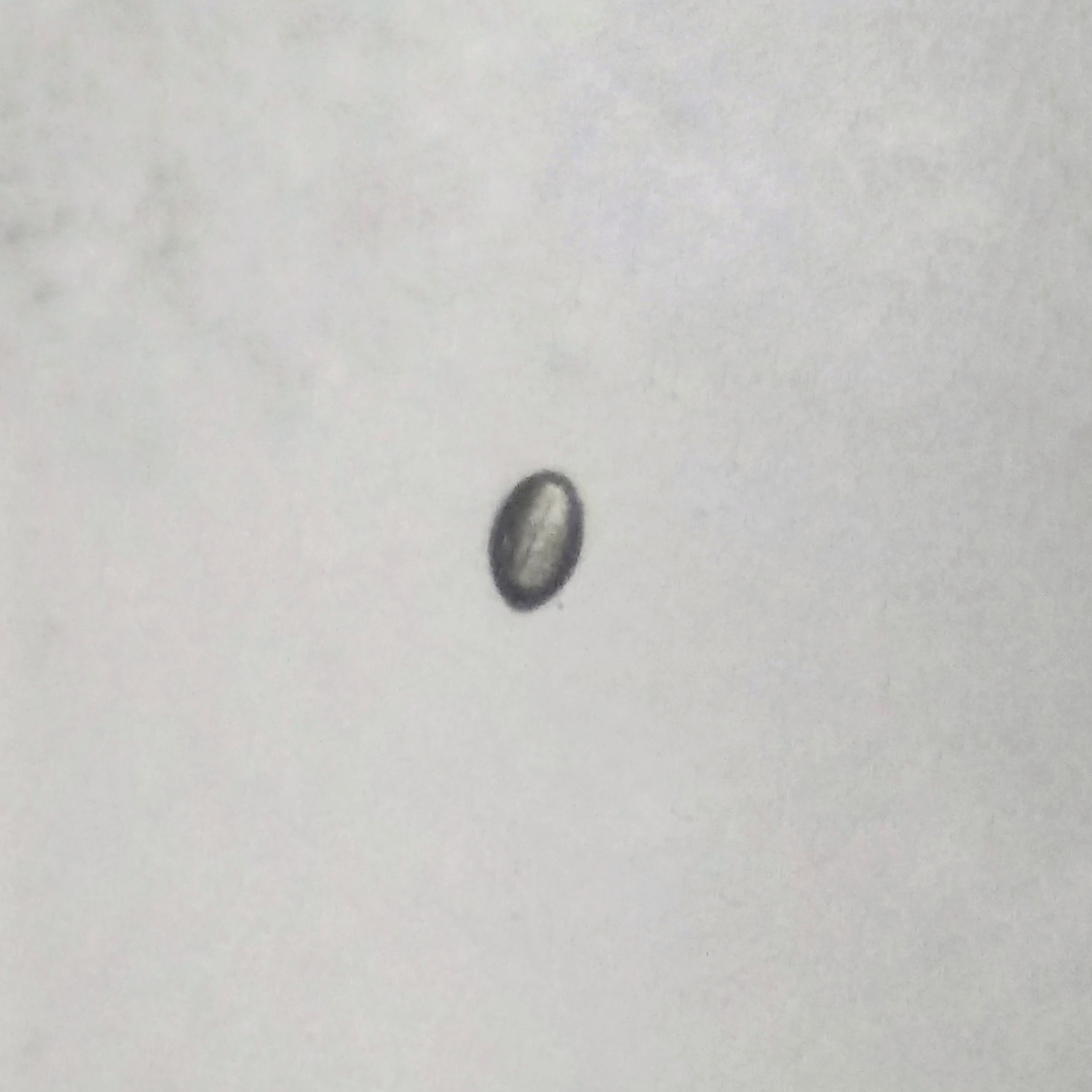
Pollen

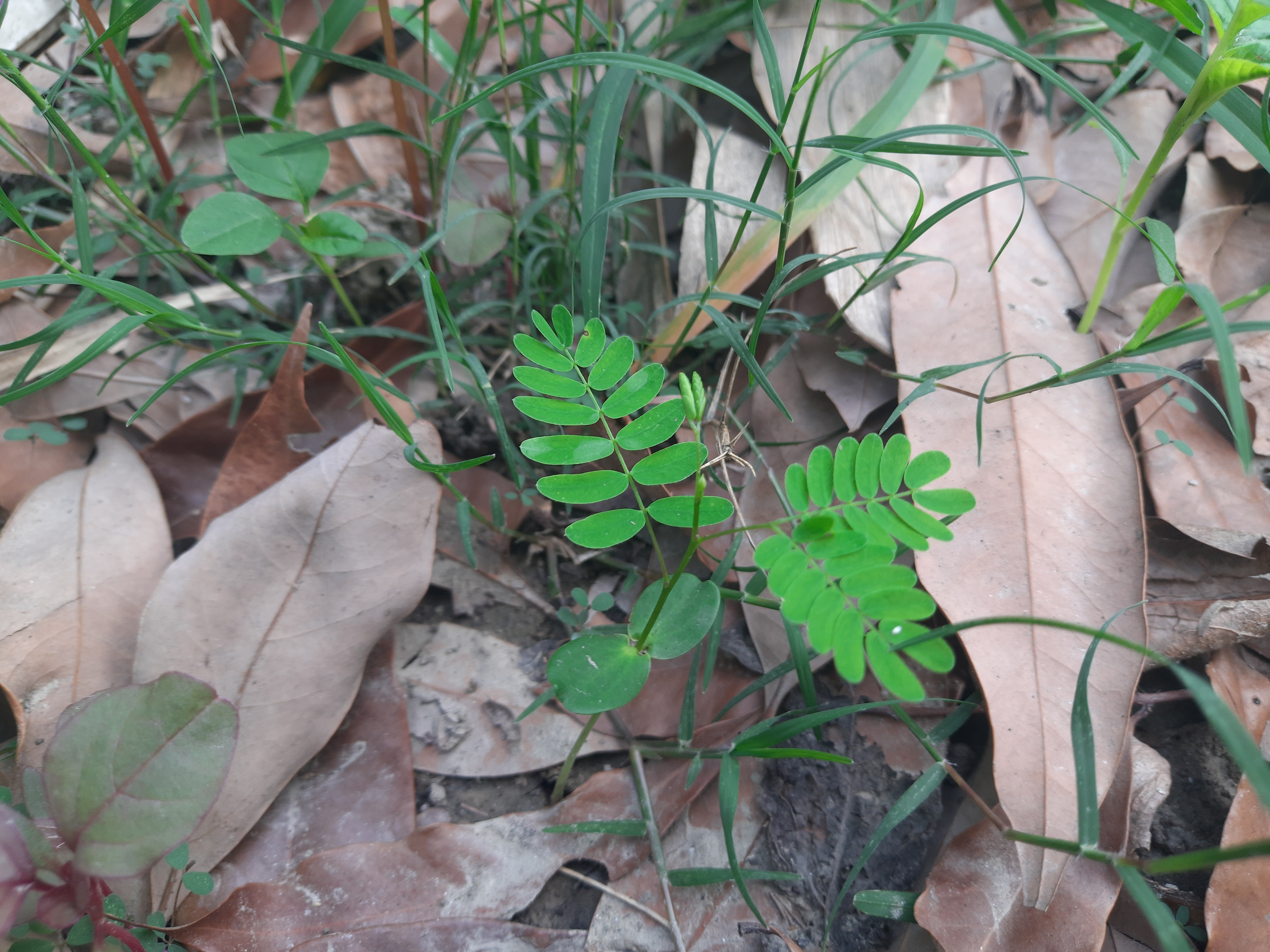
Sapling of Leucaena leucocephala. The cotyledons are visible.

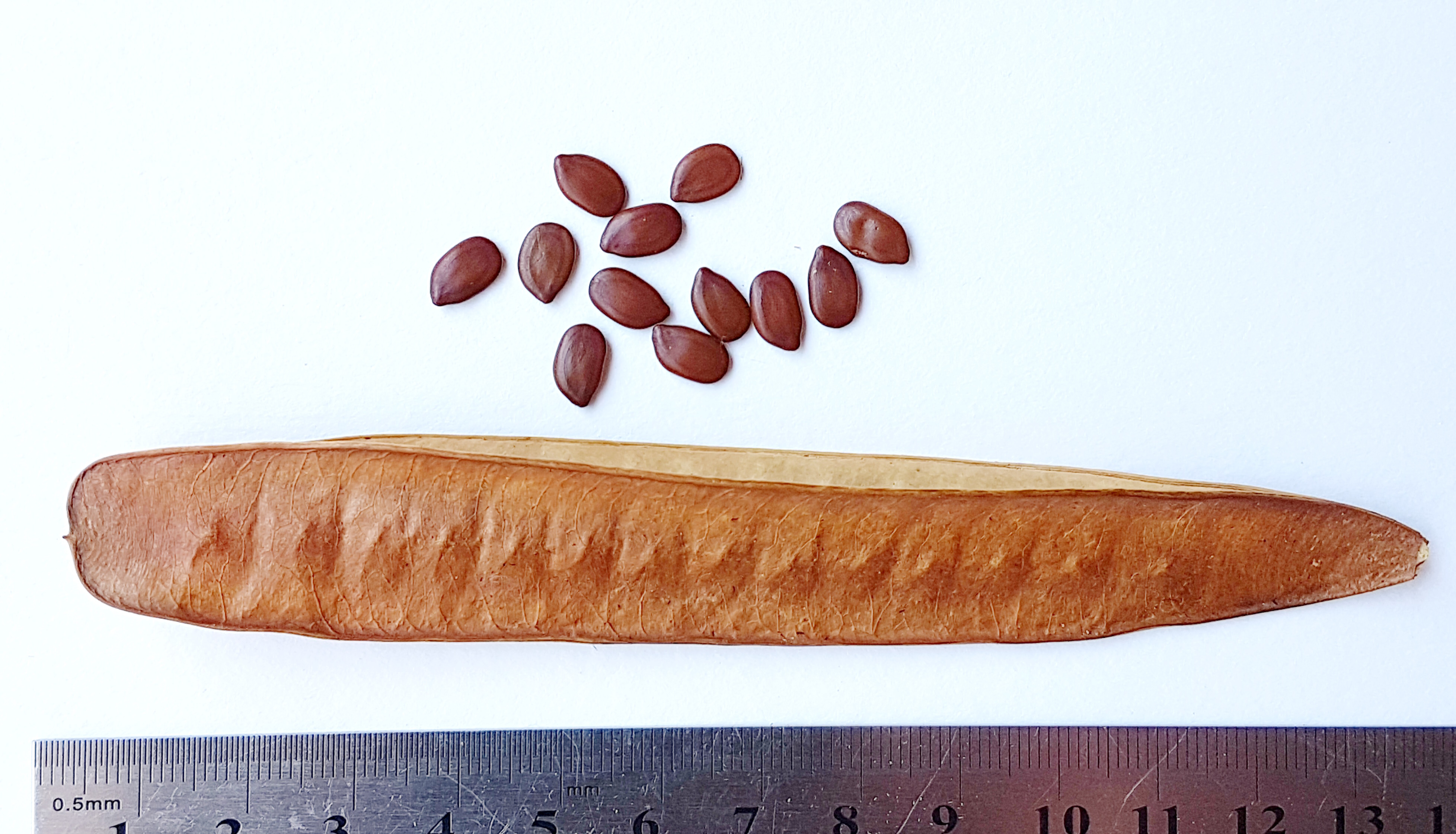
Pod and seeds

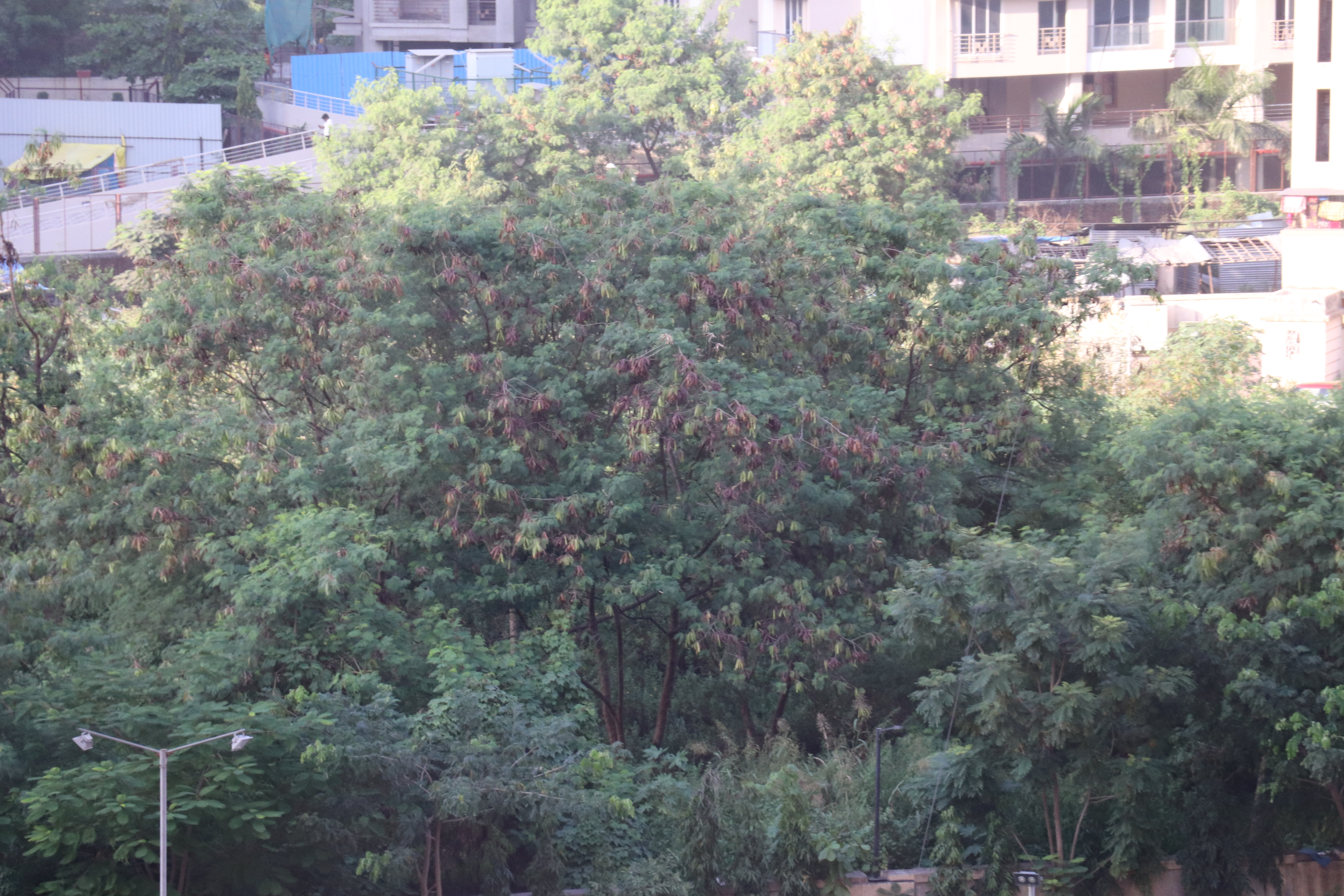
Subabul growing wild on the outskirts of Mumbai
