= Thermocrinis ruber =

Scientific classification
- Domain: Bacteria
- Kingdom: Pseudomonadati
- Phylum: Aquificota
- Class: Aquificia
- Order: Aquificales
- Family: Aquificaceae
- Genus: Thermocrinis
- Species: T. ruber

Binomial name
- Thermocrinis ruber Huber et al. 1999

Type strain
- DSM 23557; OC 1/4

Species of bacterium

Thermocrinis ruber is a species of Gram-negative bacteria first discovered in Octopus Spring in Yellowstone National Park. It is a pink-filament-forming, hyperthermophilic bacterium growing in temperatures between 44 °C and 89 °C, with the optimal temperature being 80 °C. Its type strain is OC 1/4 [= DSM 12173] and OC14/7/2 [DSM No. 23557, AJ005640].

== Etymology ==
Thermocrinis ruber was named by Huber et al. The genus name, Thermocrinis, comes from the Greek word "therme" which means heat, and the Latin word "crinis", which means hair. The species name, ruber, comes from the Latin word for red. The species' full name illustrates how it forms red, filamentous strands that looks like hair in high temperature environments.

== Morphology ==
Thermocrinis ruber are Gram-negative, rod-shaped bacteria. T. ruber cells contain multiple flagella on one end of the cell. Cells are usually 1 to 3 μm long and 0.4 to 0.5 μm wide. T. ruber does not form spores, but can grow individually, as pairs, or in groups as pink filaments.

== Taxonomy ==
Thermocrinis ruber is a member of the Aquificales order and Aquificaceae family. The Aquificaceae family also include the Aquifex and Hydrogenobacter genera, which are the closest related genera to T. ruber. While T. ruber shares many characteristics with these two genera: being Gram-negative, rod-shaped, and autotrophs, there are still many differences that set it apart, which are described below. The Thermocrinis genus was created for this organism within the Aquificales order by Huber et al.

Organisms of the Thermocrinis genus are defined as Gram-negative rods that are non-sporulating (i.e., do not form spores), and can form filaments in different mediums. Thermocrinis organisms can grow in temperatures up to 89 °C and mainly populate hot springs. There are four organisms in the Thermocrinis genus: T. ruber, T. albus, T. minervae, and T. jamiesonii, all of which are chemolithoautotrophs and hyperthermophiles found in hot springs

=== Nearest neighbors ===
16s ribosomal RNA sequencing was used to create a phylogenetic tree that showed T. ruber's close relations to organisms of the Aquifex and Hydrogenobacter genera, as well as to other organisms within the Thermocrinis genera. Evolutionary distance, a measure of how different two genomic sequences are, as well as Average Nucleotide Identity, a measure of how many nucleotides two organisms share, was used to determine close neighbors.

==== Thermocrinis albus ====
Thermocrinis albus is an obligate autotroph (i.e., only uses carbon dioxide as a carbon source) found in an Icelandic hot spring and it has a distance of 5.1% phylogenetic distance to T. ruber. This implies that although it is within the same genus as T. ruber, it may be long to a different lineage.

==== Thermocrinis minervae ====
Thermocrinis minervae was isolated from a Costa Rican hot spring and it has a 95.7 % 16s RNA sequence similarity to T. ruber.

==== Thermocrinis jamisonii ====
Thermocrinis jamiesonii was isolated from Great Boiling Spring in Nevada and it has a 97.10 % 16s RNA sequence similarity to T. ruber.

==== Hydrogenobacter hydrogenophilus ====
Hydrogenobacter hydrogenophilus is a Gram-negative thermophile isolated from a thermal spring in Kamchatka. It has an 84.62% Average Nucleotide Identity similarity to T. ruber.

==== Aquifex pyrophilus ====
Aquifex pyrophilus is a Gram-negative, hyperthermophilic rod isolated from marine sediments in Kolbeinsey Ridge, Iceland. A. pyrophilus are chemolithoautotrophs and the Aquifex genus was created for this organism. The evolutionary distance between T. ruber and Aquifex pyrophilus is 12.8%

==== Hydrogenbacter thermophilus ====
Hydrogenobacter thermophilus is an obligate chemolithotrophic, Gram-negative thermophile isolated from hot springs within Japan. The evolutionary distance between T. ruber and Hydrogenbacter thermophilus TK-6 is 6.5%.

== Discovery ==
Thermocrinis ruber was discovered in Octopus Spring in Yellowstone National Park, Wyoming. Microbiologist Thomas Brock found that the pink filaments in the hot springs were living organisms in the 1960s when he found they contained proteins and nucleic acids. Thomas Brock initially investigated the microorganisms in Yellowstone Park after a report by ES Kempner found that blue-green algae from the park could grow in temperatures up to 73 °C. Brock took multiple samples at varying times from Mushroom Spring and found that the microorganisms could photosynthesize most efficiently at the temperature they were collected from. Any variance in temperature decreases their efficiency, implying that they have developed mutations that allow them to adapt to the temperatures they grow in. With this discovery, he discovered hyperthermophiles, microorganisms that thrive at higher temperatures. Later, he discovered the pink filaments near White Creek that were in temperatures of 88 °C. He used spectrophotometry to analyze the filaments by wavelength and discovered they were chemotrophic (i.e., used chemicals for energy), as they contained no chlorophyll and could not photosynthesize. While he discovered the existence of T. ruber in these pink filaments, he did not continue research and analysis on them.

== Isolation and analysis ==
Thermocrinis ruber's isolation analysis was conducted by Huber et al. They used light microscopy, electron microscopy, and 16s RNA analysis to confirm that the organism was a new species. They collected pink filaments in October 1994 from Octopus Spring, which has temperatures of 82-88 °C and a pH of 8.0. Samples were enriched with LS medium, a differential media that distinguishes species based on their biochemical processes, for isolation.

Thermocrinis ruber cells were transferred to synthetic Octopus Spring medium for experimentation and were then directly counted in a Thoma cell counting chamber. Growth studies were conducted using a glass chamber that allowed for medium flow at 92 °C to mimic the natural conditions of Octopus Springs. Transmission electron microscopy was conducted with a Philips model CM 12 electron microscope at 120 kV and showed that T. ruber cells contained multiple flagella on one end of the cell. Scanning electron microscopy was conducted with a Hitachi model S-4100 field emission scanning electron microscope and illustrated T. ruber's cellular morphology. The 16s RNA gene, a gene used to construct microbial phylogenetic trees, was sequenced and analyzed. A 16s RNA phylogenetic tree was constructed using the Technical University Department of Microbiology's ARB program's Neighbor-Joining algorithm and Jukes-Cantor corrections. The ARB program is a software that contains tools for ribosomal RNA, nucleic acid, and amino acid sequence database and analysis. The Neighbor-Joining algorithm creates phylogenetic trees while Jukes-Cantor Corrections calculate nucleotide differences while accounting for mutations. The constructed phylogenetic tree placed T. ruber as a member of the Aquificales order and showed that T. ruber was closely related to Aquifex pyrophilus and Hydrogenbacter thermophilus TK-6 based on evolutionary distance.

=== Classification ===
The 16s rRNA gene sequence of the original bacteria found in Yellowstone was labeled EM17. Scientists replicated EM17 in the lab and called it OC 1/4, which was 98.7% in similarity. This cultivated strain was stored in a German collection of microorganisms called Deutsche Sammlung von Mikroorganismen und Zellkulturen (DSMZ) under DSM 12173 and its 16s rRNA gene was stored in the European Molecular Biology Laboratory (EMBL) nucleotide sequence database under accession number AJ005640. However, when DSM 12173 underwent a quality control inspection, scientists found that DSM 12173 did not match AJ005640. Instead, DSM 12173 was more closely related to T. albus, and it had been mislabeled. To rectify this, researchers retested preserved samples of the original T. ruber strain OC 1/4 which resulted in its resubmission in the DSMZ as DSM 23557.

== Genomics ==
Whole genome sequencing of the T. ruber strain DSM 23557 has been performed by principal investigator Jonathan Eisen at the DOE Joint Genome Institute (JGI). This project was part of the Genomic Encyclopedia of Bacteria and Archaea (GEBA) study. The exact sequencing technology used is unknown. DSM 23557 is the only strain sequenced, so it serves as the reference genome. The bacteria has a genome size of 1.5 Mb and GC content of 45%. GC content is the percentage of cytosine and guanine bases in a genome and can provide information about DNA stability and evolution. It has a total of 1675 genes comprising: 1613 protein coding, 1 non-coding, 44 tRNA, 3 rRNA, 12 pseudogenes, and 2 others.

The DNA base composition of T. ruber was also analyzed using two methods described in Huber et al. on strain OC 1/4. The first method involved melting point analysis, which relies on thermal denaturation of DNA and correlates GC content with the temperature at which the DNA strands separate. This method resulted in 47.2% GC content. The second method used high performance liquid chromatography which directly analyzes the nucleosides in the DNA. This method found the GC content to be 47.8%.

== Metabolism ==
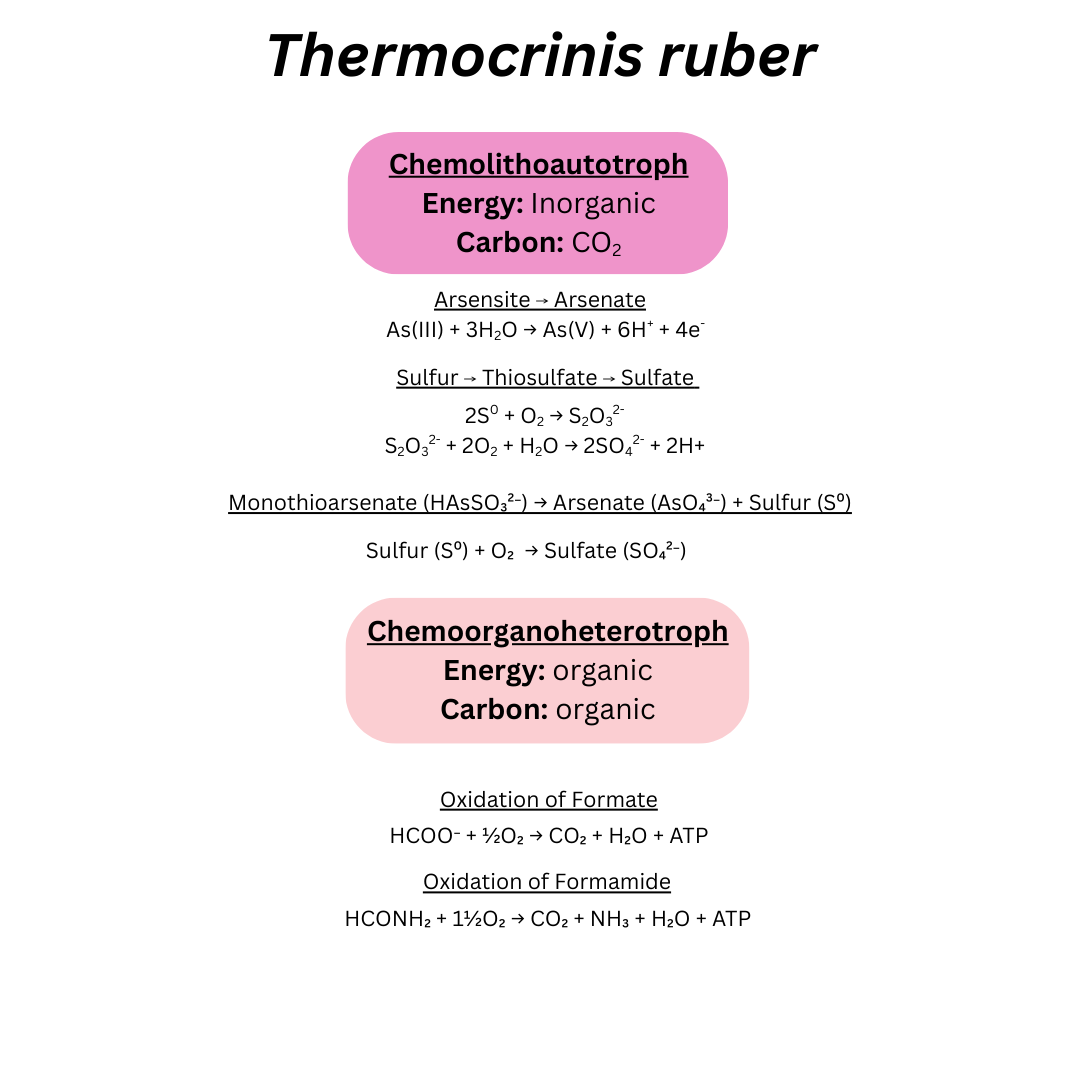
Figure 1. Different metabolic pathways of T. ruber

Thermocrinis ruber only needs a small amount of oxygen to grow, which makes it a microaerophile. It can rely on several different metabolic pathways because it is both a chemolithoautotroph and chemoorganoheterotroph. As a chemolithoautotroph, it likes to use inorganic compounds like hydrogen, thiosulfate, and sulfur as its energy source because they can be electron donors. For example, it can oxidize arsenite to arsenate which releases electrons that can enter the electron transport chain to produce ATP that T. ruber can then use to fuel its growth. Similarly, the oxidation of sulfur to thiosulfate to sulfate is also said to result in exponential cell growth. Another way it can get its energy is by metabolizing monothioarsenate, which is a mixed species of arsenic and sulfur. Monothioarsenate undergoes an initial chemical reaction which yields arsenate and elemental sulfur. Instead of immediately using these end products as an energy source, T. ruber converts the sulfur into sulfate. By using up the sulfur that was just newly made, the reaction is pushed forward and causes even more sulfur to be made in order to replace the ones that were used up. This creates a cycle where the supply of sulfur for T. ruber to use in the future increases. Therefore whether it be arsenic, sulfur, or a mix of the two, hot springs are an optimal environment for T. ruber to grow as they provide a rich source of energy that fuels its metabolic pathways.

Besides that, T. ruber can also act as a chemoorganoheterotroph, which means that it can use organic compounds like formate or formamide as both energy and carbon sources. However, its growth is limited to these organic compounds and is not very receptive to others like fumarate, methanol, and citrate. Because it can switch between using inorganic and organic materials, T. ruber is very adaptable to whatever resources are in its environment and explains why it can live in harsh environments like hot springs.

== Physiology ==
Given that T. ruber is a thermophile, it can grow in high temperatures up to 89 °C. However, the optimal temperature sits at 80 °C. It thrives in environments that are neutral and slightly basic (pH 7 to 8.5) and has a low tolerance for salinity. In the lab, the T. ruber strain tested positive for catalase and meso-diaminopimelic acid. Therefore, T. ruber can break down hydrogen peroxide that is deadly for bacterial cells. This was tested with a 3% H_{2}O_{2} solution and thin layer chromatography, respectively.

== Importance and future endeavors ==
Thermocrinis ruber is the first discovered organism in the Thermocrinis genus, and the organism the genus was created for. The discovery of the organism was part of the discovery of hyperthermophiles, and can be used in further research to see how these microorganisms survive in extreme conditions. Scientists found it has a protein called Protein-Only RNase P (PRORP) which cuts and prepares tRNA that can withstand hot temperatures. As a result, this can be used to better understand tRNA processing, which is an essential life process for protein synthesis, as well as give evolutionary insight into how PRORP was used in ancient microbial life.

Since T. ruber is a hyperthermophile, it is able to produce heat-stable enzymes like proteases, amylases, and DNA polymerases. Due to these unique properties, many patents surrounding this topic have been filed. This highlights the implications hyperthermophiles like T. ruber are having in the biotechnology and pharmaceutical industries, as well as their potential in opening up new avenues for efficient and cost-effective laboratory techniques.

T. ruber could play an important role in biogeochemical cycles for carbon, arsenic, and sulfur because of its redox capabilities. These elements play a vital role in sustaining life and in maintaining the ecosystem.
