= Thermocrinis jamiesonii =

Scientific classification
- Domain: Bacteria
- Kingdom: Pseudomonadati
- Phylum: Aquificota
- Class: Aquificia
- Order: Aquificales
- Family: Aquificaceae
- Genus: Thermocrinis
- Species: T. jamiesonii

Binomial name
- Thermocrinis jamiesonii Dodsworth et al. 2015

Species of bacterium

Thermocrinis jamiesonii is a Gram-negative bacterium that is thermophilic, growing at temperatures ranging from 70 to 85°C. It grows as a chemolithoautotroph or chemolithoheterotroph, using thiosulfate as its sole electron donor, and is obligately microaerophilic. The strain GBS1^{T} was isolated from Great Boiling Spring, Nevada, USA.

== Physiology ==
Thermocrinis jamiesonii is a chemoautotrophic and chemolithoheterotrophic bacterium from the family Aquificaceae. It requires thiosulfate as an electron donor. It cannot use sulfur or hydrogen like others within this genus. This species can tolerate a higher NaCl concentration (1.17%) than other species within the genus, which includes Thermocrinis albus (0.7%), Thermocrinis minervae (0.5%), and Thermocrinis ruber (0.5%). T. jamiesonii is an obligate microaerophile, with a growth range of 0.5-8% oxygen, growing optimally at 1-2%, and cannot grow anaerobically. A neutral pH is preferred, ranging between 6.50 and 7.75, with optimal growth at 7.25. Thermocrinis jamiesonii can use peptone, Casamino acids, and acetate as carbon sources for chemolithoheterotrophic growth. It cannot use yeast extract, glucose, formate, or formamide.

== Morphology ==
Thermocrinis jamiesonii is a rod-shaped bacterium that was observed as individual or pairs. The length of cells ranges from 1.4 to 2.4 μm, with width ranging from 0.4 to 0.6 μm. Flagella have not been observed through electron microscopy, and motility has not been observed. However, genes encoding flagella were found in the genome, suggesting that motility may be expressed in situ. Spores did not form.

== Phylogeny ==
A phylogenetic analysis of the 16S rRNA gene sequence showed that Thermocrinis jamiesonii is most closely related to Thermocrinis ruber, within the family Aquificaceae. Other genera in the family include Aquifex and Hydrogenobacter.

== Genomic analysis ==
The draft genome of Thermocrinis jamiesonii is 1,315,625 bp long in 10 contigs. It encodes for 1,463 genes, 1,415 of which are protein-coding, 43 tRNA genes, and one rRNA operon. 36 carbohydrate-active enzymes (CAZymes) were found, including glycoside hydrolases (GHs), which suggests that T. jamiesonii may be able to grow on polymers, such as starch, like Thermocrinis minervae. A sox gene cluster (soxABXYZ) was present, which is required for thiosulfate oxidation. It lacks NiFe hydrogenase (hyaB) and formate dehydrogenase genes (fdhA), indicating that it cannot grow with H_{2} or formate, distinguishing it from other Thermocrinis species. It lacks the 2-oxoglutarate-ferredoxin oxidoreductase gene, which is required for the rTCA cycle to fix CO_{2} but does encode for other enzymes present in this cycle. All genes essential to flagellar assembly were present. Genes encoding signature lipids C_{20-22} found in the family Aquificaceae were present.

== Ecology ==
Thermocrinis jamiesonii was isolated from the water column on the north side of Great Boiling Spring near Gerlach, Nevada, USA. The abundance of Thermocrinis species in the spring water was estimated by 16S rRNA gene surveys as 91.5%.

== Etymology ==
Thermocrinis jamiesonii was named after David and Sandy Jamieson who provided logistical support during the sampling process and allowed research access to many scientists to Great Boiling Spring in Nevada, USA.
