= Persephonella marina =

Scientific classification
- Domain: Bacteria
- Kingdom: Pseudomonadati
- Phylum: Aquificota
- Class: Aquificia
- Order: Aquificales
- Family: Hydrogenothermaceae
- Genus: Persephonella
- Species: P. marina

Binomial name
- Persephonella marina Götz et al. 2002

Species of bacterium

Persephonella marina is a Gram-negative, rod shaped bacteria that is a member of the Aquificota phylum. Stemming from Greek, the name Persephonella is based upon the mythological goddess Persephone. Marina stems from a Latin origin, meaning "belonging to the sea". It is a thermophile with an obligate chemolithoautotrophic metabolism. Growth of P. marina can occur in pairs or individually, but is rarely seen aggregating in large groups. The organism resides on sulfidic chimneys in the deep ocean and has never been documented as a pathogen.

== Discovery ==
Persephonella marina was first isolated in 1999 using MSH medium, a medium containing 29 g NaCl, 2 g NaOH, 0.5 g KCl, 1.36 g MgCl_{2}•6H_{2}O, 7 g MgSO_{4}•7H2O, 2 g Na_{2}S_{2}O_{3}•5H_{2}O, 0.4 g CaCl_{2}•2H_{2}O, 0.2 g NH_{4}Cl, 0.3 g K_{2}HPO_{4}•3H_{2}O and 10 ml of a trace-element stock solution, with a gas phase containing twenty parts carbon dioxide, one part oxygen, and twenty six parts hydrogen gas. Initial isolation was provided by a sample obtained from a depth of 2,507 meters on a sulfidic chimney. This particular sulfidic chimney was named "Q-Vent" and is located at a latitude of 9° North and a longitude of 104° West in a region called the East Pacific Rise. The environment in which P. marina was obtained was too harsh for humans due to the excessive temperature (133 °C with spikes up to 170 °C) and extreme pressure. Due to these harsh conditions a submarine was used for extraction of the samples.

== Genomics ==
Persephonella marina has a genome size of 1.9 mega (10^9) base pairs with 2,048 encoded genes. The organism contains a GC content of 37%. This is unusually low for thermophilic organisms which typically contain high amounts of GC bonds to prevent DNA denaturation. The organism's closest phylogenetic neighbor was isolated under the same study and was named Persephonella guaymasensis. It shares 96% of its genome with P. marina. Other similar genomes include: Hydrogenothermus marinus (94.5% similarity), and Aquifex pyrophilius (85% similarity).

== Characterization ==
=== Metabolism ===
Persephonella marina is an obligate chemolithoautotroph. It utilizes three primary electron donors: elemental sulfur (S°), hydrogen gas (H_{2}), and thiosulfate (S_{2}O_{3}^{2−}). Oxygen and nitrate act as electron acceptors for P. marina. In the lab, when P. marina was exposed to high amounts of elemental sulfur, the organism produced an excess of sulfide. When exposed to microaerophilic conditions as found near deep sea hydrothermal vents, P. marina was able to perform aerobic respiration. Oxygen is not the primary electron acceptor and can only be utilized when exposed to oxygen in this microaerophilic environment.

=== Growth conditions ===
Persephonella marina is a thermophilic organism that grows optimally in a temperature range of 55 to 80 degrees Celsius. The organism does show the ability to survive at hyperthermophilic conditions as it was first isolated in water temperatures of 133 degrees Celsius. P. marina does not have the ability to form spores, highlighting the presence of a process that keeps DNA and essential proteins stable at extremely high temperatures commonly found near hydrothermal vents. Once cultured the organism was found to be able to grow in halophilic conditions between 2 and 4 1/2 percent NaCl but grows optimally at 2 1/2 percent NaCl. P. marina possesses a wide range of pH in which it can grow, spanning from 4.7 to 7.5. In optimal growth conditions, the doubling time for P. marina is around 5 hours.

== Glucosylglycerate and α(1,6)glucosyl-α-(1,2)glucosylglycerate ==
Persephonella marina was used as a model organism for the characterization of genes and enzymes for the synthesis of glucosylglycerate found for the first time in a thermophile. Glucosylglycerate protects the microbe from thermal stresses and helps in adaptation to starvation conditions. This is of great importance to scientists who wish to study extremophiles. This solute is also important in the advancement of biotechnology. When tested in lab, glucosylglycerate increased the melting temperature of essential enzymes in basic metabolic pathways. It has an effect on a microbe's ability to withstand high-pressure environments. This rare solute has only been found in a few other halophilic bacteria and one Archaeon, but has never been encountered in a hyperthermophile such as P. marina. It is also worth noting that P. marina has led to the discovery of α(1,6)glucosyl-α-(1,2)glucosylglycerate by proton NMR and is still currently under study. Both of these solutes are disaccharide heterosides which are extremely rare in thermophiles.
