= Thermothrix =

Scientific classification
- Domain: Bacteria
- Kingdom: Pseudomonadati
- Phylum: Aquificota
- Class: Aquificia
- Order: Aquificales
- Family: Aquificaceae
- Genus: Thermothrix; Caldwell et al. 1981

Type species
- Thermothrix thiopara Caldwell et al. 1976 ex Caldwell et al. 1981

Species
- T. azorensis; T. thiopara

Genus of bacteria

Thermothrix is a genus of Gram-negative, non-spore-forming, thermophilic, motile bacteria with a single polar flagellum of the family Burkholderiaceae and class Betaproteobacteria.

== See also ==
- List of bacteria genera
- List of bacterial orders
