= Balnearium lithotrophicum =

Scientific classification
- Domain: Bacteria
- Kingdom: Pseudomonadati
- Phylum: Aquificota
- Class: Desulfurobacteriia
- Order: Desulfurobacteriales
- Family: Desulfurobacteriaceae
- Genus: Balnearium
- Species: B. lithotrophicum

Binomial name
- Balnearium lithotrophicum Takai et al. 2003

Species of bacterium

Balnearium lithotrophicum is a species of bacterium described in 2003 and classified as belonging to the Aquificota.

== Location ==
Balnearium lithotrophicum was recently found in the Suiyo Seamount and isolated as its own species. Suiyo Seamount is found off the east coast of Japan in an underwater volcano. This underwater volcano vent release gases and heat into the deep ocean at 1,418 m deep. These vents create new ecosystems where little other life live. There are many microbes that thrive in these extreme conditions known as thermophiles. The Balnearium lithotrophicum lives near the vent but not directly on it. At the source of the vent temperatures can be up to 290 °C but where the Balnearium lithotrophicum thrives, temperatures are around 70–75 °C. This classifies Balnearium lithotrophicum as a thermophile because it thrives in relatively extreme heat and pressure conditions.

== Environment ==
At this depth, there is no light and little oxygen, so Balnearium lithotrophicum is an obligate anaerobe bacterium. An obligate anaerobe is a bacterium that cannot survive in the presence of oxygen that is found in the atmosphere. Balnearium lithotrophicum is identified as a chemolithoautotroph, “eater of rock”, that reduces strictly inorganic compounds in order to survive. It gets its energy from metabolizing hydrogen from the black smoker chimney. The carbon source it uses to survive comes from the carbon dioxide in the water. Balnearium lithotrophicum can live in a pH between 5.0 and 7.0 but prefers 5.4. In addition, for growth the NaCl amount in the water should be between 0.8 and 5.6 percent. Ammonium is the main nitrogen source of Balnearium lithotrophicum. The genomic DNA had 34.6 mol% of C+G bases.

== Classification ==
The appearance of the Balnearium lithotrophicum is a short rod that is narrower in the middle. These organisms have been known to exist in this submarine ecosystem; however, Balnearium lithotrophicum was only recently separated from similar extremophiles. The close relatives it was divided from include Thermovibrio ruber and Desulfurobacterium thermolithotrophum. They share many features but were separated based on certain physiological characteristics that Balnearium lithotrophicum maintains.
