= Thermothrix thiopara =

Scientific classification
- Domain: Bacteria
- Kingdom: Pseudomonadati
- Phylum: Aquificota
- Class: Aquificia
- Order: Aquificales
- Family: Aquificaceae
- Genus: Thermothrix
- Species: T. thiopara

Binomial name
- Thermothrix thiopara Caldwell et al. 1981

Species of bacterium

Thermothrix thiopara is a Gram-negative, facultatively chemolithoautotrophic, thermophilic, motile bacterium with a single polar flagellum of the genus Thermothrix, isolated from a hot sulfur spring.
