= Trm1 =

Trm1 may refer to:

- TRNA (guanine26-N2/guanine27-N2)-dimethyltransferase
- TRNA (guanine26-N2)-dimethyltransferase
