= Desulfurella propionica =

Scientific classification
- Domain: Bacteria
- Kingdom: Pseudomonadati
- Phylum: Campylobacterota
- Class: Desulfurellia
- Order: Desulfurellales
- Family: Desulfurellaceae
- Genus: Desulfurella
- Species: D. propionica

Binomial name
- Desulfurella propionica Miroshnichenko 1998

Species of bacterium

Desulfurella propionica is a thermophilic sulfur-reducing eubacterium. It is Gram-negative, rod-shaped, non-motile, with type strain n U-8^{T} (=DSM 10410^{T}).
