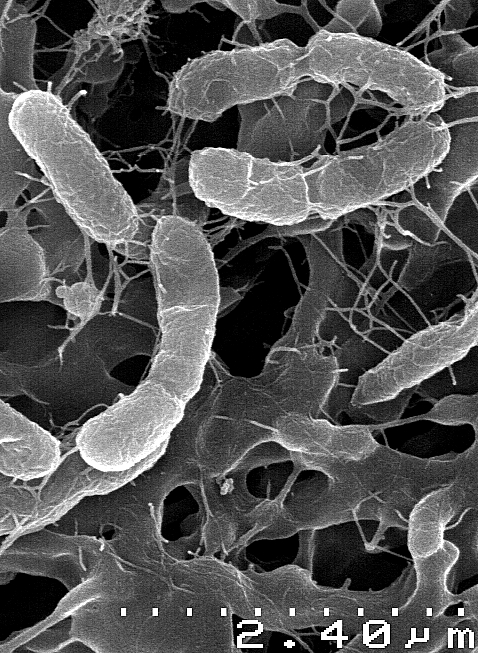
- Scanning electron microscopy image

Scientific classification
- Domain: Bacteria
- Kingdom: Pseudomonadati
- Phylum: Aquificota
- Class: Aquificia
- Order: Aquificales
- Family: Hydrogenothermaceae
- Genus: Venenivibrio
- Species: V. stagnispumantis

Binomial name
- Venenivibrio stagnispumantis Hetzer et al. 2008

= Venenivibrio stagnispumantis =

Strain CP.B2

Species of bacterium

Venenivibrio stagnispumantis strain CP.B2 is the first microorganisms isolated from the terrestrial hot spring Champagne Pool (75 °C, pH 5.5) in Waiotapu, New Zealand.

== Morphology ==
The cells are motile and slightly curved rods (1.04 to 1.56 μm long and 0.33 to 0.41 μm wide).

== Growth conditions ==
The novel bacterium is an obligate chemolithotroph capable of utilizing H_{2} as electron donor, O_{2} as corresponding electron acceptor and CO_{2} as carbon source. Venenivibrio stagnispumantis gains metabolic energy using the "Knallgas" reaction H_{2} + ½ O_{2} → H_{2}O. For growth either elemental sulphur (S^{0}) or thiosulfate (S_{2}O_{3}^{2−}) is required. Growth is observed under thermophilic conditions between 45 °C and 75 °C (optimum 70 °C), under moderate acidophilic conditions between pH 4.8 and 5.8 (optimum pH 5.4) and under microaerophilic conditions between 1.0% and 10.0% (v/v) O_{2} (optimum between 4.0% and 8.0% (v/v) O_{2}).

== Phylogeny ==
Phylogenetic analysis based on 16S rDNA sequences indicate that strain CP.B2 belongs to the order Aquificales and represents the type strain of a novel species of a new genus within the family Hydrogenothermaceae. The 16S rRNA gene sequence for strain CP.B2 is deposited in the GenBank nucleotide sequence database under accession number DQ989208. The G+C content of the genomic DNA is 29.3 mol% which is the lowest G+C content reported for a species of the order Aquificales.

== Tolerance to arsenic and antimony compounds ==
Venenivibrio stagnispumantis displays tolerance to relatively high concentrations of arsenic and antimony compounds. Cells grew in the presence of up to 8 mM arsenite (As^{3+}), 15 mM trivalent antimony (Sb^{3+}), and >20 mM arsenate (As^{5+}) but growth was not observed when As^{3+} and As^{5+} were provided as the sole electron donor and acceptor pair.

== Nomenclature ==
Ve.ne.ni.vi' bri.o. (Latin: the vibrio of poison) stag.ni.spu.man' tis. (Latin: from the bubbling pool, pertaining to Champagne Pool).

== Culture collection ==
Venenivibrio stagnispumantis strain CP.B2 is deposited in the Japan Collection of Microorganisms under JCM 14244, in the American Type Culture Collection under ATCC BAA-1398 and in the German Collection of Microorganisms under DSM 18763.

== Culture medium ==
| Venenivibrio stagnispumantis culture medium | |
|---|---|
| NaOH | 0.15 g |
| KCl | 0.50 g |
| MgCl_{2} • 6 H_{2}O | 1.36 g |
| MgSO_{4} • 7 H_{2}O | 7.00 g |
| Na_{2}S_{2}O_{3} • 5 H_{2}O | 2.00 g |
| CaCl_{2} • 2 H_{2}O | 0.40 g |
| NH_{4}Cl | 0.20 g |
| K_{2}HPO_{4} | 0.25 g |
| Trace minerals (100x) | 10.00 ml |
| MES | 1.95 g |
| Distilled water | make up to 1000.00 ml |

The pH of the medium is adjusted to 5.5, distributed into culture vessels and autoclaved under CO_{2}. After the inoculation the initial gas phase is replaced with H_{2} / CO_{2} / O_{2} (79% / 15% / 6%) and pressurized to 170 kPa.

| Trace mineral solution (100x) | |
|---|---|
| Na_{2}-EDTA • 2 H_{2}O | 500.00 mg |
| CoCl_{2} • 6 H_{2}O | 150.00 mg |
| MnCl_{2} • 4 H_{2}O | 100.00 mg |
| FeSO_{4} • 7 H_{2}O | 100.00 mg |
| ZnCl_{2} | 100.00 mg |
| AlCl_{3} • 6 H_{2}O | 40.00 mg |
| Na_{2}WO_{4} • 2 H_{2}O | 30.00 mg |
| CuCl_{2} • 2 H_{2}O | 20.00 mg |
| Ni_{2}SO_{4} • 6 H_{2}O | 20.00 mg |
| Na_{2}SeO_{3} | 10.00 mg |
| H_{3}BO_{3} | 10.00 mg |
| Na_{2}MoO_{4} • 2 H_{2}O | 10.00 mg |
| Distilled water | make up to 1000.00 ml |

The pH of the solution is adjusted to 3.0 with HCl.
