= Desulfurobacterium atlanticum =

Scientific classification
- Domain: Bacteria
- Kingdom: Pseudomonadati
- Phylum: Aquificota
- Class: Desulfurobacteriia
- Order: Desulfurobacteriales
- Family: Desulfurobacteriaceae
- Genus: Desulfurobacterium
- Species: D. atlanticum

Binomial name
- Desulfurobacterium atlanticum L'Haridon et al. 2006

Species of bacterium

Desulfurobacterium atlanticum is a thermophilic, anaerobic and chemolithoautotrophic bacterium from the family Desulfurobacteriaceae. In 2006 it was isolated from marine hydrothermal systems and proposed to become a new bacterial species.

== Characteristics ==
Desulfurobacterium atlanticum are sulphur-reducing, Gram-negative bacteria. They are straight or curved rods about 2.5-3.5 micrometers in length and 0.4-0.5 micrometers in width. D. atlanticum are a motile bacteria by flagella. These bacteria can occur in pairs, alone, or in chains of 5 to 6 bacteria long. They can use hydrogen as their electron donor and nitrate or sulphur as the electron acceptor. D. atlanticum can grow at temperatures between 50 °C and 80 °C, while optimal temperatures range between 70° and 75 °C. These bacteria can grow at pH ranges between 5 and 7.5, however preferred growth is at a pH of 6-6.2. D. atlanticum prefers low NaCl concentrations for optimal growth. Growth is also inhibited by several antibiotics, including: chloramphenicol, penicillin G and rifampicin.

== Significance in research ==
Desulfurobacterium atlanticum (strain SL22^{T}) was isolated from deep sea vents in the Mid-Atlantic Ridge and used to propose a new bacterial family. To determine its taxonomic status, 16S rRNA gene sequences of D. atlanticum were compared with several other bacterial species from the genus Desulfurobacterium. Compared to three closely related strains, D. atlanticum was sufficiently distinct to warrant status as a new species. Comparisons were made based on pH, morphology, optimal temperature growth, fatty acid composition, as well as their phylogenetic position and relationships to other bacteria. Desulfurobacterium atlanticum was proposed as a member of the order Aquificales, with a new genus (Desulfurobacterium).
