= Desulfurella kamchatkensis =

Scientific classification
- Domain: Bacteria
- Kingdom: Pseudomonadati
- Phylum: Campylobacterota
- Class: Desulfurellia
- Order: Desulfurellales
- Family: Desulfurellaceae
- Genus: Desulfurella
- Species: D. kamchatkensis

Binomial name
- Desulfurella kamchatkensis Miroshnichenko 1998

Species of bacterium

Desulfurella kamchatkensis is a thermophilic sulfur-reducing eubacterium. It is Gram-negative, rod-shaped, motile, with a single polar flagellum and type strain K-119^{T} (=DSM 10409^{T}).
