= "Aquifex aeolicus" =

- Transmission electron micrograph of "Aquifex aeolicus" samples

Scientific classification
- Domain: Bacteria
- Kingdom: Pseudomonadati
- Phylum: Aquificota
- Class: Aquificia
- Order: Aquificales
- Family: Aquificaceae
- Genus: Aquifex
- Species: "A. aeolicus"

Binomial name
- "Aquifex aeolicus" Huber and Stetter, 1992 - NB: Neither validly nor effectively published.

Species of bacterium

"Aquifex aeolicus" is a chemolithoautotrophic, Gram-negative, motile, hyperthermophilic bacterium. "A. aeolicus" is generally rod-shaped with an approximate length of 2-6 μm and a diameter of 0.4-0.5 μm. "A. aeolicus" is neither validly nor effectively published and, having no standing in nomenclature, should be styled in quotation marks. It is one of a handful of species in the Aquificota phylum, an unusual group of thermophilic bacteria that are thought to be some of the oldest species of bacteria, related to filamentous bacteria first observed at the turn of the century. "A. aeolicus" is also believed to be one of the earliest diverging species of thermophilic bacteria. "A. aeolicus" grows best in water between 85 °C and 95 °C, and can be found near underwater volcanoes or hot springs. It requires oxygen to survive but has been found to grow optimally under microaerophilic conditions. Due to its high stability against high temperature and lack of oxygen, "A. aeolicus" is a good candidate for biotechnological applications as it is believed to have potential to be used as hydrogenases in an attractive H2/O2 biofuel cell, replacing chemical catalysts. This can be useful for improving industrial processes.

== Microbiological characteristics ==
=== Morphology ===
Mature "A. aeolicus" cells are typically rod-shaped bacterium with an approximate length of 2-6 μm and a diameter of 0.4-0.5 μm. These cells are motile by means of a monopolar polytrichous flagella. Additionally, members of the species tend to form large cell conglomerations, of up to 100 individual cells. "A. aeolicus" can display pleomorphism based on variation in the environment.

=== Metabolism ===
As an autotroph, "A. aeolicus" has the ability to obtain all necessary carbon by fixing CO_{2} from the environment and utilizes molecular hydrogen as an electron/energy source. Additionally, this bacterium utilizes a reductive TCA cycle as it provides the substrates of many bio synthetic pathways. The "A. aeolicus" genome contains encoding genes that together could constituent the TCA pathway: fumarate reductase, fumarate hydratase, isocitrate dehydrogenase, malate dehydrogenase, ferredoxin oxidoreductase, succinate-CoA ligase, aconitase and citratesynthase. Moreover, this bacterium uses oxygen, hydrogen, and mineral salts as its primary energy sources. "A. aeolicus" can also reduce nitrogen and sulfur.

Regarding its growth under microaerophilic conditions, Aquifex species have been observed to grow in oxygen concentrations as long as 7.5ppm. It is hypothesized that this is possible because 1) their oxygen-respiration system was already highly developed before the advent of oxygenic photosynthesis, 2) the Aquifex lineage came to life after there was a rise in atmospheric oxygen, or 3) oxygen respiration was developed, and then transferred among different bacterial lineages, such as Aquifex. In response to oxidative stress, "A. aeolicus" possesses protective enzymes such as superoxide and peroxide to counter harmful oxygen species.

== Habitat ==
"Aquifex aeolicus" was originally isolated from underwater volcanic vents near the Aeolic Islands (north of Sicily) and has also been isolated from the hot springs in Yellowstone. As a hyperthermophile, "A. aeolicus" can survive up to 95 °C with a temperature optima of 85 °C with a pH optima of 6.8, ranging from 5.4 to 7.5.

== Genomic properties ==
"Aquifex aeolicus" is the first thermophilic bacterium to have its entire genome sequenced. Comparison of the "Aquifex aeolicus" genome to other organisms showed that around 16% of its genes originated from the Archaea domain. It is most closely related to the hydrogen-oxidizing bacterium, Aquifex pyrophilus, and its close relative, Hydrogenobacter thermophilus.

The genome of "A. aeolicus" has been successfully mapped, but was noted to be only one-third the size of the E. coli genome. The genome of "A. aeolicus" is densely packed while no introns or protein splicing elements were found. It possesses a circular chromosome with 1,551,335 bp and has a G+C content of 43.4%, and contains 1,796 genes. It also contains genes potentially coding for three distinct [NiFe] hydrogenases, however, it is thought that the Aquifex hydrogenases I and II function in energy conservation, where as hydrogenase III is more likely required for CO_{2}fixation. Additionally, during sequencing, a single extra chromosomal element (ECE) was identified, suggesting evidence of genetic exchange between the "A. aeolicus" chromosome and the ECE.

== Industrial applications ==
Multiple enzymes have been identified for potential future use due to their high stability and capacity to oxidize molecular hydrogen, producing byproducts of heat and water. A key enzyme of note is Hydrogenase I which was used to study the relationship of enzymes and electrodes during the development of H2-fed, energy-generating biofuel cells. Researchers have explored the use of another extremely resistant enzyme known as lumazine synthase. The cage-forming enzyme has been explored as potential drug delivery nano carrier as it was engineered to encapsulate other molecules.
