= Hippea maritima =

Scientific classification
- Domain: Bacteria
- Kingdom: Pseudomonadati
- Phylum: Campylobacterota
- Class: Desulfurellia
- Order: Desulfurellales
- Family: Desulfurellaceae
- Genus: Hippea
- Species: H. maritima

Binomial name
- Hippea maritima Miroshnichenko et al. 1999

Type strain
- ATCC 700847, DSM 10411, MH2

Species of bacterium

Hippea maritima is a bacterium from the genus Hippea which has been isolated from sediments from a hydrothermal vent from Matupi Harbour in Papua New Guinea.
