= Persephonella guaymasensis =

Scientific classification
- Domain: Bacteria
- Kingdom: Pseudomonadati
- Phylum: Aquificota
- Class: Aquificia
- Order: Aquificales
- Family: Hydrogenothermaceae
- Genus: Persephonella
- Species: P. guaymasensis

Binomial name
- Persephonella guaymasensis Götz et al. 2002

Species of bacterium

Persephonella guaymasensis is a thermophilic, hydrogen-oxidizing microaerophile first isolated from a deep-sea hydrothermal vent. It is strictly chemolithoautotrophic, microaerophilic, motile, 2-4 micrometres in size, rod-shaped, Gram-negative and non-sporulating. Its type strain is EX-H2^{T}.
