= Desulfurella multipotens =

Scientific classification
- Domain: Bacteria
- Kingdom: Pseudomonadati
- Phylum: Campylobacterota
- Class: Desulfurellia
- Order: Desulfurellales
- Family: Desulfurellaceae
- Genus: Desulfurella
- Species: D. multipotens

Binomial name
- Desulfurella multipotens Miroshnichenko et al. 1996

Species of bacterium

Desulfurella multipotens is a thermophilic sulfur-reducing eubacterium. It is 1.5–1.8 by 0.5–0.7 μm in size, Gram-negative, rod-shaped, motile, with a single polar flagellum.
