= Hydrogenobacter thermophilus =

Scientific classification
- Domain: Bacteria
- Kingdom: Pseudomonadati
- Phylum: Aquificota
- Order: Aquificales
- Family: Aquificaceae
- Genus: Hydrogenobacter
- Species: H. thermophilus

Binomial name
- Hydrogenobacter thermophilus Kawasumi et al. 1984

Species of bacterium

Hydrogenobacter thermophilus is an extremely thermophilic, straight rod (bacillus) bacterium. TK-6 is the type strain for this species. It is a Gram negative, non-motile, obligate chemolithoautotroph. It belongs to one of the earliest branching order of Bacteria. H. thermophilus TK-6 lives in soil that contains hot water. It was one of the first hydrogen oxidizing bacteria described leading to the discovery, and subsequent examination of many unique proteins involved in its metabolism. Its discovery contradicted the idea that no obligate hydrogen oxidizing bacteria existed, leading to a new understanding of this physiological group. Additionally, H. thermophilus contains a fatty acid composition that had not been observed before.

== History ==
Hydrogenobacter thermophilus TK-6 was originally discovered by Toshiyuki Kawasumi at the Department of Agricultural Chemistry, University of Tokyo in 1980. TK-6 was found with four other previously unknown hydrogen oxidizing bacteria. The bacterium was isolated from hot water containing soils samples from mines of the Izu Peninsula, Japan. The colonies were isolated onto a medium made of 1.5% Bacto-Agar and a specific trace element solution consisting of MoO_{3}, ZnSO_{4}·H_{2}O, CuSO_{4}·5H_{2}O, H_{3}BO_{3}, MnSO_{4}·H_{2}O and CoCl_{2}·H_{2}O. Prior to the discovery of Hydrogenobacter thermophilus, only one extremely thermophilic, aerobic and hydrogen-oxidizing bacterium had been described (Bacillus schlegelii). In addition, H. thermophilus has both morphological and physiological differences that vary from processes in B. schegelii, suggesting there are multiple means for being viable in different environments. Until the discovery of H. thermophilus, it was thought that no obligate chemolithotrophic hydrogen oxidizing bacteria existed.

== Characterization ==
=== Biology ===
Hydrogenobacter thermophilus is a straight rod (bacillus) bacterium and an extreme thermophile. The size is about .3-.5 microns in width and 2-3 microns in length. Gram staining was done using a Hucker Modification and the reaction was found to be Gram negative. Motility and sporulation were tested using hanging cell method and Dorner method, respectively, and both were found to be negative. The novel fatty acid composition was freed though a nicotinamide adenine dinucleotide phosphate containing solution. The composition was found to be C18:0, C 20:1, 2 carbons longer than any composition seen before. The optimum growth conditions are: temperature between 70 and 75 °C, freshwater, pH around 7.2. The habitat is soil that contains hot, fresh water (70-75 °C) from springs of the Izu Peninsula, Japan.

=== Metabolism ===
Hydrogenobacter thermophilus is an obligate chemolithoautotroph. H. thermophilus undergoes aerobic respiration or anaerobic respiration via denitrification. The electron donor is the molecular form of hydrogen, thiosulfate, or elemental sulfur. Nitrogen sources are Ammonium and Nitrate salts. This bacterium utilizes a special form of the reductive tricyclic acid cycle (Reverse Krebs cycle) to fix CO_{2}. Various metabolic processes were examined on a 1.5% Bacto-Agar with various organic compounds, incubated at 50-70 degrees C.

== Phylogeny ==
16S rRNA gene sequencing places the family of H. thermophilus, Aquificaceae, in close phylogenetic relationship to the family Aquifex based on 88.5% to 88.9% sequence similarity. H. thermophilus’s next immediate branch point is with the species Caldobacterium hydrogenopailum str. z-823 and the previous divergence branches with Hydrogenobacter strains. Genomic studies of the 16S ribosomal RNA gene in H. thermophilus also suggest that they are part of some of the earliest differentiating orders of bacteria termed the Aquificales. As a result of the early branch point in Aquificales’ genetic history, it indicates that the characteristics of the last common ancestor of life were possibly thermophilic and fixed carbon chemoautotrophically; this gives some direction to the evolution of life.

== Genomics ==
In 2010, the entire genome of Hydrogenobacter thermophilus TK-6 was sequenced by Hiroyuki Arai et al. Sequencing was done via whole genome shotgun approach through the Sanger sequencing method, and assembled via the Paracel Genome Assembler. It was found to consist of 1,743,135 base pairs arranged in a circular chromosome with an estimated 1,864 protein coding genes and 22 pseudogenes. The genome was found to contain one 16S-23S-5S rRNA operon and 44 tRNA coding genes. The GC content of the genome is 44%, which at the time of its discovery was the lowest among any hydrogen oxidizing bacteria. H. thermophilus contains four gene clusters for membrane-bound hydrogenases. It should also be noted that H. thermophilus lacks the typical PSP (phosphoserine phosphatase) genes involved in amino acid metabolism. In addition, it is an obligate chemolithoautotroph, and so genes commonly used in carbon fixation were present. Genes that encode proteins involved in the RTCA (reductive tricyclic acid cycle) and gluconeogenesis were observed. The sox gene cluster, sqr gene and sorAB genes were also noted, and are involved in the sulfur oxidation protein complex, sulfide:quinone oxidoreductase and sulfite:cytochrome c oxidoreductase respectively. H. thermophilus also contains the necessary genes for nitrate reduction and assimilation.

== Proteomics ==
Hydrogenobacter thermophilus has several unique proteins that allow it to be viable in its environment. Cytochrome b and cytochrome c are present in all strains. H. thermophilus strains also possess a very distinctive sulfur containing quinone, 2-Methylthio-1,4-naphthoquinone. This is the first case of non-Calvin-type pathway that is utilized to convert carbon dioxide into cellular components. In addition to the unique quinone, novel types of phosphoserine phosphatase (PSPs) were discovered and have been analyzed by preliminary crystallization and X-ray diffraction. Both iPSP1 and iPSP2 proteins found in H. thermophilus employ metal-ion-independent pathways while typical PSPs need Mg2+ for activity and are considered to be part of the haloacid dehalogenase-like hydrolase superfamily. iPSP1 is composed of two PspA subunits, while iPSP2 is a heterodimer and has both PspA and PspB subunits. iPSP1 and iPSP2 were observed to share a strong binding affinity towards L-phosphoserine, which supports its activity as a PSP. Novel proteins such as citryl-CoA synthetase (CCS) and ciitryl-CoA (CLL)are utilized within the reductive TCA cycle (Reverse Krebs cycle). These proteins were discovered and characterized through activity purification, SDS-PAGE analysis, and gel filtration chromatography. Additionally, oligionucleotide probes were employed in order to sequence and clone the related genes. The cleavage of citryl-CoA to acetyl-CoA and oxaloacetate occurs in a two step process. First, citryl-coA synthetase catalyzes the formation of citryl-CoA, which is immediately cleaved by citryl-CoA lyase. It was also observed that there is significant level of protein sequence homology between the CCL protein and the C-terminal region of ATP citrate lyase (ACL), an enzyme commonly employed by the reductive TCA cycle.
