= Desulfurella amilsii =

Scientific classification
- Domain: Bacteria
- Kingdom: Pseudomonadati
- Phylum: Campylobacterota
- Class: Desulfurellia
- Order: Desulfurellales
- Family: Desulfurellaceae
- Genus: Desulfurella
- Species: D. amilsii

Binomial name
- Desulfurella amilsii Florentino et al. 2016

Type strain
- DSM 29984, JCM 30680, TR1

Species of bacterium

Desulfurella amilsii is a Gram-negative, non-spore-forming, obligately anaerobic, sulfur-reducing, acidotolerant, moderately thermophilic, and motile bacterium from the genus of Desulfurella which has been isolated from river sediments from the Tinto River in Spain.

== Metabolism ==
Desulfurella amilsii is able to utilize elemental sulfur and thiosulfate as electron acceptors and various organic compounds (e.g. formate) as electron donors, to disproportionate elemental sulfur, as well as to ferment pyruvate.
