= Phorcysia =

Scientific classification
- Domain: Bacteria
- Kingdom: Pseudomonadati
- Phylum: Aquificota
- Class: Desulfurobacteriia
- Order: Desulfurobacteriales
- Family: Desulfurobacteriaceae
- Genus: Phorcysia; Pérez-Rodríguez et al. 2012

Type species
- Phorcysia thermohydrogeniphila Pérez-Rodríguez et al. 2012

Species
- P. thermohydrogeniphila

Synonyms
- Phorcysium

Genus of bacteria

Phorcysia is a bacteria genus from the family Desulfurobacteriaceae.

== See also ==
- List of bacterial orders
- List of bacteria genera
