= Hippea alviniae =

Scientific classification
- Domain: Bacteria
- Kingdom: Pseudomonadati
- Phylum: Campylobacterota
- Class: Desulfurellia
- Order: Desulfurellales
- Family: Desulfurellaceae
- Genus: Hippea
- Species: H. alviniae

Binomial name
- Hippea alviniae Flores et al. 2012

Type strain
- DSM 24586, EP5-r, OCM 986

Species of bacterium

Hippea alviniae is a thermoacidophilic and obligately anaerobic bacterium from the genus Hippea which has been isolated from a hydrothermal vent from the East Pacific Rise.
