= UDP-3-O-N-acetylglucosamine deacetylase =

Enzyme

UDP-3-O-acyl N-acetylglycosamine deacetylase
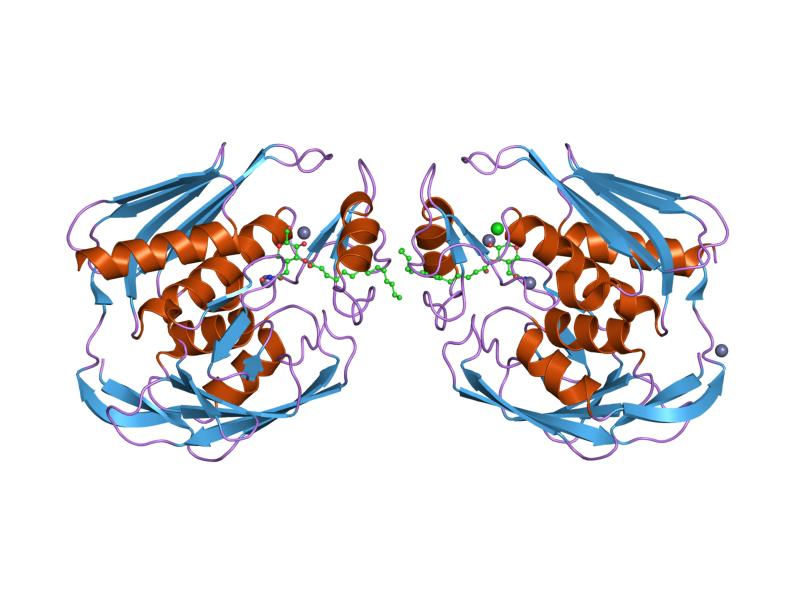
- crystal structure of aquifex aeolicus lpxc complexed with tu-514

Identifiers
- Symbol: LpxC
- Pfam: PF03331
- Pfam clan: CL0329
- InterPro: IPR004463
- SCOP2: 1nzt / SCOPe / SUPFAM
- CAZy: CE11
Available protein structures:
- PDB: IPR004463 PF03331 (ECOD; PDBsum)
- AlphaFold: IPR004463; PF03331

In molecular biology, UDP-3-O-N-acetylglucosamine deacetylase (also known as UDP-3-O-[3-hydroxymyristoyl] N-acetylglucosamine deacetylase or UDP-3-O-acyl-GlcNAc deacetylase), EC 3.5.1.-, is a bacterial enzyme involved in lipid A biosynthesis.

It is a zinc-dependent metalloamidase that catalyses the second and committed step in the biosynthesis of lipid A. Lipid A anchors lipopolysaccharide (the major constituent of the outer membrane) into the membrane in Gram negative bacteria. It shows no homology to mammalian metalloamidases and is essential for cell viability, making it an important target for the development of novel antibacterial compounds. The structure of UDP-3-O-N-acetylglucosamine deacetylase (LpxC) from Aquifex aeolicus has a two-layer alpha/beta structure similar to that of the second domain of ribosomal protein S5, only in LpxC there is a duplication giving two structural repeats of this fold, each repeat being elaborated with additional structures forming the active site. LpxC contains a zinc-binding motif, which resides at the base of an active site cleft and adjacent to a hydrophobic tunnel occupied by a fatty acid. This tunnel accounts for the specificity of LpxC toward substrates and inhibitors bearing appropriately positioned 3-O-fatty acid substituents.
