= Hippea =

Scientific classification
- Domain: Bacteria
- Kingdom: Pseudomonadati
- Phylum: Campylobacterota
- Class: Desulfurellia
- Order: Desulfurellales
- Family: Desulfurellaceae
- Genus: Hippea; Miroshnichenko et al. 1999

Type species
- Hippea maritima Miroshnichenko et al. 1999

Species
- H. alviniae; H. jasoniae; H. maritima

Genus of bacteria

Hippea is an obligate anaerobic and moderately thermophilic bacteria genus from the family Desulfurellaceae. Hippea is named after the German microbiologist Hans Hippe.

== Phylogeny ==
The currently accepted taxonomy is based on the List of Prokaryotic names with Standing in Nomenclature (LPSN) and National Center for Biotechnology Information (NCBI).

16S rRNA based LTP_10_2024

- Hippea
  - H. alviniae
  - - H. jasoniae
    - H. maritima

120 marker proteins based GTDB 10-RS226

- Hippea
  - H. maritima Miroshnichenko et al. 1999
  - - H. alviniae Flores et al. 2012
    - H. jasoniae Flores et al. 2012

== See also ==
- List of bacterial orders
- List of bacteria genera
