= Glucosylglycerate synthase =

Class of enzymes

Identifiers
- EC no.: 2.4.1.268

Databases
- IntEnz: IntEnz view
- BRENDA: BRENDA entry
- ExPASy: NiceZyme view
- KEGG: KEGG entry
- MetaCyc: metabolic pathway
- PRIAM: profile
- PDB structures: RCSB PDB PDBe PDBsum
Search
- PMC: articles
- PubMed: articles
- NCBI: proteins

Glucosylglycerate synthase (EC 2.4.1.268, Ggs (gene)) is an enzyme with systematic name ADP-glucose:D-glycerate 2-alpha-D-glucosyltransferase. It catalyses the following chemical reaction

D-glyceric acid
+ ADP-glucose
ADP
2-O-(α-D-glucopyranosyl)-D-glyceric acid

The enzyme characterised from Persephonella marina transfers a glucosyl group from adenosine diphosphate glucose to D-glyceric acid, giving 2-O-(α-D-glucopyranosyl)-D-glyceric acid (glucosylglycerate), with adenosine diphosphate (ADP) as a byproduct. It has also been found in Petrotoga mobilis. In both these thermophilic organisms, the product protects againt osmotic stress.
