= Desulfurobacterium thermolithotrophum =

Scientific classification
- Domain: Bacteria
- Kingdom: Pseudomonadati
- Phylum: Aquificota
- Class: Desulfurobacteriia
- Order: Desulfurobacteriales
- Family: Desulfurobacteriaceae
- Genus: Desulfurobacterium
- Species: D. thermolithotrophum

Binomial name
- Desulfurobacterium thermolithotrophum L'Haridon et al. 1998

Species of bacterium

Desulfurobacterium thermolithotrophum is a species of autotrophic, sulphur-reducing bacterium isolated from a deep-sea hydrothermal vent. It is the type species of its genus, being thermophilic, anaerobic, Gram-negative, motile and rod-shaped, with type strain BSA^{T} (= DSM 11699^{T}).
