= Desulfurobacteriaceae =

Scientific classification
- Domain: Bacteria
- Kingdom: Pseudomonadati
- Phylum: Aquificota
- Class: Desulfurobacteriia
- Order: Desulfurobacteriales; Gupta and Lali 2014
- Family: Desulfurobacteriaceae; L'Haridon et al. 2006

Genera
- Balnearium; Desulfurobacterium; Phorcysia; Thermovibrio

Family of bacteria

Desulfurobacteriaceae is a family of bacteria belonging to the Aquificota phylum.

== Phylogeny ==
16S rRNA based LTP_10_2024

- - Phorcysia thermohydrogeniphila Pérez-Rodríguez et al. 2012
  - - - Balnearium lithotrophicum Takai et al. 2003
      - - Thermovibrio
          - T. ruber Huber et al. 2002
          - - T. ammonificans Vetriani et al. 2004
            - T. guaymasensis L'Haridon et al. 2006
    - - Desulfurobacterium
        - D. thermolithotrophum L'Haridon et al. 1998
        - - D. pacificum L'Haridon et al. 2006
          - - D. atlanticum L'Haridon et al. 2006
            - D. indicum Cao et al. 2017

120 marker proteins based GTDB 10-RS226

- - - Desulfurobacterium_A
      - Desulfurobacterium atlanticum
      - Desulfurobacterium indicum
  - - Desulfurobacterium pacificum
    - - - Desulfurobacterium thermolithotrophum
        - Phorcysia thermohydrogeniphila
      - - Balnearium lithotrophicum
        - - Thermovibrio
            - T. ammonificans
            - T. guaymasensis

== Taxonomy ==
The currently accepted taxonomy is based on the List of Prokaryotic names with Standing in Nomenclature (LSPN) and National Center for Biotechnology Information (NCBI).

- Class Desulfurobacteriia Chuvochina et al. 2024
  - Order Desulfurobacteriales Gupta & Lali 2014
    - Family Desulfurobacteriaceae L'Haridon et al. 2006 em. Gupta & Lali 2013
      - Genus Balnearium Takai et al. 2003
        - Species B. lithotrophicum Takai et al. 2003
      - Genus Desulfurobacterium L'Haridon et al. 1998 emend. L'Haridon et al. 2006
        - Species D. atlanticum L'Haridon et al. 2006
        - Species "D. crinifex" Alain et al. 2003
        - Species D. indicum Cao et al. 2017
        - Species D. pacificum L'Haridon et al. 2006
        - Species D. thermolithotrophum L'Haridon et al. 1998 (type sp.)
      - Genus Phorcysia Pérez-Rodríguez et al. 2012
        - Species P. thermohydrogeniphila Pérez-Rodríguez et al. 2012
      - Genus Thermovibrio Huber et al. 2002
        - Species T. ammonificans Vetriani et al. 2004
        - Species T. guaymasensis L'Haridon et al. 2006
        - Species T. ruber Huber et al. 2002 (type sp.)
