= Desulfurella acetivorans =

Scientific classification
- Domain: Bacteria
- Kingdom: Pseudomonadati
- Phylum: Campylobacterota
- Class: Desulfurellia
- Order: Desulfurellales
- Family: Desulfurellaceae
- Genus: Desulfurella
- Species: D. acetivorans

Binomial name
- Desulfurella acetivorans Bonch-Osmolovskaya et al. 1993

Species of bacterium

Desulfurella acetivorans is a thermophilic acetate-oxidizing sulfur-reducing eubacterium. It is Gram-negative, short rod-shaped, motile, with a single polar flagellum.
