= Thermothrix azorensis =

Scientific classification
- Domain: Bacteria
- Kingdom: Pseudomonadati
- Phylum: Aquificota
- Class: Aquificia
- Order: Aquificales
- Family: Aquificaceae
- Genus: Thermothrix
- Species: T. azorensis

Binomial name
- Thermothrix azorensis Odintsova et al. 1996

Species of bacterium

Thermothrix azorensis is a Gram-negative, facultatively chemolithoautotrophic, non-spore-forming, aerobic, thermophilic, sulfur-oxidizing bacterium of the genus Thermothrix, isolated from a hot spring on Sao Miguel Island in the Azores. T. azorensis uses thiosulfate, tetrathionate, hydrogen sulfide, and elemental sulfur for its sources of energy (chemolithoautotrophic).
