= Hydrogenobacter =

Scientific classification
- Domain: Bacteria
- Kingdom: Pseudomonadati
- Phylum: Aquificota
- Class: Aquificia
- Order: Aquificales
- Family: Aquificaceae
- Genus: Hydrogenobacter; Kawasumi et al. 1984

Type species
- Hydrogenobacter thermophilus Kawasumi et al. 1984

Species
- "H. halophilus"; H. hydrogenophilus; H. subterraneus; H. thermophilus

Synonyms
- Calderobacterium Kryukov et al. 1984

Genus of bacteria

Hydrogenobacter is a genus of bacteria, one of the few in the phylum Aquificota. Type species is H. thermophilus. This genus belongs to Bacteria as opposed to the other inhabitants of extreme environments, the Archaea.

== Phylogeny ==
The currently accepted taxonomy is based on the List of Prokaryotic names with Standing in Nomenclature (LPSN) and National Center for Biotechnology Information (NCBI).

16S rRNA based LTP_01_2022

- - - Hydrogenobacter subterraneus Takai et al. 2001
    - Thermothrix azorensis Odintsova et al. 1996
  - - Hydrogenobacter
      - H. hydrogenophilus (Kryukov et al. 1984) Stöhr et al. 2001
      - H. thermophilus Kawasumi et al. 1984 (type sp.)

120 marker proteins based GTDB 10-RS226

- Hydrogenobacter
  - H. hydrogenophilus
  - H. thermophilus

== See also ==
- List of bacterial orders
- List of bacteria genera
