= Desulfurella =

Scientific classification
- Domain: Bacteria
- Kingdom: Pseudomonadati
- Phylum: Campylobacterota
- Class: Desulfurellia
- Order: Desulfurellales
- Family: Desulfurellaceae
- Genus: Desulfurella; Bonch-Osmolovskaya etal. 1993

Type species
- Desulfurella acetivorans Bonch-Osmolovskaya et al. 1993

Species
- D. acetivorans; D. amilsii; D. kamchatkensis; D. multipotens; D. propionica

Genus of bacteria

Desulfurella is a lithoautotrophic bacteria genus from the family Desulfurellaceae.

== Phylogeny ==
The currently accepted taxonomy is based on the List of Prokaryotic names with Standing in Nomenclature (LPSN) and National Center for Biotechnology Information (NCBI).

16S rRNA based LTP_10_2024

- Desulfurella
  - D. amilsii Florentino et al. 2016
  - - D. kamchatkensis Miroshnichenko et al. 1998
    - - D. propionica Miroshnichenko et al. 1998
      - - D. acetivorans Bonch-Osmolovskaya et al. 1993
        - D. multipotens Miroshnichenko et al. 1996

120 marker proteins based GTDB 10-RS226

- Desulfurella
  - D. amilsii
  - D. acetivorans [incl. D. multipotens]

== See also ==
- List of bacterial orders
- List of bacteria genera
