= 2-oxoglutarate synthase =

Class of enzymes

Identifiers
- EC no.: 1.2.7.3
- CAS no.: 37251-05-1

Databases
- IntEnz: IntEnz view
- BRENDA: BRENDA entry
- ExPASy: NiceZyme view
- KEGG: KEGG entry
- MetaCyc: metabolic pathway
- PRIAM: profile
- PDB structures: RCSB PDB PDBe PDBsum
- Gene Ontology: AmiGO / QuickGO
Search
- PMC: articles
- PubMed: articles
- NCBI: proteins

In enzymology, 2-oxoglutarate synthase (EC 1.2.7.3) is an enzyme that catalyzes the chemical reaction

succinyl-CoA
+ 2 reduced
ferredoxin
CO_{2} + 2 H^{+}
CO_{2} + 2 H^{+}
2-oxoglutaric acid
+ coenzyme A
+ 2 oxidised
ferredoxin

The substrates of this enzyme are succinyl-CoA, reduced ferredoxin, carbon dioxide and two protons. Its products are 2-oxoglutaric acid, coenzyme A, and oxidized ferredoxin. This reaction is part of the reverse Krebs cycle, as a means of carbon fixation.

This enzyme belongs to the family of oxidoreductases, specifically those acting on the aldehyde or oxo group of donor with an iron-sulfur protein as acceptor. The systematic name of this enzyme class is 2-oxoglutarate:ferredoxin oxidoreductase (decarboxylating). Other names in common use include 2-ketoglutarate ferredoxin oxidoreductase, 2-oxoglutarate:ferredoxin oxidoreductase, KGOR, 2-oxoglutarate ferredoxin oxidoreductase, and 2-oxoglutarate:ferredoxin 2-oxidoreductase (CoA-succinylating). In the direction from 2-oxoglutaric acid to succinyl-CoA the enzyme is part of the citric acid cycle.
