= Kolbeinsey Ridge =

Segment of the Mid-Atlantic Ridge north of Iceland in the Arctic Ocean

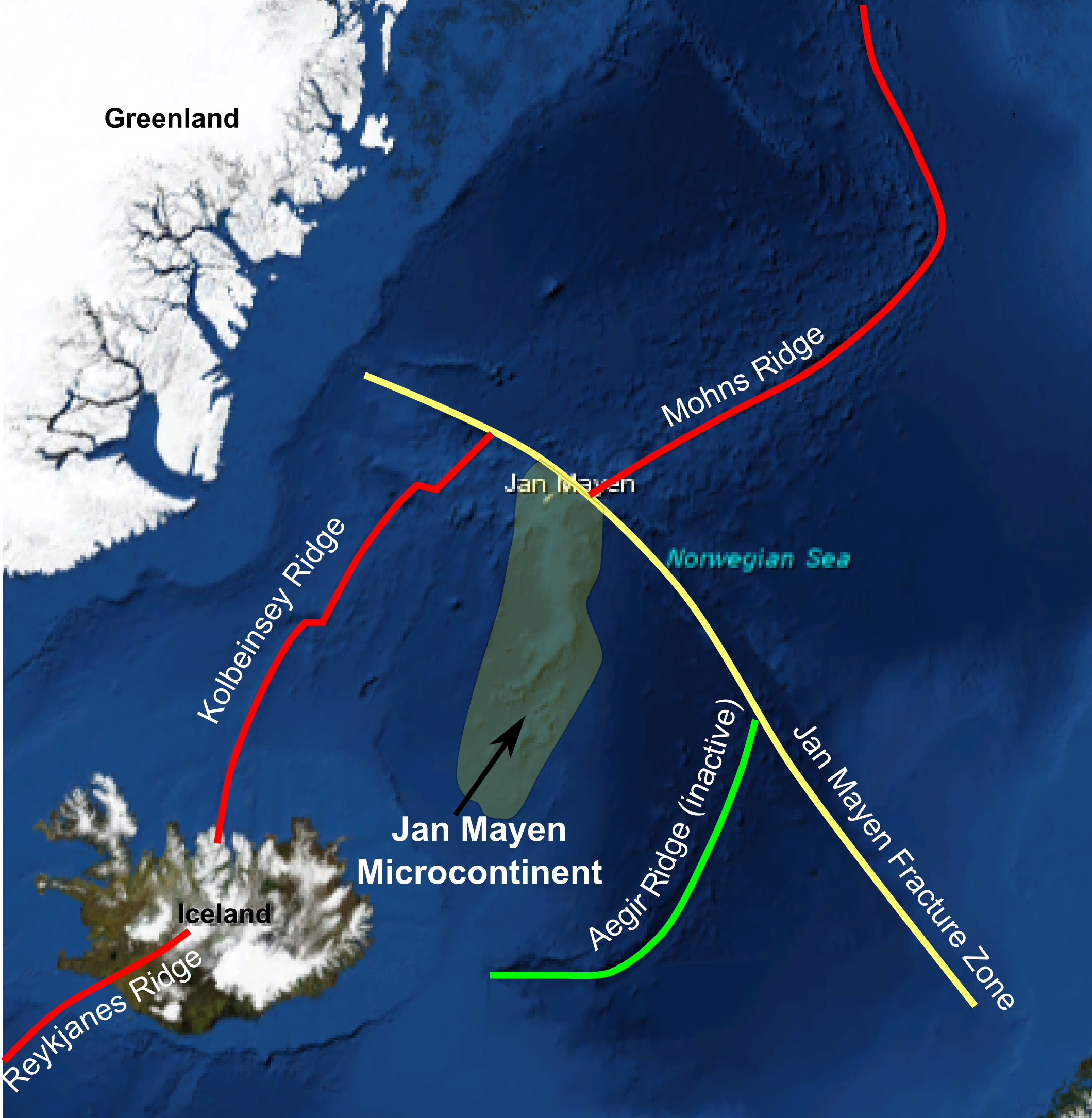
Map showing the location of the Kolbeinsey Ridge and other major geological features of the northernmost Atlantic

The Kolbeinsey Ridge is a segment of the Mid-Atlantic Ridge located to the north of Iceland in the Arctic Ocean. It is bounded to the south by the Tjörnes Fracture Zone, which connects the submarine ridge to the on-shore Northern Volcanic Zone rifting center in eastern Iceland. The volcanic islands Kolbeinsey and Grímsey lie along the Kolbeinsey Ridge.

== Bacteria ==
In 1992, Robert Huber and Karl Stetter discovered a new species of thermophilic bacteria here and named it A. pyrophilus.

== See also ==
- Aegir Ridge
- Squid forest
