= TRNA (guanine26-N2/guanine27-N2)-dimethyltransferase =

Enzyme

TRNA (guanine^{26}-N^{2}/guanine27-N^{2})-dimethyltransferase

Identifiers
- EC no.: 2.1.1.215

Databases
- IntEnz: IntEnz view
- BRENDA: BRENDA entry
- ExPASy: NiceZyme view
- KEGG: KEGG entry
- MetaCyc: metabolic pathway
- PRIAM: profile
- PDB structures: RCSB PDB PDBe PDBsum
Search
- PMC: articles
- PubMed: articles
- NCBI: proteins

TRNA (guanine^{26}-N^{2}/guanine^{27}-N^{2})-dimethyltransferase (EC 2.1.1.215, Trm1, tRNA (N^{2},N^{2}-guanine)-dimethyltransferase, tRNA (m2(2G26) methyltransferase, Trm1[tRNA (m2(2)G26) methyltransferase]) is an enzyme with systematic name S-adenosyl-L-methionine:tRNA (guanine^{26}-N^{2}/guanine^{27}-N^{2})-dimethyltransferase. This enzyme catalyses the following chemical reaction

4 S-adenosyl-L-methionine + guanine^{26}/guanine^{27} in tRNA $\rightleftharpoons$ 4 S-adenosyl-L-homocysteine + N^{2}-dimethylguanine^{26}/N^{2}-dimethylguanine^{27} in tRNA

The enzyme from Aquifex aeolicus is similar to the TRM1 methyltransferases of archaea and eukarya.
