= Squid Forest =

Extinct hydrothermal vent field in the North Atlantic

- An extinct series of hydrothermal vents near 68° N on the Kolbeinsey Ridge.
- Location within Earth
- Location: Kolbeinsey Ridge
- Coordinates: 68°0′0″N 17°30′0″W
- Min. elevation: 900 metres (3,000 ft)

Squid Forest (Akkarsgogen in Norwegian literature) is an extinct hydrothermal vent field on the Kolbeinsey Ridge, approximately 900 metres (3,000 ft) deep. As with many active vent sites, Squid Forest is a massive sulfide deposit.

== Discovery and description ==
Squid forest was discovered in 1999 during a research cruise of the R/V Håkon Mosby. It consists of two formerly-venting sites, estimated to have vented at 250–300 °C (482–572 °F) to form pyrrhotite, sphalerite, and barite minerals in the mounds.

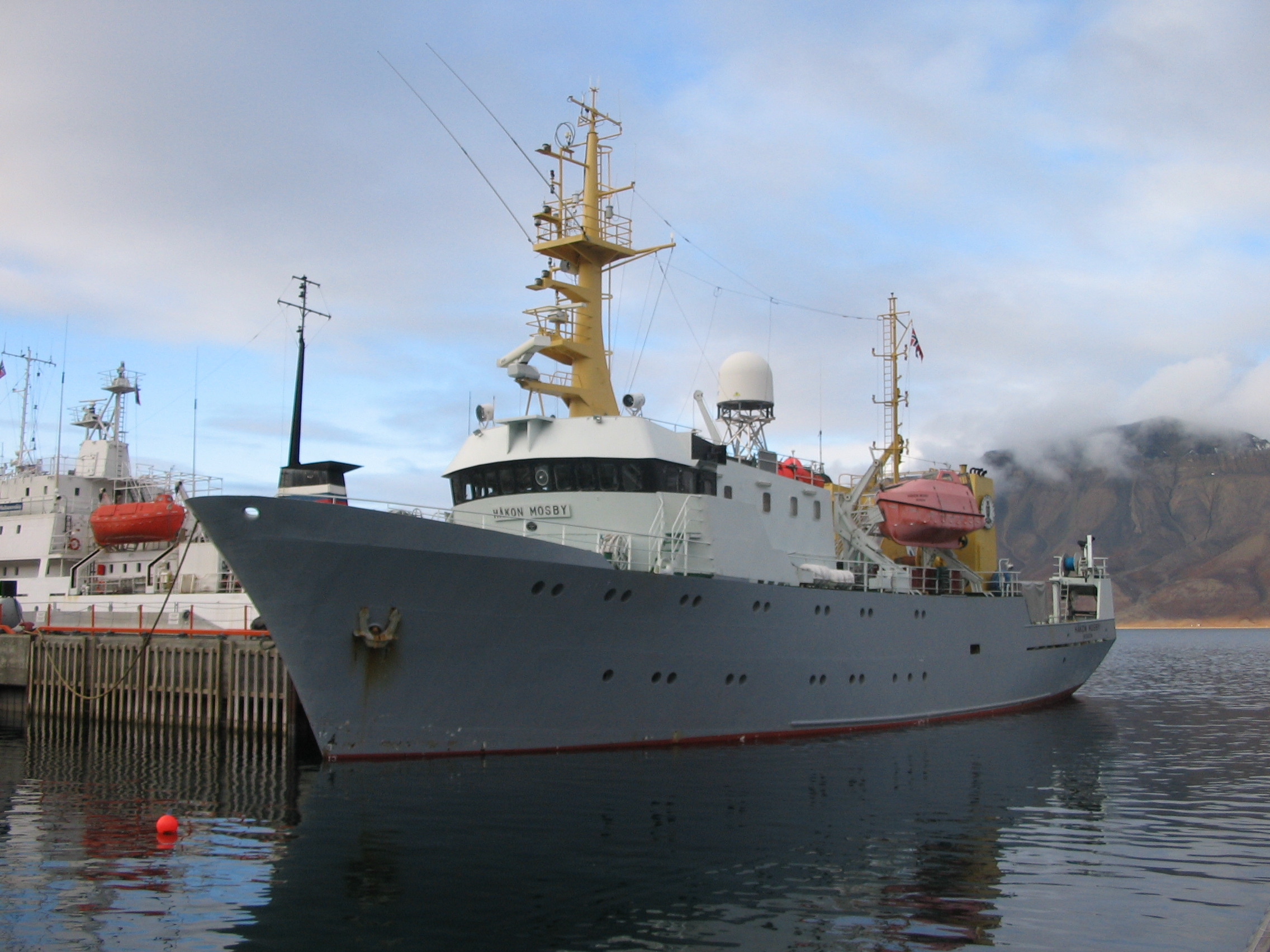
R/V Häkon Mosby pictured in 2007, the ship that discovered Squid Forest.
