= Thermocrinis minervae =

Scientific classification
- Domain: Bacteria
- Kingdom: Pseudomonadati
- Phylum: Aquificota
- Order: Aquificales
- Family: Aquificaceae
- Genus: Thermocrinis
- Species: T. minervae

Binomial name
- Thermocrinis minervae Caldwell et al. 2010

Species of bacterium

Thermocrinis minervae is a bacterium. Its cells are gram-negative and are approximately 2.4–3.9 micrometres long and 0.5–0.6 micrometres wide; they are motile rods with polar flagella. It grows in temperatures between 65 °C (149 °F) and 85 °C (185 °F). Its type strain is CR11^{T} (=5DSM 19557^{T} =5ATCC BAA-1533^{T}).
