= Reverse Krebs cycle =

Biochemical reaction sequence

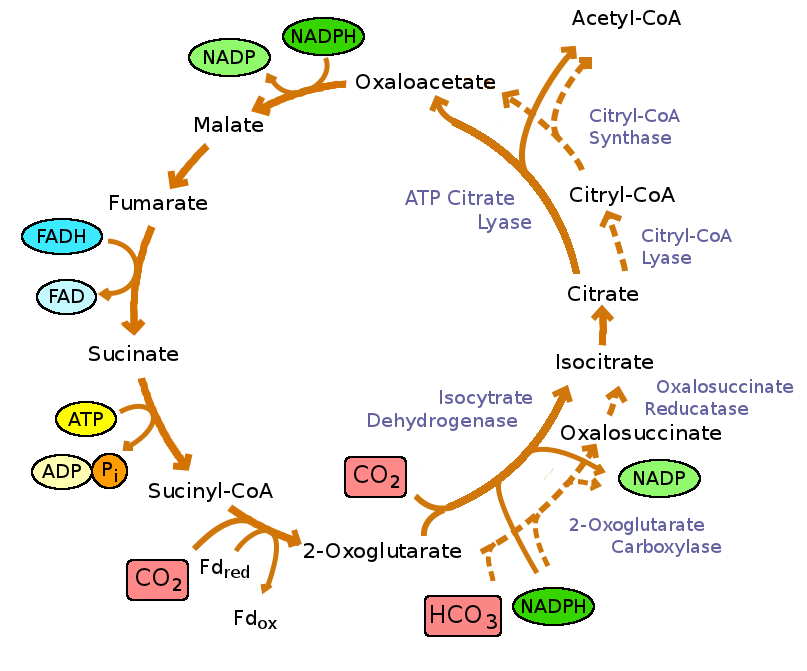
The Reductive/Reverse TCA Cycle (rTCA cycle). Shown are all of the reactants, intermediates and products for this cycle.

The reverse Krebs cycle (also known as the reverse tricarboxylic acid cycle, the reverse TCA cycle, or the reverse citric acid cycle, or the reductive tricarboxylic acid cycle, the reductive TCA cycle, or rTCA) is a sequence of chemical reactions that are used by some bacteria and archaea to produce carbon compounds from carbon dioxide and water by the use of energy-rich reducing agents as electron donors.

The reaction is the citric acid cycle run in reverse. Where the Krebs cycle takes carbohydrates and oxidizes them to CO_{2} and water, the reverse cycle takes CO_{2} and H_{2}O to make carbon compounds. This process is used by some bacteria (such as Aquificota) to synthesize carbon compounds, sometimes using hydrogen, sulfide, or thiosulfate as electron donors. This process can be seen as an alternative to the fixation of inorganic carbon in the Calvin cycle which occurs in a wide variety of microbes and higher organisms.

== Differences from Krebs cycle ==
In contrast to the oxidative citric acid cycle, the reverse or reductive cycle has a few key differences. There are three enzymes specific to the reductive citric acid cycle – citrate lyase, fumarate reductase, and α-ketoglutarate synthase.

The splitting of citric acid to oxaloacetate and acetate is usually catalyzed by citrate lyase, rather than the reverse reaction of citrate synthase. The exceptions are Thermosulfidibacter takaii and Desulfurella acetivorans which truly run the synthase in reverse.

Succinate dehydrogenase is replaced by fumarate reductase and α-ketoglutarate synthase replaces α-ketoglutarate dehydrogenase.

The conversion of succinate to 2-oxoglutarate is also different. In the oxidative reaction this step is coupled to the reduction of NADH. However, the oxidation of 2-oxoglutarate to succinate is so energetically favorable, that NADH lacks the reductive power to drive the reverse reaction. In the rTCA cycle, this reaction has to use a reduced low potential ferredoxin – 2-oxoglutarate:ferredoxin oxidoreductase.

== In nature ==
Thiomicrospira denitrificans, "Candidatus Arcobacter", and Chlorobaculum tepidum have been shown to utilize the rTCA cycle to turn CO_{2} into carbon compounds. The ability of these bacteria, among others, to use the rTCA cycle, supports the idea that they are derived from an ancestral proteobacterium, and that other organisms using this cycle are much more abundant than previously believed.

The rTCA of the chemolithotrophic Thermosulfidibacter takaii takes place via an "unexpected" reversal of citrate synthase. A kinetic network model has been built for this type of TCA. It contains the following enzymes:

- rTCA proper:
  1. Citrate synthase (EC 2.3.3.1)
  2. Aconitate (EC 4.2.1.3)
  3. Isocitrate dehydrogenase (EC 1.1.1.42)
  4. 2-oxoglutarate:ferredoxin oxidoreductase (EC 1.2.7.3)
    Oxidative counterpart: 2-oxoglutarate dehydrogenase (EC 1.2.1.ak formerly 1.2.4.2)
  5. Succinate dehydrogenase (EC 1.3.5.1)
  6. Fumarate hydratase (EC 4.2.1.2)
  7. Malate dehydrogenase (EC 1.1.1.37)
  8. Pyruvate:ferredoxin oxidoreductase (EC 1.2.7.1)
    Oxidative counterpart: pyruvate dehydrogenase (EC 1.2.1.aj)
- Associated reactions, including anaplerotic:
  1. NADP-malic enzyme (EC 1.1.1.40)
  2. Phosphoenolpyruvate synthase (EC 2.7.9.2)
  3. Phosphoenolpyruvate carboxykinase (EC 4.1.1.49)
  4. Pyruvate kinase (EC 2.7.1.40)
  5. Pyruvate carboxylase (EC 6.4.1.1)
- Other reactions
  1. Ferredoxin—NAD reductase (EC 1.18.1.3)
  2. Ferredoxin—NADP reductase (EC 1.18.1.7)
  3. Adenylate kinase (EC 2.7.4.3)

As with the standard Krebs cycle, there is a branching point between citrate and oxaloacetate going through acetyl-CoA and pyruvate, only reversed. The NADP-malic enzyme creates a second path from malate to pyruvate.

=== Variants ===
Upon an influx of succinate, the rTCA model bifurcates into a partial reversal: it would perform succinate → fumarate → malate in the oxidative direction and the rest in the reductive direction (also ending in malate). This cycle runs at full speed and would reflect a chemolithomixotrophic lifestyle.

A large input of acetyl-CoA would impair the rTCA by forcing the consumption of oxaloacetate to form citrate, causing bottlenecks of reduced flux. A smaller input would not cause the citrate synthase to run in the oxidative direction, but still hinders its action and reduces the flux. Overall this shows that a full rTCA cannot co-exist with a fully functional Wood–Ljungdahl (WL) pathway. As predicted, the following variants have been seen in deep-branching bacteria and archaea:

- Incomplete rTCA, full WL (bacteria and archaea)
- Incomplete rTCA, full reverse glycolysis (rGly) (bacteria)
- Complete rTCA, incomplete WL or rGly (bacteria and archaea)
- Impaired but complete rTCA, full dicarboxylate/4-hydroxybutyrate pathway (DC/4HB) or a 3-hydroxypropionate/4-hydroxybutyrate pathway (3HP/4HB) (archaea).
- Full oxidiative TCA (oTCA) with incomplete DC/4HB (archaea).
- Full oTCA with Calvin cycle and incomplete rGly (bacteria).
- Incomplete oTCA with complete WL (bacteria).

== Relevance to early life ==
The reverse Krebs cycle is believed to be used by the first forms of life due to it matching a chemoautotrophic lifestyle. It is one of the most ancient carbon fixation pathways along with the Wood–Ljungdahl pathway (WL). It would have provided the building blocks for the earliest biomolecules. Its possible presence in the first forms of life and compatibility with prebiotic early-Earth conditions makes it of interest in the research of the origin of life. The question is thus split into three parts:

1. How would an abiotic (mineral) environment catalyze (at least some) steps of the cycle to form the earliest biomolecules?
2. How would early biomolecules catalyze (at least some) steps of the cycle to propagate themselves?
3. How would the last universal common ancestor perform (at least some) steps of the cycle using catalysts more similar to the enzymes of today?

=== Abiotic catalysis ===
It has been found that some non-consecutive steps of the cycle can be catalyzed by minerals through photochemistry, while entire two and three-step sequences can be promoted by metal ions such as iron (as reducing agents) under acidic conditions. However, the conditions are extremely harsh and require 1 M hydrochloric or 1 M sulfuric acid and strong heating at 80–140 °C.

The complete rTCA is untenable without the use of enzymes due to kinetic and thermodynamic limitations. However, it is suggested that a nonenzymatic precursor to the Krebs cycle, glyoxylate cycle, and reverse Krebs cycle might have originated, where oxidation and reduction reactions cooperated. The later use of carboxylation utilizing ATP could have given rise to parts of reverse Krebs cycle.

Many reactions of the reverse Krebs cycle, including thioesterification and hydrolysis, could have been catalyzed by iron-sulfide minerals at deep sea alkaline hydrothermal vent cavities. More recently, aqueous microdroplets have been shown to promote reductive carboxylation reactions in the reverse Krebs cycle.

=== Enzyme stage ===
The kinetic and thermodynamic parameters of the reduction of highly oxidized species to push the rTCA cycle are seemingly unlikely without the necessary action of biological catalysts known as enzymes. The rate of some of the reactions in the rTCA cycle likely would have been too slow to contribute significantly to the formation of life on Earth without enzymes. Considering the thermodynamics of the rTCA cycle, the increase in Gibbs free energy going from product to reactant would make pyrophosphate an unlikely energy source for the conversion of pyruvate to oxaloacetate as the reaction is too endoergic.

Some authors believe that even in the last universal common ancestor, not all reactions of the rTCA had been moved to aenzymes, and some use of mineral catalysis remains.

== Medical relevance ==
The reverse Krebs cycle is proposed to be a major role in the pathophysiology of melanoma. Melanoma tumors are known to alter normal metabolic pathways in order to utilize waste products. These metabolic adaptations help the tumor adapt to its metabolic needs. The most well known adaptation is the Warburg effect where tumors increase their uptake and utilization of glucose. Glutamine is one of the known substances to be utilized in the reverse Krebs cycle in order to produce acetyl-CoA. This type of mitochondrial activity could provide a new way to identify and target cancer causing cells.

== See also ==
- Carbon fixation
- Calvin cycle
