= Thermocrinis albus =

Scientific classification
- Domain: Bacteria
- Kingdom: Pseudomonadati
- Phylum: Aquificota
- Class: Aquificia
- Order: Aquificales
- Family: Aquificaceae
- Genus: Thermocrinis
- Species: T. albus

Binomial name
- Thermocrinis albus Eder & Huber, 2002

Species of bacterium

Thermocrinis albus is a bacterium. Its type strain is HI 11/12 (DSM 14484, JCM 11386).
