= Karl Stetter =

German microbiologist

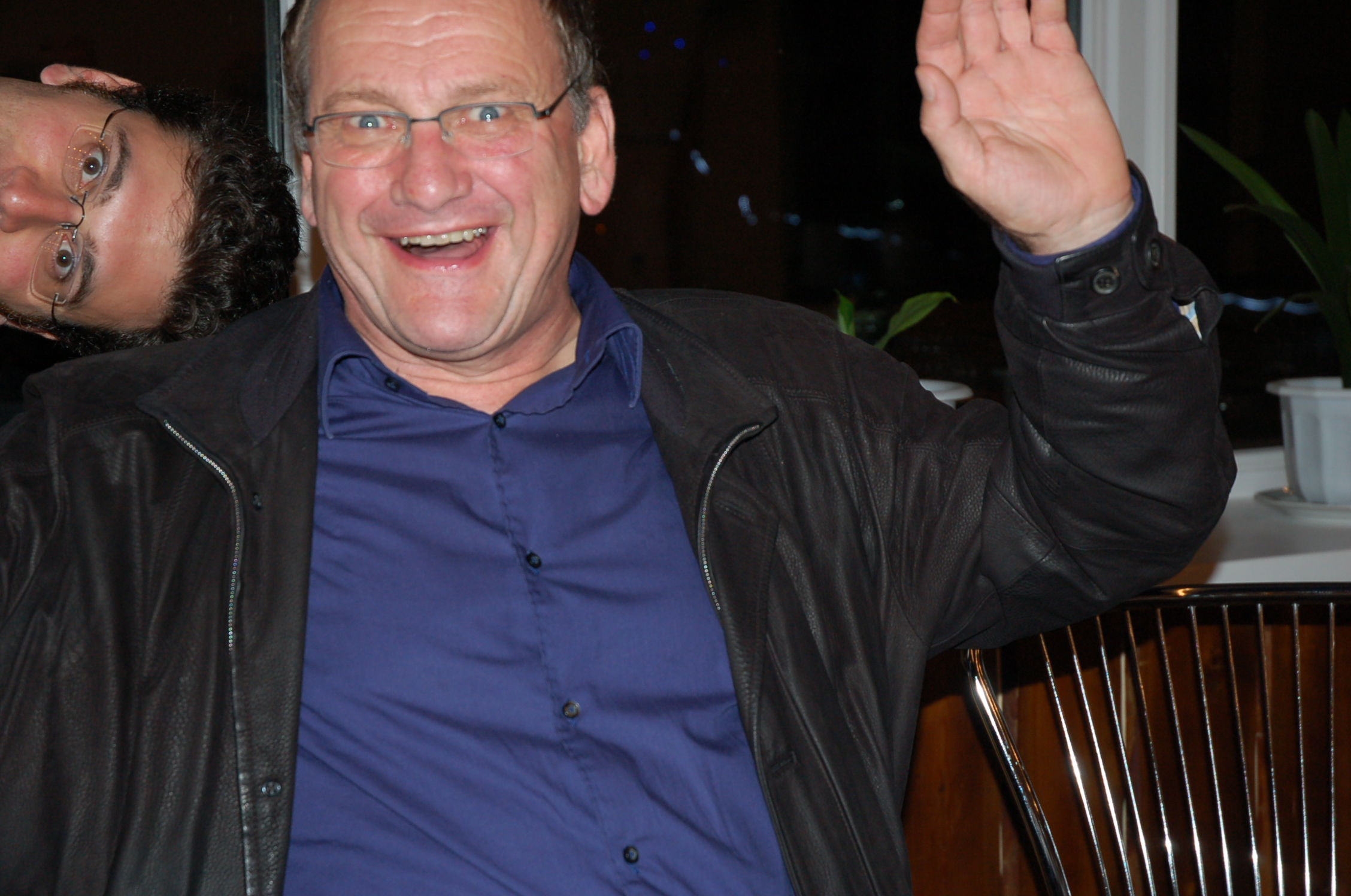
- Stetter in 2010
- Born: Karl Otto Stetter; 16 July 1941 (age 85); Munich, Germany
- Education: Technical University of Munich
- Known for: Discovering new archaea
- Awards: Leeuwenhoek Medal

Karl Otto Stetter (born 16 July 1941) is a German microbiologist and authority on astrobiology. Stetter is an expert on microbial life at high temperatures.

== Career ==
Stetter was born in Munich and studied biology at the Technical University of Munich. He wrote his doctoral dissertation on lactobacilli. From 1980 to 2002 Stetter was professor at, and head of, the department of microbiology and of the Archaea center of the University of Regensburg.

The majority of Stetter's research has focused on sampling, isolating and characterizing archaeal organisms which comprise the third domain of life, particularly undiscovered extremely heat-loving (hyperthermophilic) bacteria and Archaea, also called extremophiles, growing optimally between 80 and 113 °C.

== Major discovery ==
In 1992, Stetter, along with Robert Huber, discovered a new species of thermophilic bacteria near Kolbeinsey Ridge and named the species Aquifex pyrophilous.

Nanoarchaeum equitans, an archaeal microorganism containing the world's then smallest known genome, was discovered by Stetter in 2002 in a hydrothermal vent off the coast of Iceland. This archaeon was described in the scientific journal Nature in May 2002.

== Discoveries ==
Among the other extremophiles discovered by Stetter has been Pyrococcus furiosus, which was found on the Italian island of Vulcano in 1981. This extremophile was the source of Pfu DNA polymerase. Stetter also discovered Aquifex aeolicus and Aquifex pyrophilus.

== Awards and memberships ==
In 2003, Stetter was honored with the Leeuwenhoek Medal by the Royal Netherlands Academy of Arts and Sciences, an award given every 10 years to the scientist who has made the most outstanding contributions to the advancement of microbiology.

Stetter is a member of the:

- Deutsche Akademie der Naturforscher Leopoldina
- American Society of Microbiology (ASM)
- Bayerische Akademie der Wissenschaften
- Department of Microbiology and Molecular Genetics and Institute of Geophysics and Planetary Science (IGPP), UCLA
- Deutsche Gesellschaft für Hygiene und Mikrobiologie (DGHM)
- Gesellschaft Deutscher Chemiker (GDCh)
- Gesellschaft Deutscher Naturforscher und Ärzte
- Gesellschaft für Biologische Chemie (GBCh)
- International Committee on Environmental Biogeochemistry (ISEB)
- International Committee on Systematic Bacteriology (ICSB)
- International Institute of Biotechnology
- International Society for the Study of the Origin of Life (ISSOL)
- Royal Netherlands Academy of Arts and Sciences (1999)
- Vereinigung für Allgemeine und Angewandte Mikrobiologie (VAAM)

== See also ==
- Carl Woese
- Hyperthermophiles
- Archaea
