= Aquifex =

Scientific classification
- Domain: Bacteria
- Kingdom: Pseudomonadati
- Phylum: Aquificota
- Order: Aquificales
- Family: Aquificaceae
- Genus: Aquifex; Huber & Stetter 1992

Type species
- Aquifex pyrophilus Huber & Stetter 1992

Species
- "A. aeolicus"; A. pyrophilus

Genus of bacteria

Aquifex is a bacterial genus, belonging to phylum Aquificota. There is one species of Aquifex with a validly published name – A. pyrophilus – but "A. aeolicus" is sometimes considered as species though it has no standing as a name given it has not been validly or effectively published. Aquifex spp. are extreme thermophiles, growing best at temperature of 85 °C to 95 °C. They are members of the Bacteria as opposed to the other inhabitants of extreme environments, the Archaea.

Aquifex spp. are rod-shaped bacteria with a length of 2 to 6 μm, have a diameter of around 0.5 μm and are motile. They are non-sporeforming, Gram negative autotrophs. Aquifex means water-maker in Latin, and refers to the fact that its method of respiration creates water. Aquifex tend to form cell aggregates composed of up to 100 individual cells.

Aquifex spp. are thermophilic and often grow near underwater volcanoes or hot springs. A. aeolicus requires oxygen to survive, but can grow in levels of oxygen as low as 7.5 ppm. A. pyrophilus can even grow anaerobically by reducing nitrogen instead of oxygen. Like other thermophilic bacteria, Aquifex has important uses in industrial processes.

The genome of "A. aeolicus" has been completed.^{,} This was made easier by the fact that the length of the genome is only about a third of the length of the genome for E. coli. Comparison of the A. aeolicus genome to other organisms showed that around 16% of its genes originated from the Archaea domain. Members of this genus are thought to be some of the earliest members of the eubacteria domain.

"A. aeolicus" was discovered north of Sicily, while A. pyrophilus was first found just north of Iceland.

== Genome structure ==
The complete genome for A. aeolicus consists of 1,551,335 base pairs with over 1500 open reading frames (ORFs) or chromosomal coding sequences. An extremely large portion (over 90%) of the genome are protein-coding regions and there are no significant non-coding repeats. Though the A. aeolicus genome is dense, many enzyme subunits used for respiration processes are found in separate operons. Any repairs to the genome are done by a protein like DNA polymerase beta found in most eukaryotes.

== Cell metabolism ==
Aquifex respiration and fixation pathways use similar pathways to that of other autotrophic bacteria. Carbon fixation is done using the reductive TCA cycle and forms acetyl-CoA as well as many other bio-synthetic materials. Many bacteria use products from the TCA cycle in the pentose-phosphate pathway and Entner-Doudoroff pathway or Embden-Meyerhof-Parnas pathway; however, many enzymes that are necessary for these gluconeogenic processes have not been identified in A. aeolicus, suggesting a different pathway might be used.

A. aeolicus needs oxygen at concentrations higher than 7.5 ppm to perform respiration while A. pyrophilus is capable of respiration with nitrogen. However, both species have a nitrate reductase and nitrate transporter genes located within their genome. The enzymes used in other bacteria for oxygen respiration are used by Aquifex. Many other oxidoreductases are present; however, their physiological role is unknown. Aquifex oxides thiosulfate, molecular hydrogen, and sulfur within their respiratory pathway.

== Phylogeny ==
Phylogenetic trees that are based on small subunit rRNA suggest that Aquificales are some of the earliest bacteria that branched from Archaea. However, phylogenetic trees based on protein contradict this argument. The exact phylogeny is hard to determine because of this and the many horizontal gene transfers within the lineage. These factors lead many to believe the phylum of Aquifex is basal next to Thermotogota, another hyperthermophilic phylum, or are a part of the Campylobacterota, a highly diverse group of hydrothermal dwelling species.

== Research potential ==
A. aeolicus is used as a model organism for hyperthermophilic bacterium. Many studies have looked at the Aquifex hydrogenases ability to perform the reversible oxidation of dihydrogen (the oxidation reaction) at extremely high temperatures. The success of the properties within the hydrogenases of Aquifex mark the genus as a possible renewable bio-catalysts for hydrogen based fuel cells.

== See also ==
- List of bacterial orders
- List of bacteria genera
