= Great Boiling Spring =

Hot spring near Gerlach, Nevada

Great Boiling Spring/Gerlach Hot Springs
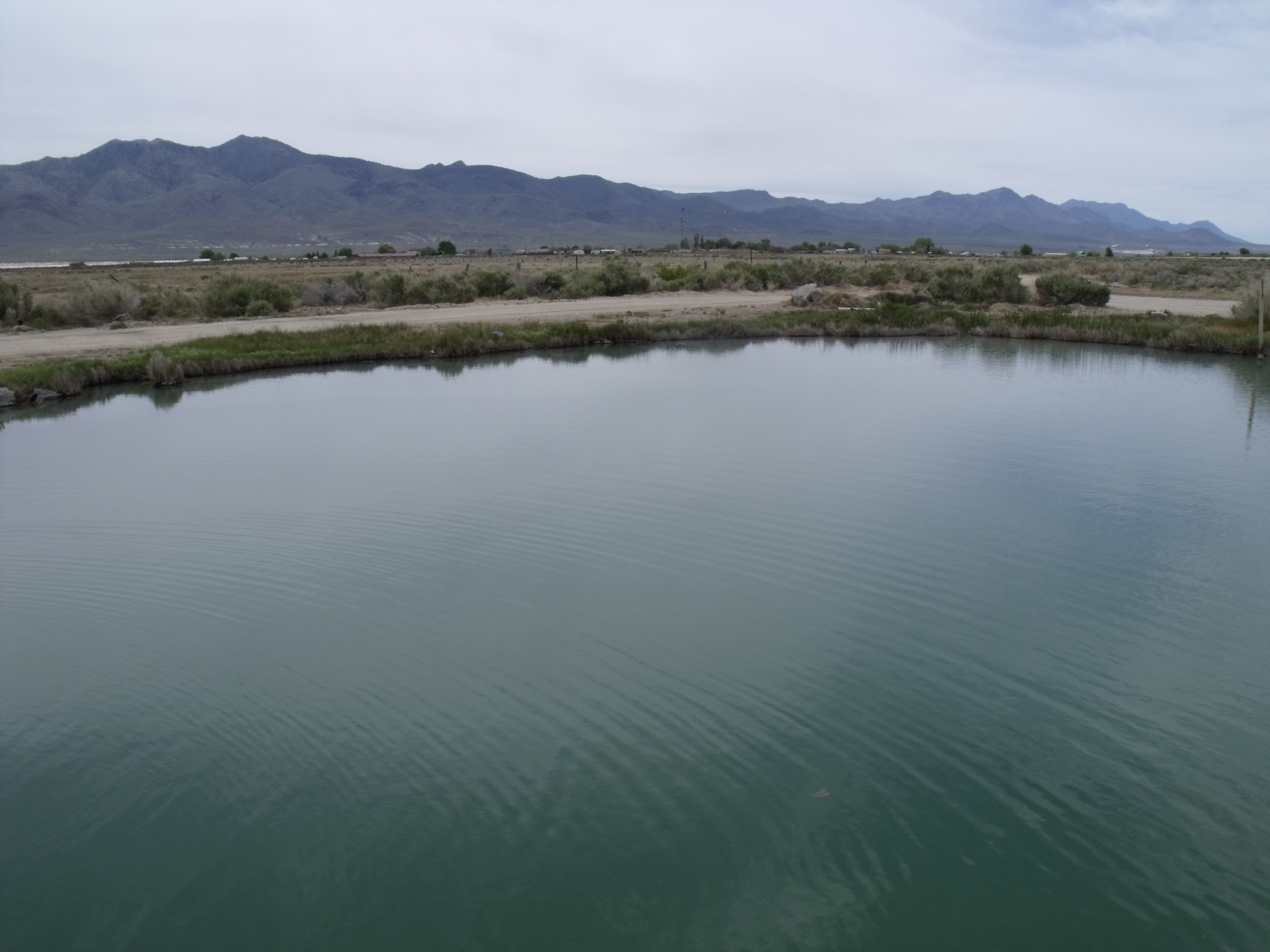
- Gerlach Hot Springs, 2009

- Location within Nevada Location within the United States
- Name origin: John C. Frémont, 1844
- Location: Gerlach, Nevada
- Coordinates: 40°39′42″N 119°21′56″W
- Type: hot spring
- Temperature: 208 °F (98 °C)
- Depth: >400 feet (120 m)

Great Boiling Spring, also known as Gerlach Hot Springs, is a hot spring on private land near Gerlach, Nevada.

Great Boiling Spring Park is a historical name for a former park that was on private property. The spring is not currently accessible by the public and has not been so since the 1990s. The spring is fenced off to keep swimmers out. In the 1960s and 1970s, the park was a popular weekend destination.

== History ==
John C. Frémont's 1844 visit was the first recorded description of what he called Great Boiling Spring. Frémont described the springs as

The basin of the largest one has a circumference of several hundred feet; but there is at one extremity a circular space of about fifteen feet in diameter, entirely occupied by the boiling water. It boils up at irregular intervals, and with much noise. The water is clear, and the spring deep; a pole about sixteen feet long was easily immersed in the centre, but we but no means of forming a good idea of the depth. It was surrounded on the margin with a border of green grass, and near the shore the temperature of the water was 206°. We had no means, of ascertaining that of the centre, where the heat was greatest ; but, by dispersing the water with a pole, the temperature at the margin was increased to 208°, and in the centre it was doubtless higher. By driving the pole towards the bottom, the water was made to boil up with increased force and noise. There are several other interesting places, where water and smoke or gas escape, but they would require a long description. The water is impregnated with common salt, but not so much so as to render it unfit for general cooking; and a mixture of snow made it pleasant to drink.

— John C. Frémont

In 1909, when the Western Pacific Railroad station at Gerlach was constructed, the springs located just west of town were commonly referred to as Gerlach Hot Springs.
