= TRNA (guanine26-N2)-dimethyltransferase =

Enzyme

TRNA (guanine^{26}-N^{2})-dimethyltransferase

Identifiers
- EC no.: 2.1.1.216

Databases
- BRENDA: enzyme data
- ExPASy: NiceZyme view
- KEGG: enzyme entry
- MetaCyc: metabolic pathway
- Rhea: reactions
- PDB structures: RCSB PDB PDBe PDBsum
Search
- PMC: articles
- PubMed: articles
- NCBI: proteins

TRNA (guanine^{26}-N^{2})-dimethyltransferase (EC 2.1.1.216, Trm1p, TRM1, tRNA (m22G26)dimethyltransferase) is an enzyme with systematic name S-adenosyl-L-methionine:tRNA (guanine^{26}-N^{2})-dimethyltransferase. This enzyme catalyses the following chemical reaction

2 S-adenosyl-L-methionine + guanine^{26} in tRNA $\rightleftharpoons$ 2 S-adenosyl-L-homocysteine + N^{2}-dimethylguanine26 in tRNA

The enzyme dissociates from its tRNA substrate between the two consecutive methylation reactions.
