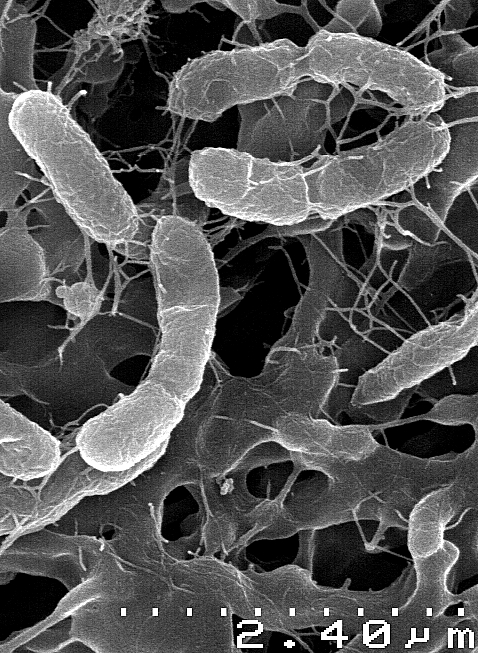
- Venenivibrio

Scientific classification
- Domain: Bacteria
- Kingdom: Pseudomonadati
- Phylum: Aquificota
- Class: Aquificia
- Order: Aquificales
- Family: Hydrogenothermaceae; Eder & Huber 2003

Genera
- Hydrogenothermus; Persephonella; Sulfurihydrogenibium; Venenivibrio

= Hydrogenothermaceae =

Family of bacteria

The Hydrogenothermaceae family are bacteria that live in harsh environmental settings. They have been found in hot springs, sulfur pools, and thermal ocean vents. They are true bacteria as opposed to the other inhabitants of extreme environments, the Archaea. An example occurrence of certain extremophiles in this family are organisms of the genus Sulfurihydrogenibium that are capable of surviving in extremely hot environments such as Hverigerdi, Iceland.

== Obtaining energy ==
Hydrogenothermaceae families consist of aerobic or microaerophilic bacteria, which generally obtain energy by oxidation of hydrogen or reduced sulfur compounds by molecular oxygen.

== Phylogeny ==
The currently accepted taxonomy is based on the List of Prokaryotic names with Standing in Nomenclature (LPSN) and National Center for Biotechnology Information (NCBI).

16S rRNA based LTP_10_2024

- - Persephonella hydrogeniphila Nakagawa et al. 2003
  - - Persephonella marina Götz et al. 2002 (type sp.)
    - - Persephonella guaymasensis Götz et al. 2002
      - - Hydrogenothermus marinus Stöhr et al. 2001
        - - Venenivibrio stagnispumantis Hetzer et al. 2008
          - - Sulfurihydrogenibium
              - S. yellowstonense Nakagawa et al. 2005
              - - S. azorense Aguiar et al. 2004
                - - S. subterraneum Takai et al. 2003
                  - - S. kristjanssonii Flores et al. 2008
                    - S. rodmanii O'Neill et al. 2008

120 marker proteins based GTDB 10-RS226

- - - Venenivibrio stagnispumantis
    - - Sulfurihydrogenibium
        - S. yellowstonense
        - - S. subterraneum
          - S. azorense
  - - Hydrogenothermus marinus
    - - Persephonella
        - P. marina
        - - P. atlantica Francois et al. 2025
          - P. hydrogeniphila

== See also ==
- List of bacterial orders
- List of bacteria genera
