= Aquificaceae =

Scientific classification
- Domain: Bacteria
- Kingdom: Pseudomonadati
- Phylum: Aquificota
- Class: Aquificia
- Order: Aquificales
- Family: Aquificaceae; Reysenbach 2002

Genera
- Aquifex; Hydrogenivirga; Hydrogenobacter; Hydrogenobaculum; "Pampinifervens"; Thermocrinis

Family of bacteria

The Aquificaceae family are bacteria that live in harsh environmental settings such as hot springs, sulfur pools, and hydrothermal vents. Although they are true bacteria as opposed to the other inhabitants of extreme environments, the Archaea, Aquificaceae genera are an early phylogenetic branch.

== Phylogeny ==
The currently accepted taxonomy is based on the List of Prokaryotic names with Standing in Nomenclature (LPSN) and National Center for Biotechnology Information (NCBI).

16S rRNA based LTP_10_2024

- Aquificaceae
  - Hydrogenobaculum acidophilum (Shima & Suzuki 1993) Stohr et al. 2001
  - - - Aquifex pyrophilus Huber and Stetter 1992 (type sp.)
      - - Hydrogenivirga
          - H. calditorris Nakagawa et al. 2004 (type sp.)
          - H. okinawensis Nunoura et al. 2008
    - - - Thermocrinis
          - T. albus Eder and Huber 2002
          - - T. jamiesonii Dodsworth et al. 2015
            - T. ruber Huber et al. 1999 (type sp.)
      - - Thermocrinis minervae Huber et al. 1999
        - - - Hydrogenobacter subterraneus Takai et al. 2001
            - Thermothrix azorensis Odintsova et al. 1996
          - - Hydrogenobacter
              - H. hydrogenophilus (Kryukov et al. 1984) Stöhr et al. 2001
              - H. thermophilus Kawasumi et al. 1984 (type sp.)

120 marker proteins based GTDB 10-RS226

- Aquificaceae
  - Hydrogenobaculum acidophilum
  - - - Aquifex pyrophilus
      - Hydrogenivirga calditorris
    - - Thermocrinis minervae
      - - Hydrogenobacter
          - H. hydrogenophilus
          - H. thermophilus
        - Thermocrinis
          - T. albus
          - - T. jamiesonii
            - T. ruber

Unassigned species:

- "Aquifex aeolicus" Huber and Stetter 2001

== See also ==
- List of bacterial orders
- List of bacteria genera
