= Aquifex pyrophilus =

Scientific classification
- Domain: Bacteria
- Kingdom: Pseudomonadati
- Phylum: Aquificota
- Class: Aquificia
- Order: Aquificales
- Family: Aquificaceae
- Genus: Aquifex
- Species: A. pyrophilus

Binomial name
- Aquifex pyrophilus Huber and Stetter, 1992

Species of bacterium

Aquifex pyrophilus is a gram-negative, non-spore forming, rod-shaped bacteria. It is one of a handful of species in the Aquificota phylum, which are a group of thermophilic bacteria that are found near underwater volcanoes or hot springs.

== Etymology ==
Aquifex pyrophilus has a name that references its respiration and its habitat. The name "Aquifex" means "water-maker" in Latin. The name was assigned to A. pyrophilus because it typically uses oxygen as its respiration and water as a byproduct. The name "Pyrophilus" can be broken down into "Pyro" and "Philus". "Pyro" (pyr, to pyrós) is Greek for fire, heat, or high temperature and "Philus" (ho philós) is a Greek word for "friend". Therefore the term "pyrophilus" can be interpreted as "friend of fire or heat loving" which refers to the habitat A. pyrophilus is typically found in.

== Habitat ==
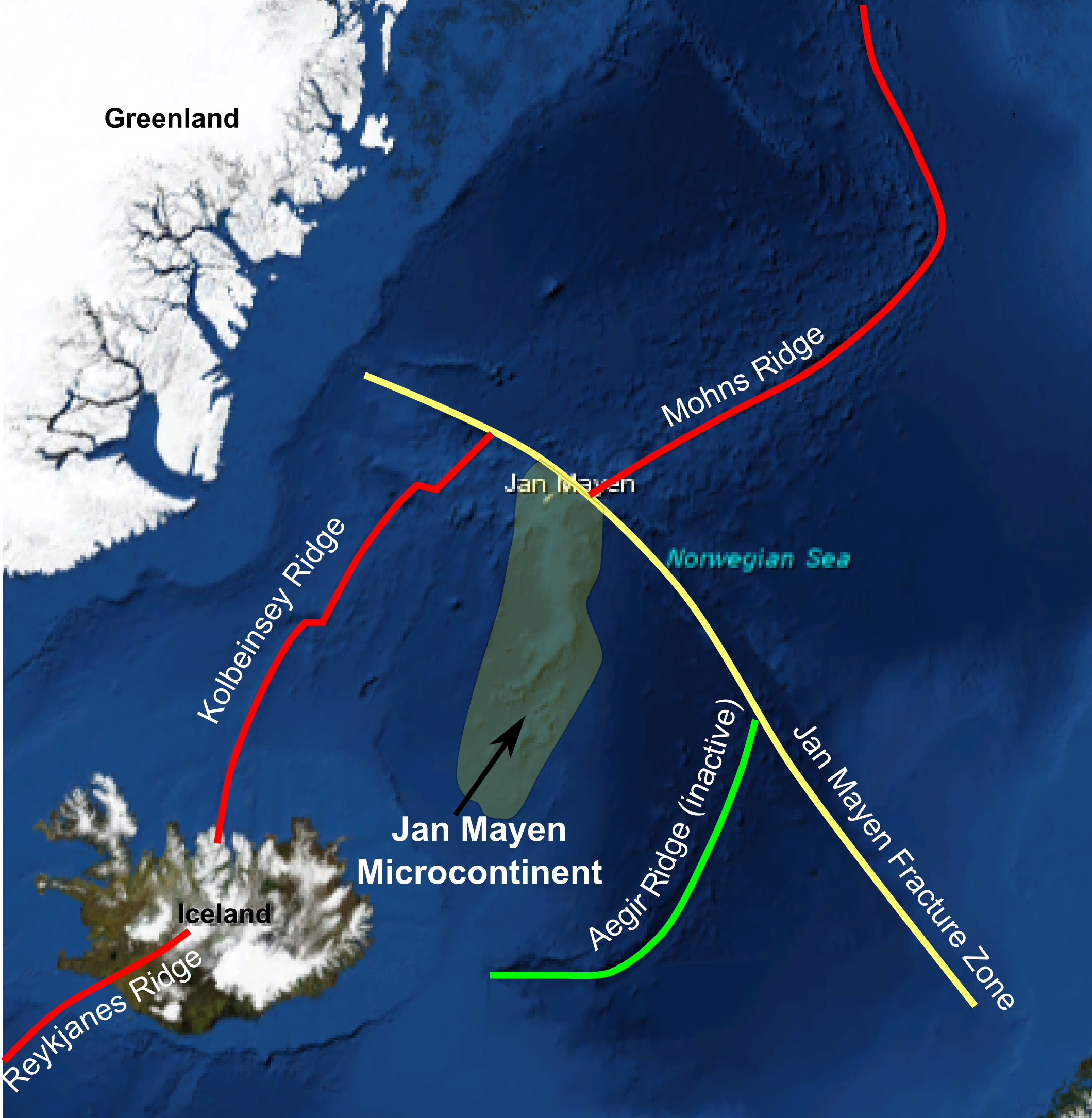
Kolbeinsey Ridge lies between Greenland, Iceland, and the Jan Mayen Microcontinent. This is the location where Aquifex pyrophilus was discovered. It is a submarine ridge that has high volcanic activity.

The genus Aquifex is a contains some of the most thermophilic bacterium of all known bacteria. A. pyrophilus is an aquatic microbe that is typically found near underwater volcanoes, marine hydrothermal vents, and/or hot springs where temperatures are extremely high and pressure can be immense. A. pyrophilus has shown resistance to ultraviolet light and ionizing radiation. The Aquifex genus is rather intolerable to oxygen therefore it is only found in low-oxygenated environments. Despite this, Aquifex remains one of only aerobic bacterial hyperthermophiles known.. It was also detected within microbial mats on calcareous stromatolites in highly alkaline (pH = 9.7) Lake Van at normal temperatures. Oxygen is limited near these hydrothermal vents and underwater volcanos because of the extremely high temperature and reducing power of volcanic gases like H_{2}S. A. pyrophilus thrives where the oxic and anoxic zones meet in these environments because of the high availability of hydrogen and thiosulfate. Aquifex pyrophilus was discovered at Kolbeinsey Ridge, North of Iceland by Robert Huber and Karl Stetter in 1992. In Huber's and Stetter's first analysis of the bacteria, they found that A. pyrophilus had an optimum pH of 6.8 but ranged anywhere between 5.4 and 7.5, grew at temperatures ranging from 67 °C to 95 °C with an optimum at 85 °C, and had optimal growth with a NaCl concentration of 3% (range of 1-5%).A. pyrophilus is 2 to 6 micrometers long and has a diameter of around half a micrometer. It has eight polytrichously inserted flagella making it motile. A. pyrophilus can grow singly, in pairs, and/or form large cell conglomerations, comprising up to 100 individual cells.

== Metabolism ==
The Aquifex electron transport chain when growing in an aerobic environment.

A. pyrophilus is strictly chemolithoautotrophic. It is capable of using oxygen in its respiration, but can also grow anaerobically by nitrate reduction. In aerobic conditions, A. pyrophilus oxidizes molecular hydrogen and yields H_{2}O and ATP. Other electron donors that A. pyrophilus uses in aerobic conditions are S° and S_{2}O_{3}^{2-}. Byproducts include sulfuric acid from S° and S_{2}O_{3}^{2-} and hydrogen sulfide from S° and H_{2}.

== Lineage and phylogeny ==
A. pyrophilus has a relatively small genome. Out of the known thermophile genomes, A. pyrophilus is the smallest. Due to its small genome, its ability to survive in extreme heat, its ability to be resistant toward ultraviolet light and ionizing radiation, and because of phylogenetic analyses of the small-subunit 16S rRNA gene, A. pyrophilus is thought to be one of the oldest species in the bacteria domain.

Investigations of the phylogenetic position of Aquificales have utilized the concatenated proteins shared within the Aquificales order and A. pyrophilus. The results show that the Aquificales are most closely related to Thermotogales when observing whole-genome information. Additionally, Aquificales were found to be somewhat closely related to ε-proteobacteria in phylogenetic trees. This slight ambiguity in the placement of Aquificales on the phylogenetic tree leaves room for some more research in this field. Despite this, there is overwhelming evidence that Aquificales, including A. pyrophilus, are some of the earliest bacteria to branch from archaea. This has led to hypothesis that these bacteria evolved when the earth was still hot and had a thin atmosphere.
