= Desulfurellaceae =

Scientific classification
- Domain: Bacteria
- Kingdom: Pseudomonadati
- Phylum: Campylobacterota
- Class: Desulfurellia; Waite et al. 2017
- Order: Desulfurellales; Kuever et al. 2006
- Family: Desulfurellaceae; Kuever et al. 2006

Genera
- Desulfurella; Hippea

Family of bacteria

The Desulfurellaceae are a small family of Campylobacterota, given its own order and class. The family was classified under Deltaproteobacteria per established nomenclature in LPSN, but phylogenetic evidence has moved it elsewhere.

== See also ==
- List of bacterial orders
- List of bacteria genera
