= Aquificota =

Scientific classification
- Domain: Bacteria
- Kingdom: Pseudomonadati
- Phylum: Aquificota; Reysenbach 2021

Class
- Aquificia; Desulfurobacteriia; Thermosulfidibacteria

Synonyms
- "Aquificae" Reysenbach 2001; "Aquithermota" Cavalier-Smith 2020; "Aquificota" Whitman et al. 2018; "Aquificaeota" Oren et al. 2015

Phylum of bacteria

The Aquificota phylum is a diverse collection of bacteria that live in harsh environmental settings. The name Aquificota was given to this phylum based on an early genus identified within this group, Aquifex (“water maker”), which is able to produce water by oxidizing hydrogen. They have been found in springs, pools, and oceans. They are autotrophs, and are the primary carbon fixers in their environments. These bacteria are Gram-negative, non-spore-forming rods. They are true bacteria (domain Bacteria) as opposed to the other inhabitants of extreme environments, the Archaea.

== Taxonomy ==
The Aquificota currently contain 15 genera and 42 validly published species. The phylum comprises three class with each of them having their respective order. Aquificales consists of the families Aquificaceae and Hydrogenothermaceae, while the Desulfurobacteriaceae are the only family within the Desulfurobacteriales. Thermosulfidibacter takaii is not assigned to a family within the phylum based on its phylogenetic distinctness from both orders. It is currently classified as a member of Aquificales, but it has shown more physiological similarity to the Desulfobacteriaceae.

== Molecular signatures and phylogenetic position ==
Comparative genomic studies have identified several conserved signature indels (CSIs) that are specific for all species belonging to the phylum Aquificota and provide potential molecular markers. The order Aquificales can be distinguished from Desulfobacteriales by several CSIs across different proteins that are specific for each group. Additional CSIs have been found at the family level, and can be used to demarcate Aquificota and Hydrogenothermaceae from all other bacteria. In parallel with the observed CSI distribution, the orders within the Aquificota are also physiologically distinct from one another. Members of the Desulfurobacteriales are strict anaerobes that exclusively oxidize hydrogen for energy, whereas those belonging to the Aquificales are microaerophilic, and capable of oxidizing other compounds (such as sulfur or thiosulfate) in addition to hydrogen.

Several CSIs have also been identified that are specific for the species from the Aquificota and provide potential molecular markers for this phylum. Additionally, a 51-amino-acid insertion has been identified in SecA preprotein translocase which is shared by all members of the Aquificota, as well as all members of the order Thermotogales. Phylogenetic studies demonstrated that the presence of the same CSI within these two unrelated groups of bacteria is not due to lateral gene transfer, rather the CSI likely developed independently in these two groups of thermophiles due to selective pressure. The 51 amino acid insertion is located on the surface of SecA near the binding site of ADP/ATP. Molecular dynamic simulations revealed a network water molecules forming an intermediate interaction between residues of the 51 aa CSI and ADP molecules, which serves to stabilize the hydrogen bonds formed between ADP/ATP and the protein. It is suggested that the network of hydrogen bonds formed between the water molecules, CSI residues and ADP/ATP helps to maintain ATP/ADP binding to the SecA protein at high temperatures, which contributes to the bacteria’s overall thermostability.

In the 16S rRNA gene trees, the Aquificota species branch in the proximity of the phylum Thermotogota (another phylum comprising hyperthermophilic organisms) close to the archaeal-bacterial branch point. However, a close relationship of the Aquificota to the Thermotogota and the deep branching of the Aquificota is not supported by some phylogenetic studies based upon other gene/protein sequences and also by CSIs in several highly conserved universal proteins 16S-23S-5S operons. In contrast to the very high G+C content of their rRNAs (i.e. more than 62%), which is required for stability of their secondary structures at high growth temperatures, the inference that the Aquificota do not constitute a deep-branch lineage is also independently strongly supported by CSIs in a number of important proteins (viz. Hsp70, Hsp60, RpoB, RpoB and AlaRS), which support its placement in the proximity of the phylum Proteobacteria, particularly the Campylobacterota. A specific relationship of the Aquificota to the Proteobacteria is supported by a two-amino-acid CSI in the protein inorganic pyrophosphatase, which is uniquely found in species from these two phyla. Cavalier-Smith has also suggested that the Aquificota are closely related to the Proteobacteria. In contrast to the above cited analyses that are based on a few indels or on single genes, analyses on informational genes, which appeared to be less often transferred to the Aquifex lineage than noninformational genes, most often placed the Aquificales close to the Thermotogales. These authors explain the frequently observed grouping of Aquificota with Campylobacterota as result of frequent horizontal gene transfer due to shared ecological niches.

Along with the Thermotogota, the Aquificota are thermophilic eubacteria.

== Phylogeny ==
The currently accepted taxonomy is based on the List of Prokaryotic names with Standing in Nomenclature (LPSN) and National Center for Biotechnology Information (NCBI).

16S rRNA based LTP_10_2024

- - Thermosulfidibacterales
    Thermosulfidibacteraceae

- Aquificales
  - Desulfurobacteriaceae
  - - Hydrogenothermaceae
    - Aquificaceae [incl. "Hydrogenobaculaceae"]

120 marker proteins based GTDB 10-RS226

- - Thermosulfidibacterota
    - Thermosulfidibacteria
      - Thermosulfidibacterales
        Thermosulfidibacteraceae Chuvochina et al. 2024
  - Aquificota
    - Aquificia
      - Desulfurobacteriales
        Desulfurobacteriaceae L'Haridon et al. 2006
      - Aquificales
        - Hydrogenothermaceae Eder and Huber 2003
        - Aquificaceae Reysenbach 2002

== See also ==
- List of bacterial orders
- List of bacteria genera
