= Solanum catilliflorum =

Scientific classification
- Kingdom: Plantae
- Clade: Tracheophytes
- Clade: Angiosperms
- Clade: Eudicots
- Clade: Asterids
- Order: Solanales
- Family: Solanaceae
- Genus: Solanum
- Species: S. catilliflorum

Binomial name
- Solanum catilliflorum Anderson et al., 2006

Species of plant

Solanum catilliflorum is an evergreen vine in the family Solanaceae. It is endemic to Peru, and is a close relative of Solanum muricatum, the domesticated pepino. It bears small, dish-shaped flowers (thus named catilli-florum: Latin for "dish" and "flower") and is self-compatible and autogamous, with short styles like those that characterize all self-compatible species in this group. It also has a low pollen:ovule ratio, which is characteristic of self-compatible species in the group. It is diploid at n = 12. Together with Solanum perlongistylum, it might be an allopatric variant of S. caripense.
