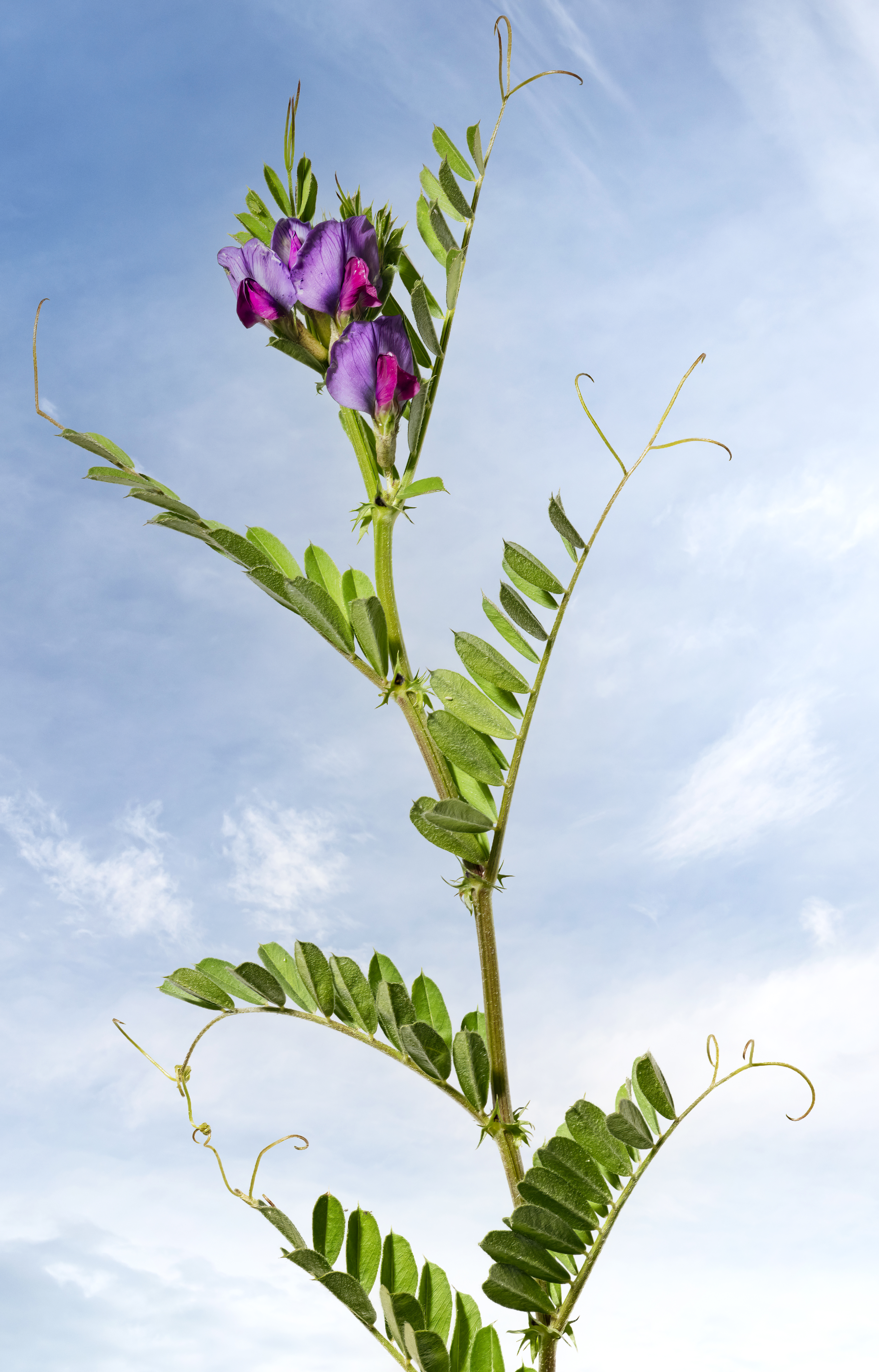

Conservation status
- Least Concern (IUCN 3.1)

Scientific classification
- Kingdom: Plantae
- Clade: Tracheophytes
- Clade: Angiosperms
- Clade: Eudicots
- Clade: Rosids
- Order: Fabales
- Family: Fabaceae
- Subfamily: Faboideae
- Genus: Vicia
- Species: V. sativa

Binomial name
- Vicia sativa L.

Subspecies
- Vicia sativa subsp. amphicarpa (L.) Batt.; Vicia sativa subsp. cordata (Wulfen ex Hoppe) Batt.; Vicia sativa subsp. devia J.G.Costa; Vicia sativa subsp. incisa (M.Bieb.) Arcang.; Vicia sativa subsp. macrocarpa (Moris) Arcang.; Vicia sativa subsp. nigra Ehrh.; Vicia sativa subsp. sativa

Synonyms
- List: Vicia communis proles sativa (L.) Rouy (1899)

= Vicia sativa =

Plant species in the family

Vicia sativa, known as the common vetch, garden vetch, tare or simply vetch, is a nitrogen-fixing leguminous plant in the family Fabaceae. It is now naturalised throughout the world, being absent only in Antarctica and the Arctic regions. The centre of diversity is thought to be the Fertile Crescent, although gold standard molecular confirmation is currently not available.

Global common vetch cultivation is limited due to anti-nutritional compounds in the seed although it is grown in dryland agricultural zones in Australia, China and Ethiopia due to its drought tolerance and very low nutrient requirements compared to other legumes. In these agricultural zones common vetch is grown as a green manure, livestock fodder or rotation crop. In cultivated grainfields, like lentils, it is often considered a weed due to downgrading of harvested mixed grain, resulting in farmers receiving less financial returns.

== Description ==
Vicia sativa is a sprawling annual herb, with hollow, four-sided, hairless to sparsely hairy stems which can reach two meters in maximum length.

The leaves are stipulate, alternate and compound, each made up of 3–8 opposite pairs of linear, lance-shaped, oblong, or wedge-shaped, needle-tipped leaflets up to 35 millimeters (1 1/2 in) long. Each compound leaf ends in a branched tendril.

The pea-like flowers occur in the leaf axils, solitary or in pairs. The flower corolla is 1–3 centimeters (1/2–1 1/4 in) long and bright pink-purple in colour, more rarely whitish or yellow. The flowers are mostly visited by bumblebees.

The fruit is a legume pod up to 6 or 7 centimeters (2 1/4 or 2 3/4 in) long, which is hairy when new, smooth later, then brown or black when ripe. It contains 4–12 seeds.

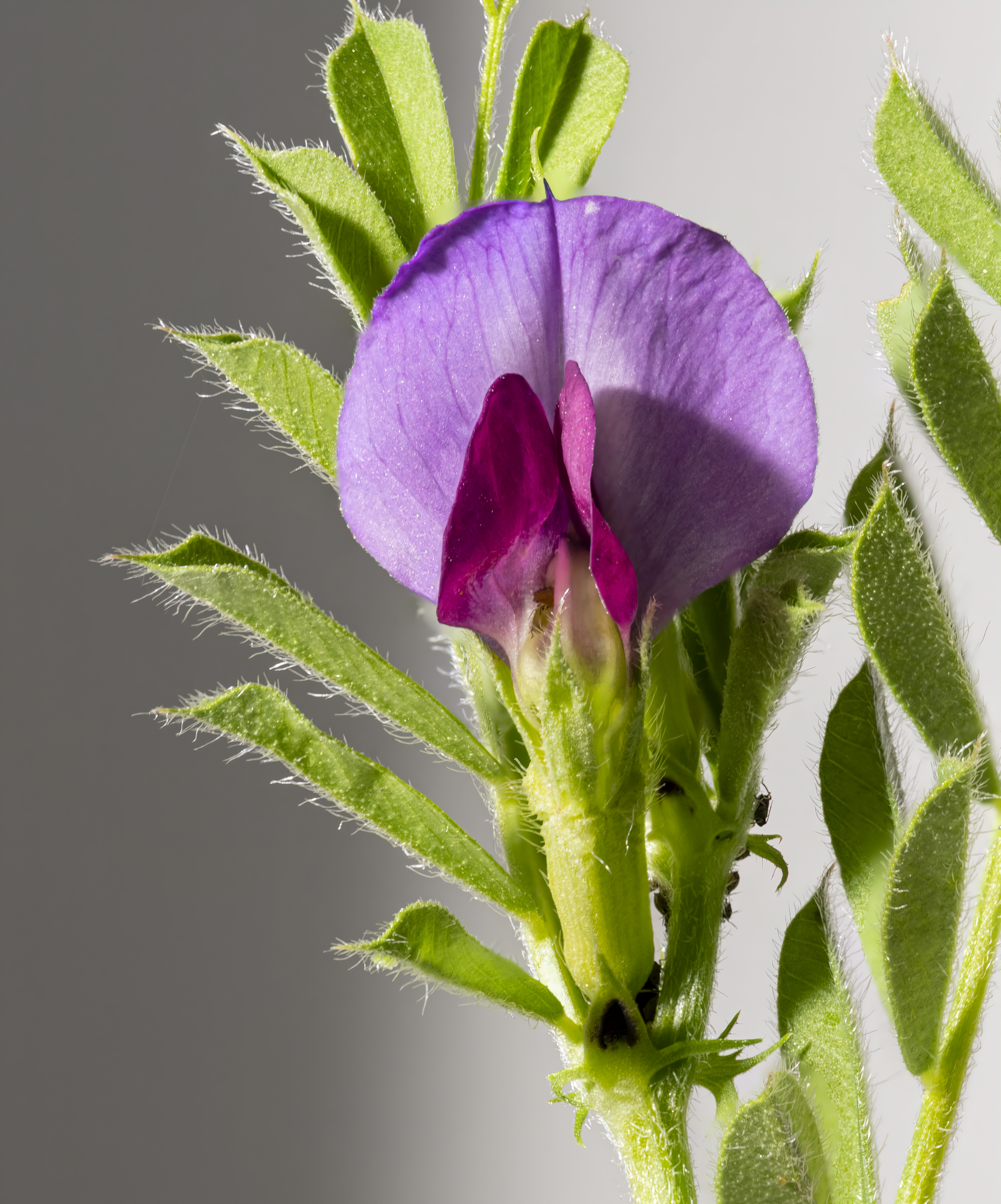
Common flower.

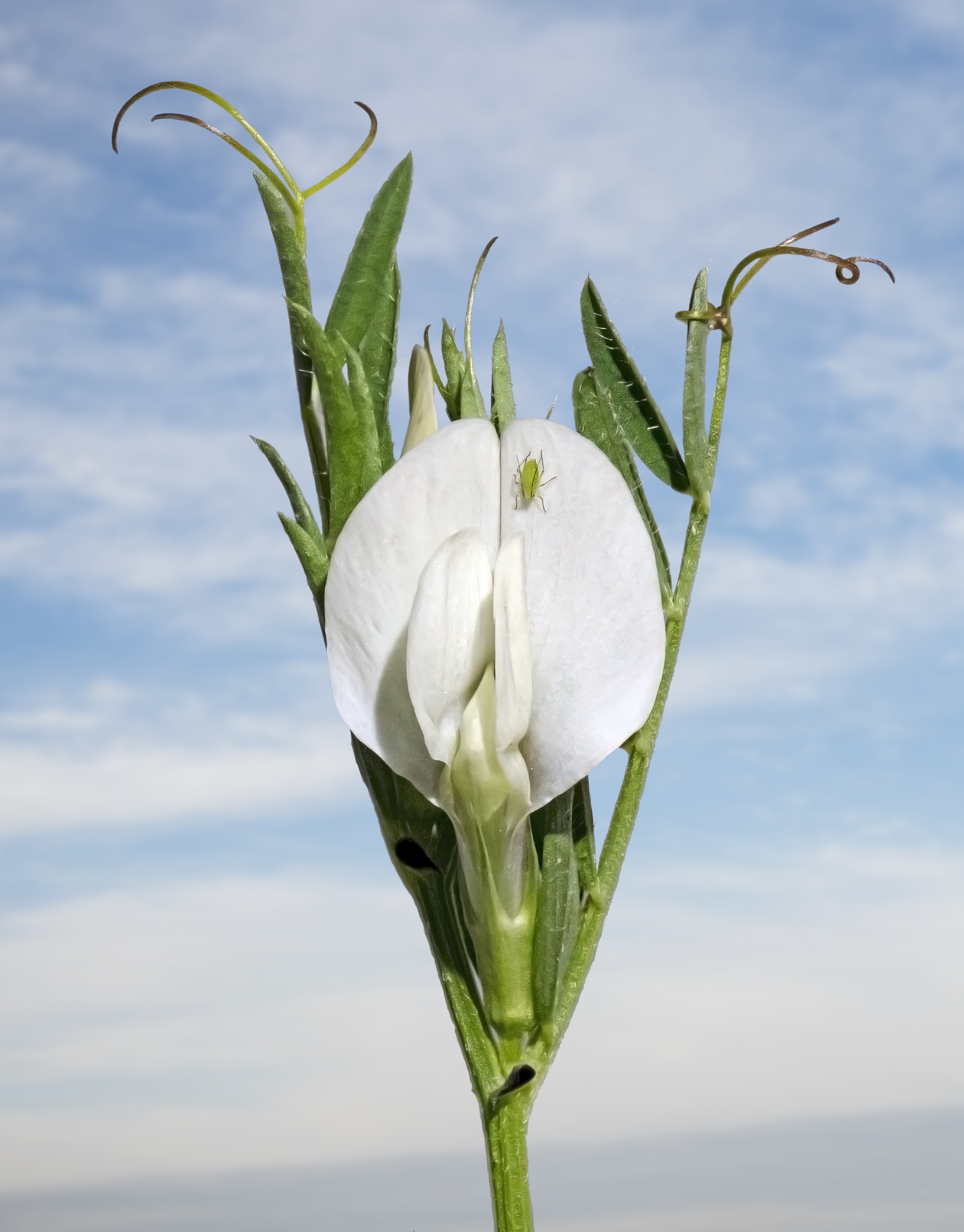
Rarer white flower

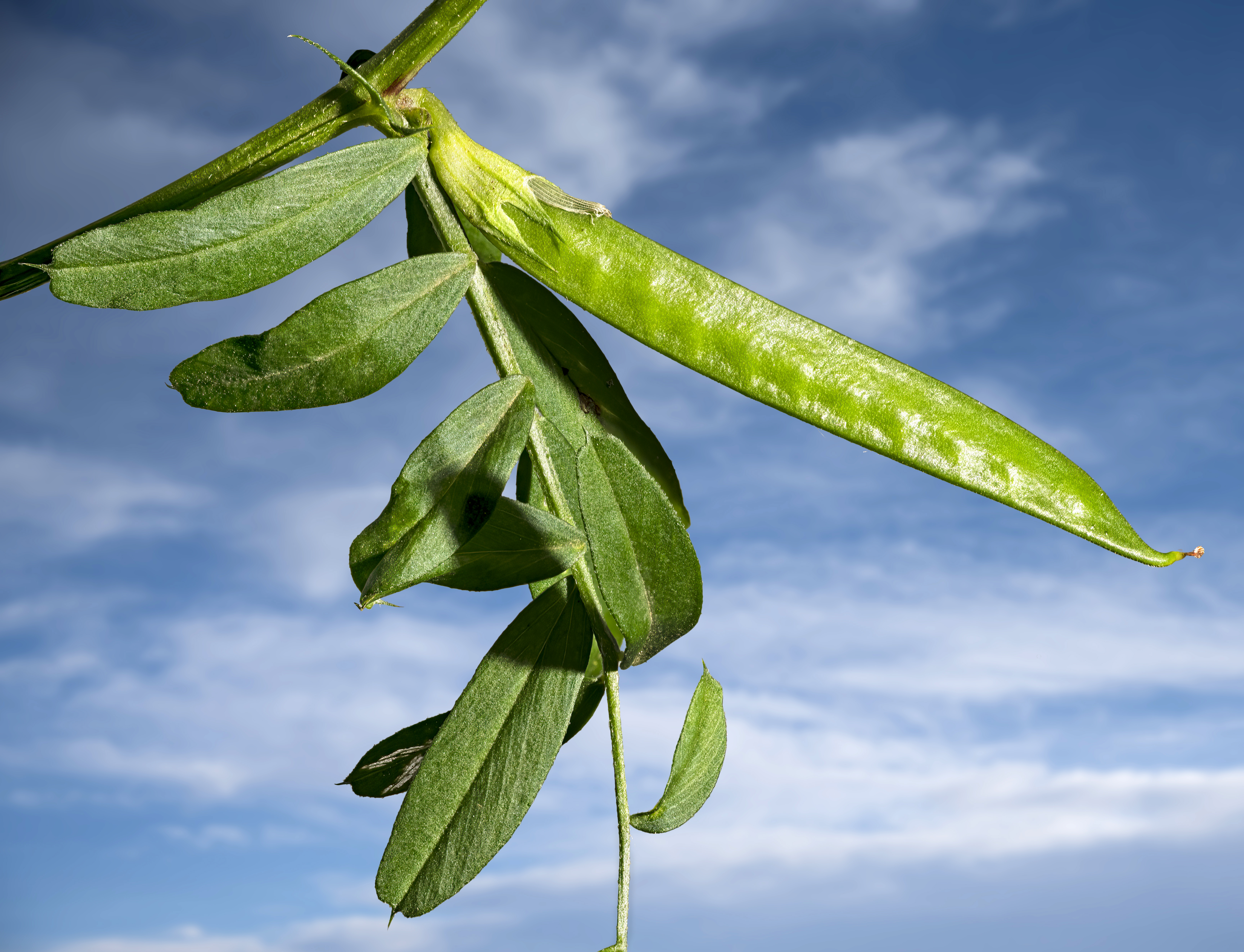
Immature fruit

== Cultivation ==
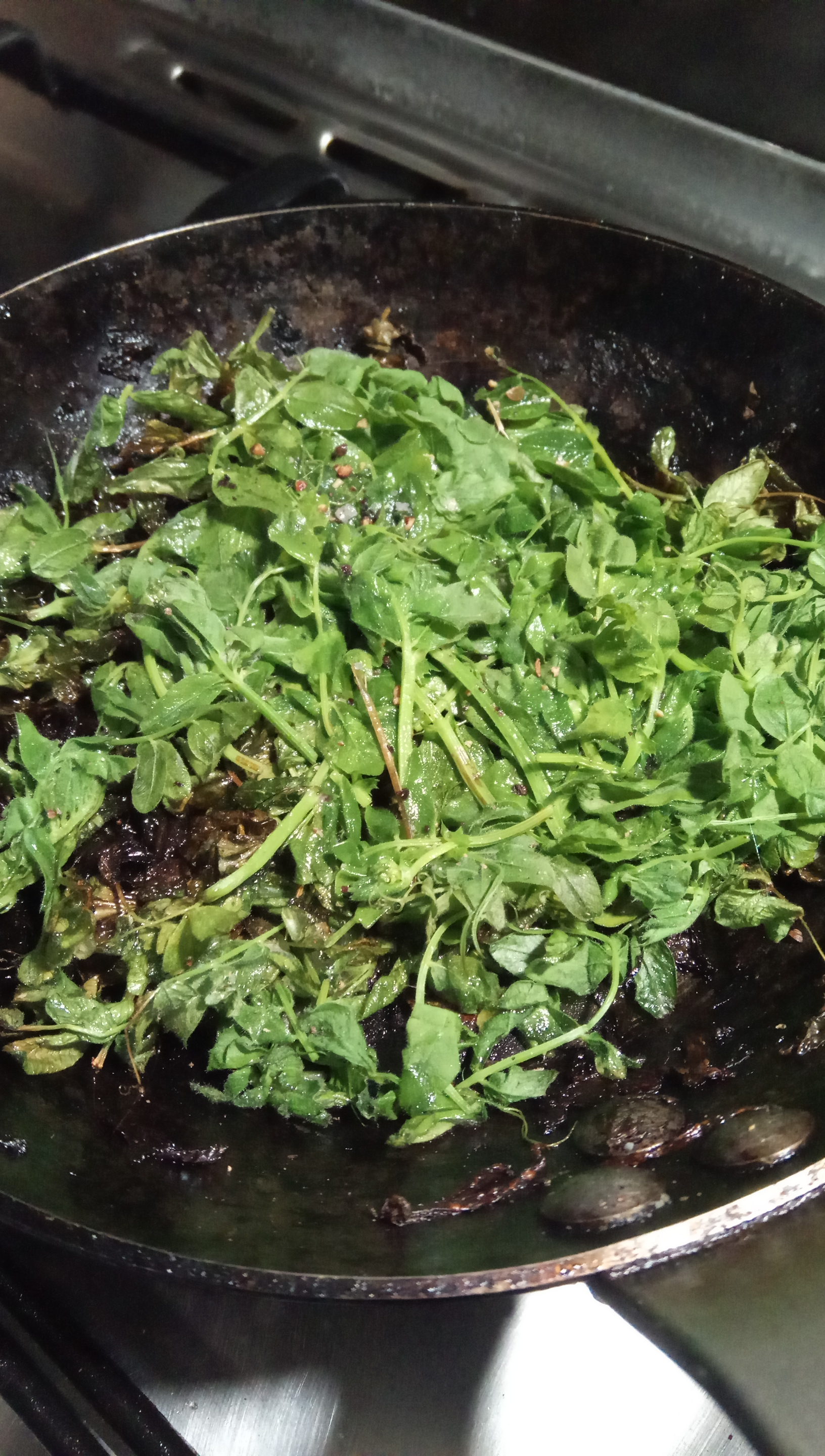
Cooked vetch (Vicia sativa)

Sown for fodder, the seed is sown densely, up to 250 kilograms per hectare (220 lb/acre). However, when grown for seed, less seed is used so that the crop is not too thick, which reduces flower and seed production. When meant for seed, sowing is done early in the planting season for good returns; but, when for green manure, any time in spring is suitable. Sometimes, a full crop can be obtained even when sown as late as summer, though sowing so late is not recommended.

After the seed is sown and the land carefully harrowed, a light roller ought to be drawn across, to smooth the surface and permit the scythe to work without interruption. Also, the field should be watched for several days to prevent pigeons from eating too much of the sown seed.

Horses thrive very well on common vetch, even better than on clover and rye grass; the same applies to fattening cattle, which feed faster on vetch than on most grasses or other edible plants. Danger often arises from livestock eating too much vetch, especially when podded; colics and other stomach disorders are apt to be produced by the excessive amounts devoured.

Cereal grains can be sown with vetch so it can use their stronger stems for support, attaching via tendrils. When grown with oats or other grasses, the vetch can grow upright; otherwise its weak stems may sprawl along the ground. Several cultivars are available for agricultural use, and as for some other legume crops, rhizobia can be added to the seed.

Pests that attack this crop include the powdery mildew fungus Erysiphe baeumleri, the pea aphid Acyrthosiphon pisum, the corn earworm (Heliothis zea), the fall armyworm (Spodoptera frugiperda), and spider mites of genus Tetranychus.

During the early 20th century, a mutant of the common vetch arose with lens-shaped seeds resembling those of the lentil, leading to vetch invasions of lentil fields. D. G. Rowlands showed in 1959 that this was due to a single recessive mutation. The transition from traditional winnowing to mechanised farming practices largely solved this problem.

Improved varieties of Vicia sativa developed by the National Vetch Breeding Program for Australian farmers include; Timok, Volga, Rasina and more recently Studenica. These varieties are mostly cultivated in Western Australia, South Australia and Victoria. More than 500,000 hectares (1,200,000 acres) per year of Vicia sativa was grown in Australia in 2019.

== History ==
Common vetch has long been part of the human diet, as attested by carbonised remains found at early Neolithic sites in Syria, Turkey, Bulgaria, Hungary and Slovakia. It has also been reported from Predynastic sites of ancient Egypt, and several Bronze Age sites in Turkmenia and Slovakia. However, definite evidence for later vetch cultivation is available only for Roman times.

Although V. sativa is sometimes known as tare, the "tare" referred to in some English translations of the Bible (as in the "Parable of the Tares") is thought to be darnel ryegrass, Lolium temulentum.

== Taxonomy ==
Vicia sativa was first described by Carl Linnaeus in his 1753 Species Plantarum. Since that time, a number of synonyms have published:

- Vicia abyssinica Alef.
- Vicia alba Moench
- Vicia amphicarpa Dorthes
- Vicia amphicarpa L.
- Vicia angustifolia L.
- Vicia angustifolia Reichard
- Vicia bacla Moench
- Vicia bobartii E. Forster
- Vicia bobartii E.Forst.
- Vicia bobartii Koch
- Vicia canadensis Zuccagni
- Vicia communis Rouy
- Vicia consobrina Pomel
- Vicia cordata Hoppe
- Vicia cornigera Chaub.
- Vicia cornigera St.-Amans
- Vicia cosentini Guss.
- Vicia cuneata Gren. & Godr.
- Vicia cuneata Guss.
- Vicia debilis Perez Lara
- Vicia erythosperma Rchb.
- Vicia glabra Schleich.
- Vicia globosa Retz.
- Vicia heterophylla C.Presl
- Vicia incisa M.Bieb.
- Vicia incisaeformis Stef.
- Vicia intermedia Viv.
- Vicia lanciformis Lange
- Vicia lentisperma auctor ign.
- Vicia leucosperma Moench
- Vicia macrocarpa Bertol.
- Vicia maculata C.Presl
- Vicia maculata Rouy
- Vicia melanosperma Rchb.
- Vicia morisiana Boreau
- Vicia nemoralis Boreau
- Vicia nemoralis Ten.
- Vicia notota Gilib.
- Vicia pallida Baker
- Vicia pilosa M.Bieb.
- Vicia pimpinelloides Mauri
- Vicia segetalis Thuill.
- Vicia subterranea Dorthes
- Vicia terana Losa
- Vicia vulgaris Uspensky

There are at least four generally accepted subspecies:

- Vicia sativa subsp. cordata (Hoppe) Asch. & Graebn.
- Vicia sativa subsp. nigra (L.) Ehrh. – narrow-leaved vetch (= subsp. / var. angustifolia, subsp. consobrina, subsp. cordata (Hoppe) Batt., subsp. cuneata, subsp. heterophylla, var. minor, var. nigra)
- Vicia sativa subsp. sativa (= var. linearis, ssp. notata)
- Vicia sativa subsp. segetalis (Thuill.) Arcang. (sometimes included in subsp. nigra)

== Genome ==
The Vicia sativa karyotype consists of 5, 6 or 7 chromosomes, with six (n=6) being the most common and best described. Given the Vicia sativa's genome is relatively large genome size (1.75Gb) due to large amounts of repetitive DNA, sequencing the genome was challenging compared to other legumes such as Medicago truncatula or soybeans.

A high-quality chromosome level genome assembly was published in 2022 of variety Studencia (n=6), following a draft genome assembly of line KSR5 (n=7). Variety Studencia, is predicted to have 53,318 protein coding genes. Whole genome sequence comparisons showed that Vicia sativa is most closely related to pea.

A high-quality genome sequence facilitates the application of genome editing and genomic selection for healthy, higher yielding varieties.
