= ATOSA =

Protein-coding gene in the species Homo sapiens

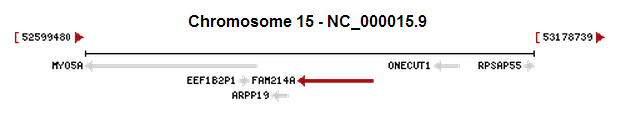

Identifiers
- Aliases: ATOSA, KIAA1370, family with sequence similarity 214 member A, FAM214A, Atos Homolog A
- External IDs: MGI: 2387648; GeneCards: ATOSA

Gene location (Human)
Chr.	Chromosome 15 (human)
Band	15q21.2-q21.3	Start	52,581,317 bp
Band	15q21.2-q21.3	End	52,709,817 bp

Gene location (Mouse)
Chr.	Chromosome 9 (mouse)
Band	9|9 D	Start	74,860,166 bp
Band	9|9 D	End	74,939,750 bp
RNA expression pattern
Bgee	Human / Mouse (ortholog); Top expressed in: skin of arm; nasal epithelium; body of pancreas; tibialis anterior muscle; cardiac muscle tissue of right atrium; deltoid muscle; gastric mucosa; right uterine tube; oral cavity; gastrocnemius muscle / Top expressed in: otolith organ; utricle; primary oocyte; secondary oocyte; zygote; interventricular septum; superior cervical ganglion; left lobe of liver; adrenal gland; olfactory tubercle; More reference expression data
BioGPS	n/a
Orthologs
Databases	NCBI: entry; OMA: entry
Species	Human	Mouse
Entrez	56204	235493
Ensembl	ENSG00000047346	ENSMUSG00000034858
UniProt	Q32MH5	Q69ZK7
RefSeq (mRNA)	NM_001286495; NM_019600	NM_001113283; NM_153584; NM_001359816
RefSeq (protein)	NP_001273424; NP_062546	NP_001106754; NP_705812; NP_001346745
Location (UCSC)	Chr 15: 52.58 – 52.71 Mb	Chr 9: 74.86 – 74.94 Mb
PubMed search
- Wikidata
View/Edit Human	View/Edit Mouse

Atos homolog protein A (or ATOSA) is a protein that, in humans, is encoded by the ATOSA gene (previously FAM214A). Not much has been reported about the function of ATOSA, but it is predicted to be a transcription regulator that promotes macrophage invasion into tissues.

== Gene ==
=== Overview ===
The FAM214A gene is located on the negative DNA strand (see Sense (molecular biology)) of chromosome 15 between position 52,873,514 and 53,002,014; thus making the gene 97,303 base pairs (bp) long. FAM214A has been previously labeled with two other aliases, known as KIAA1370 and FLJ10980. The FAM214A gene is predicted to contain 12 exons which comprise the final 4231 bp mRNA transcript after transcription has occurred. It is this mRNA product that is then translated into the final FAM214A protein with the help of the promoter sequence and transcription factors. The promoter for the FAM214A mRNA sequence was predicted and analyzed by the El Dorado program on Genomatix. This promoter is 601 base pairs long and spans a portion of the 5' UTR.

FAM214A location on chromosome 15

Diagram of the FAM214A gene including introns and exons on chromosome 15

=== Gene expression ===
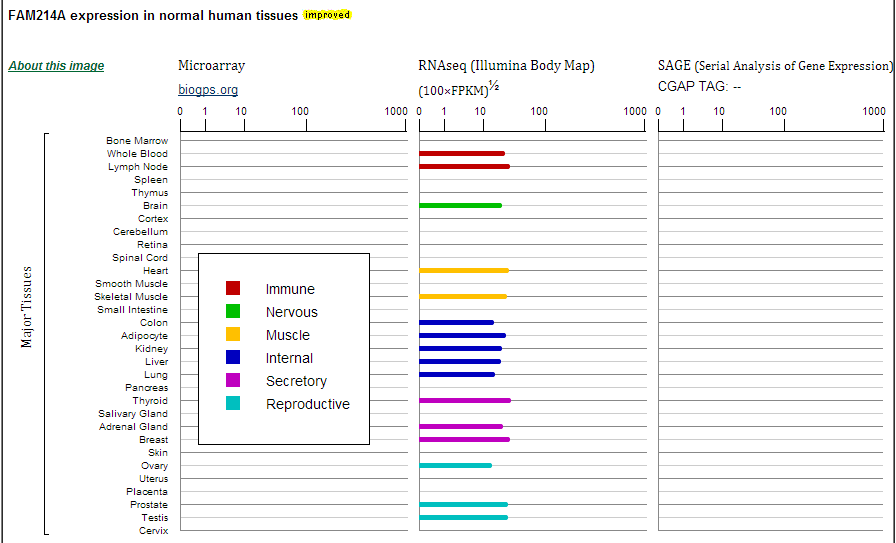
Expression data for FAM214A obtained from Gene Cards

FAM214A is considered to be ubiquitously expressed (or very nearly so) in low levels according to a number of sources such as BioGPS and the Expression Atlas. As can be seen in the BioGPS image below, there is a significantly higher expression level in immune-related cells and tissues, thus suggesting an immune role; however, there has been no specific in situ evidence to support this claim. Expression data has been collected from a number of studies performed on a large range of genes, therefore, some of the data is contradictory in nature.

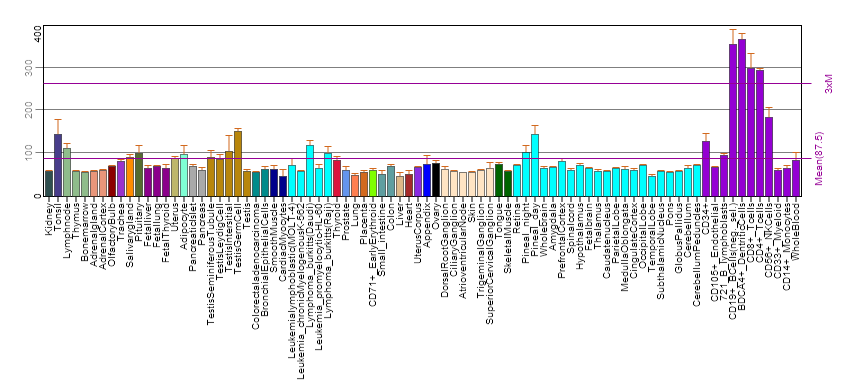
Expression data for FAM214A obtained from BioGPS

== Protein ==
=== Overview ===
The function of the FAM214A protein in humans is still unknown; however, there are three functional term associations including "biological process," "cellular component," and molecular function," that describe the function of this protein on The Gene Ontology which predict implications of its primary function in vivo. The protein product of FAM214A consists of 1076 amino acids (aa), has been predicted to have a molecular mass of 121,700 daltons, and has an isoelectric point around pH 7.7. This protein is predicted to remain in the nucleus after transcription based upon its lack of signal peptide sequence and the predictions of the program PSORTII. Due to alternative splicing, two other isoforms (Q32MH5-2 and Q32MH5-3) have been observed. They differ slightly from the primary product. Isoform 2 has four different amino acids from bases 960-960 and is missing the end of the sequence from bases 964-1076. Isoform 3 has seven extra amino acids added to the beginning of the sequence after the methionine.

After being translated, the FAM214A protein is predicted to remain in the nucleus by more than one type of subprogram on PSORT II. This protein has a pat4 signal, one of the two "classical" nuclear localization signals (NLSs), starting at residue 709. Although it does not have the second "classical" NLS, pat7, nor the "non-classical" bipartite NLS it is still predicted to be targeted for the nucleus by the NCNN score. This score predicts whether the protein is targeted for the nucleus or the cytoplasm based upon the amino acid sequence. For the FAM214A protein, the NCNN score predicted nuclear localization with 94.1% certainty. Based upon this information, PSORT generates an overall prediction of the protein's subcellular localization. For FAM214A, the predicted values were 69.6% for the nucleus as compared to 13.0% for the mitochondria, 8.7% for the cytoplasm, and 4.3% for the secretory vesicles and endoplasmic reticulum.

=== Post-translational modifications ===
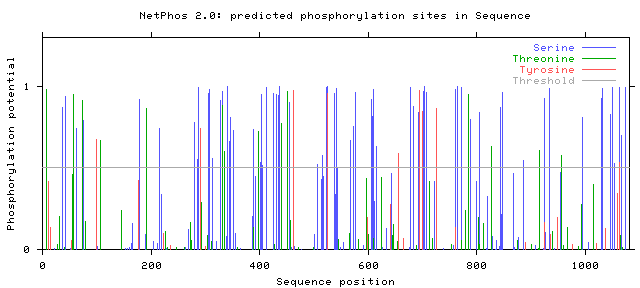
Predicted phosphorylated sites found within the FAM214A protein

This protein most likely does not undergo a significant number of post-translational modifications due to the lack of signal peptide sequence predicted by NetNGlyc and NetOGlyc on the ExPASy web server. This is because much of the intracellular machinery performing post-translational modifications requires the protein to move through organelles such as the endoplasmic reticulum and Golgi apparatus. Without a signal peptide sequence, the protein generally does not leave the nucleus, which was predicted by PSORT II as described above.

A SAPS analysis of this protein was performed against the swp23s.q database, which indicated the presence of an abnormally large number of serine amino acids and an abnormally small number of alanine amino acids in this protein. According to a review article by Fayard et al., phosphoinositide-dependent kinase 2 (PDK2) is a serine/threonine kinase that is important for regulating cell cycle. Because the FAM214A protein has a larger number of serine groups than is considered normal, there is the possibility that PDK2 has an important effect on this protein. In order to determine whether the excessive number of serines were actually predicted to be phosphorylated, the protein sequence was run through the program NetPhos from the ExPASy webserver. This program predicted the phosphorylation of 69 serines, 14 threonines, and 9 tyrosines. According to the SAPS analysis from above, there are a total or 134 serines, thus indicating that approximately half are predicted to be phosphorylated in vivo. A diagram of the phosphorylation predictions is shown to the right.

One other type of post-translational modification was predicted for the FAM214A protein by the program NetCorona on ExPASy. The program predicted a single cleavage site between position 214 and 215 in the FAM214A protein sequence after translation.

=== Protein interactions ===
There are number of transcription factor binding sites predicted for the FAM214A promoter sequence. A few of the ones with the highest predicted confidence are provided in the table below.

Possible Transcription Factors Predicted to Bind to the FAM214A Promoter Sequence

Predicted Transcription Factor	Start	End	Strand	Confidence
Transcription factor II B (TFIIB) recognition element	97	103	Negative	1.0
Myeloid zinc finger protein MZF1	151	161	Negative	1.0
Myelin transcription factor 1-like, neuronal C2HC zinc finger factor 1	388	400	Negative	0.945
Androgene receptor binding site, IR3 sites	495	513	Negative	0.923
Wilms Tumor Suppressor	1	17	Positive	0.968
Non-palindromic nuclear factor I binding sites	27	47	Positive	0.988
Alternative splicing variant of FOXP1, activated in ESCs	383	383	Positive	1.0
Pleomorphic adenoma gene 1	488	510	Positive	1.0
ETS-like gene 1 (ELK-1)	569	589	Positive	0.961

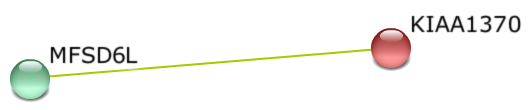
FAM214A non-transcription factor predicted protein interaction

The only protein predicted according STRING to interact with the FAM214A protein is called MFSD6L. This protein belongs to the major facilitator superfamily is predicted to be a transmembrane protein. Like FAM214A, the function of this protein has not yet been characterized through experimentation or research. Because this MFSD6L protein is the only FAM214A protein interaction predicted with any certainty, the sequence for it was run through the PSORT II program. The data from the NLS subprogram predicted the presence of a single pat4 and two pat7 NLS sequences, thus indicating possible nuclear localization. The NCNN score, on the other hand, predicted cytoplasmic localization with 94.1% certainty, thus leaving the overall PSORT II score at 39.1% plasma membrane, 39.1% endoplasmic reticulum, 4.3% vacuolar, 4.3% vesicles of secretory system, 4.3% Golgi, 4.3% mitochondrial, and 4.3% nuclear. This is contradictory as there are three total nuclear localization signals, but this may be due to the fact that the significant transmembrane nature of the MFSD6L protein may be causing issues with these predictions.

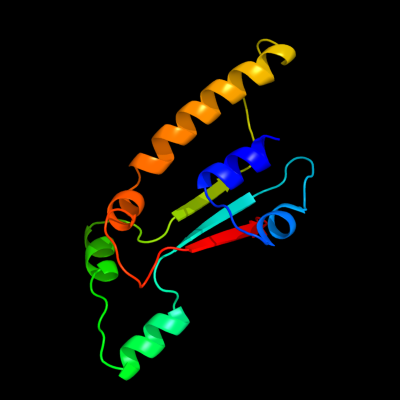
Small percentage of FAM214A tertiary structure

=== Secondary and tertiary structure ===
The secondary structure of the FAM214A protein consists of a number of alpha helices and beta sheets as predicted by Biology Workbench and Protein Homology/analogY Recognition Engine (PHYRE). The PHYRE program predicts that 66 percent of the FAM214A secondary structure is disordered and therefore unable to be analyzed and converted into a tertiary structure prediction. It was; however, able to predict approximately 10 percent of the protein's structure with 95 percent significance. The diagram for this is shown to the left.

== Conservation ==
=== Paralog ===
A single paralogous gene has been found on chromosome 9 in Homo sapiens and is named FAM214B (family with sequence similarity, B). FAM214B, although considered a paralog, has a significantly different protein sequence from that of FAM214A. When the two were compared against each other on NCBI's BLAST, the only significant similarity observed was within the last 200 amino acids (where the DUF4210 and Chromosome_Seg domains are located). Although the similarity between FAM214A and B is low, these two proteins are in the same protein family and contain the same two conserved domains.

=== Orthologs ===
The FAM214A protein has a significant number of orthologs across a large number of taxonomic groups including Mammalia, Aves, Reptilia, Amphibia, Actinopterygii, Echinoidea, Insecta, Trematoda, Crustacea, Tricoplacia, Anthozoa, and Eurotiomycetes. This indicates that the FAM214A protein is well conserved within Eukaryotes but does not appear to be conserved in Bacteria or Archaea. In all orthologs, the most-conserved region was near the end of the protein where the conserved domains are (see below). Orthologs for the human FAM214A protein were found as far back as Tuber melanosporum, Talaromyces stipitatus, and Aspergillus nidulans, which all diverged approximately 1215 million years ago.

Orthologs for the FAM214A Protein

Genus Species	Common name	Divergence from human liineage (MYA)	NCBI protein accession number	Sequence length	Percent identity to human sequence	Common gene name
Homo sapiens	Human	-	NP_062546.2	1076	100	FAM214A
Pan troglodytes	Common Chimpanzee	6.3	XP_003314724	1083	99	FAM214A
Pan paniscus	Bonobo	6.3	XP_003827895.1	1076	100	FAM214A
Rattus norvegicus	Rat	92.3	NP_001100308	1074	100	LOC300836
Bos taurus	Cow	94.2	XP_601152	1087	100	KIAA1370
Canus lupus familiaris	Dog	94.2	XP_544682	1081	100	KIAA1370
Ornithorhynchus anatinus	Platypus	167.4	XP_001515207	1169	95	KIAA1370
Gallus gallus	Chicken	296.0	NP_001005811	1093	99	FAM214A
Taeniopygia guttata	Zebra Finch	296.0	XP_002196177	1112	99	FAM214A
Anolis carolinensis	Carolina Anole	296.0	XP_003227400	1086	99	KIAA1370
Xenopus tropicalis	Tropical Clawed Frog	371.2	NP_001015702	946	98	FAM214A
Danio rerio	Zebrafish	400.1	NP_001189349	1021	75	FAM214A
Apis mellifera	Honey Bee	782.7	XP_393903	1339	45	LOC410423
Strongylocentrotus purpuratus	Sea Urchin	742.9	XP_799179	297	27	FAM214A-like
Drosophila melanogaster	Fruit Fly	782.7	NP_610688	1297	27	CG9005
Schistosoma mansoni	Schistosome Parasite	792.4	XP_002579285	766	26	Hypothetical Protein
Daphnia pulex	Common Water Flea	782.7	EFX87516	200	18	Hypothetical Protein DAPPUDRAFT_207300
Nematostella vectensis	Sea Anemone	855.3 mya	XP_001633540	191	18	Hypothetical Protein
Tuber melanosporum	Truffle	1215.8	XP_002841833	622	15	Hypothetical Protein
Talaromyces stipitatus	-	1215.8	XP_002478567	797	25	Conserved Hypothetical Protein
Aspergillus nidulans	Filamentous Fungus	1215.8	XP_658605	728	15	hypothetical protein AN1001.2

=== Phylogeny ===
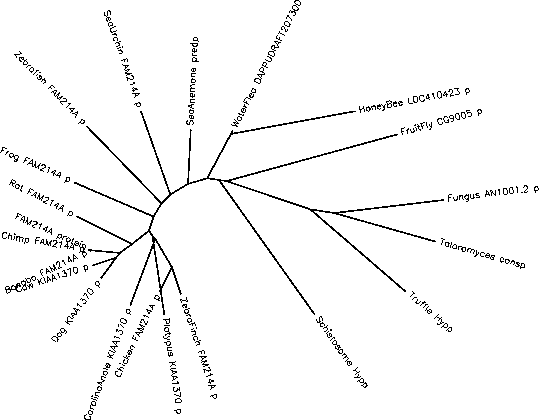
The evolutionary relationship between FAM214A and its orthologous proteins

An unrooted phylogenetic tree of 20 orthologs was generated by the CLUSTALW program on Biology Workbench to demonstrate the evolutionary relationship between FAM214A and its orthologs.

=== Conserved domains ===
Within the FAM214A protein, there are three well-conserved regions. These include a well-conserved region near the n-terminus of the protein and two conserved domains including the Domain of Unknown Function 4210 (DUF4210) and a Chromosome_Seg domain near the c-terminus. A schematic diagram of these three regions is shown below. The well-conserved region near the n-terminus of the protein is not predicted to contain any known domains or motifs; however, the cleavage site predicted by NetCorona above is located within this region and it is well-conserved in a majority of the proteins orthologous to FAM214A. The two conserved domains located at the end of this protein are the most important portion of the peptide based upon evolutionary history. All organisms in the Ortholog table above except the platypus (which is missing the Chromosome_Seg domain) contain both of these conserved domains within their protein sequence.

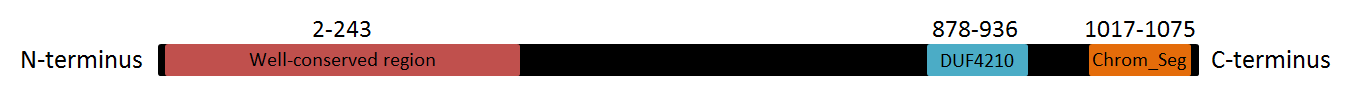
Schematic of the Homo sapiens FAM214A protein diagramming well-conserved regions and their locations
