= Leptolinea tardivitalis =

Scientific classification
- Domain: Bacteria
- Kingdom: Bacillati
- Phylum: Chloroflexota
- Class: Anaerolineae
- Order: Anaerolineales
- Family: Anaerolineaceae
- Genus: Leptolinea
- Species: L. tardivitalis

Binomial name
- Leptolinea tardivitalis Yamada et al. 2006

Species of bacterium

Leptolinea tardivitalis is a mesophilic, non-spore-forming, non-motile, Gram-negative, filamentous bacteria with type strain YMTK-2^{T} (=JCM 12579^{T} =DSM 16556^{T}), the type species of its genus.
