= MFSD6L =

Protein-coding gene in the species Homo sapiens

Identifiers
- Aliases: MFSD6L, major facilitator superfamily domain containing 6 like
- External IDs: MGI: 2384904; GeneCards: MFSD6L

Gene location (Human)
Chr.	Chromosome 17 (human)
Band	17p13.1	Start	8,797,110 bp
Band	17p13.1	End	8,799,365 bp

Gene location (Mouse)
Chr.	Chromosome 11 (mouse)
Band	11|11 B3	Start	68,447,012 bp
Band	11|11 B3	End	68,449,071 bp
RNA expression pattern
Bgee	Human / Mouse (ortholog); Top expressed in: left testis; sperm; right testis; body of pancreas; islet of Langerhans; rectum; olfactory zone of nasal mucosa; mucosa of transverse colon; minor salivary glands; left lobe of thyroid gland / Top expressed in: spermatocyte; spermatid; jejunum; intestinal villus; granulocyte; embryo; duodenum; ileum; morula; vestibular membrane of cochlear duct; More reference expression data
BioGPS	n/a
Orthologs
Databases	NCBI: entry; OMA: entry
Species	Human	Mouse
Entrez	162387	215723
Ensembl	ENSG00000185156	ENSMUSG00000048329
UniProt	Q8IWD5	Q8R3N2
RefSeq (mRNA)	NM_152599	NM_146004
RefSeq (protein)	NP_689812	NP_666116
Location (UCSC)	Chr 17: 8.8 – 8.8 Mb	Chr 11: 68.45 – 68.45 Mb
PubMed search
- Wikidata
View/Edit Human	View/Edit Mouse

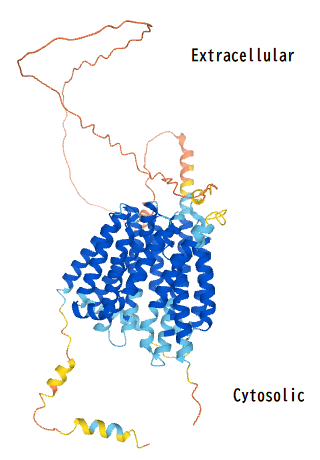
Predicted Tertiary Structure of the MFSD6L Protein

Major facilitator superfamily domain containing 6 like (MFSD6L) is a protein encoded by the MFSD6L gene in humans. The MFSD6L protein is a transmembrane protein that is part of the major facilitator superfamily (MFS) that uses chemiosmotic gradients to facilitate the transport of small solutes across cell membranes.

== Gene ==
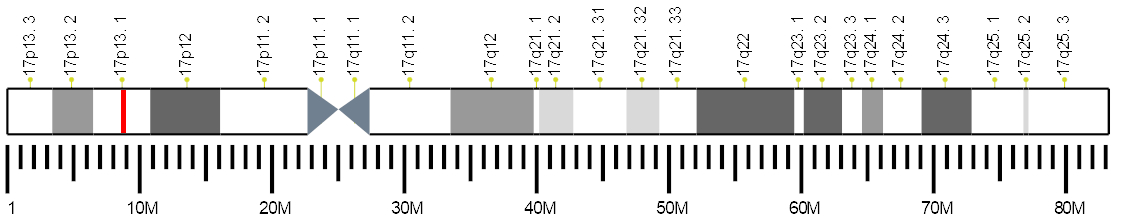
A figure depicting the location (17p13.1) of the Homo sapiens MFSD6L gene on chromosome 17.

In the human genome, the MFSD6L gene is located on chromosome 17 (17p13.1). The DNA sequence encoding the polypeptide encompasses 2,256 bases, starting from 8,797,110 bp to 8,799,365 bp. Additionally, the gene sequence resides on the minus strand. The MFSD6L gene has one alias called FLJ35773.

The encoding DNA sequence results in only one exon in the translated mRNA sequence.

The tumor suppressor gene TP53 was also found within the gene neighborhood of MFSD6L at 17p13.1.

== mRNA Transcript ==
The MFSD6L gene was not found to have other isoforms due to the presence of only one exon in the MFSD6L encoding sequence.

== Protein ==
The MFSD6L protein has a precursor molecular weight of approximately 64 kDa, consisting of 586 amino acids. After post-translational modifications, such as glycosylation, the mature MFSD6L protein's molecular weight increases to 72 kDa. Of the amino acids consisting the MFSD6L protein, leucine was found to have increased levels compared to most other human proteins. This increase in leucine is also present in the MFSD6L protein of the house mouse and chimpanzee. The protein also has an isoelectric point of 8.87 pI.

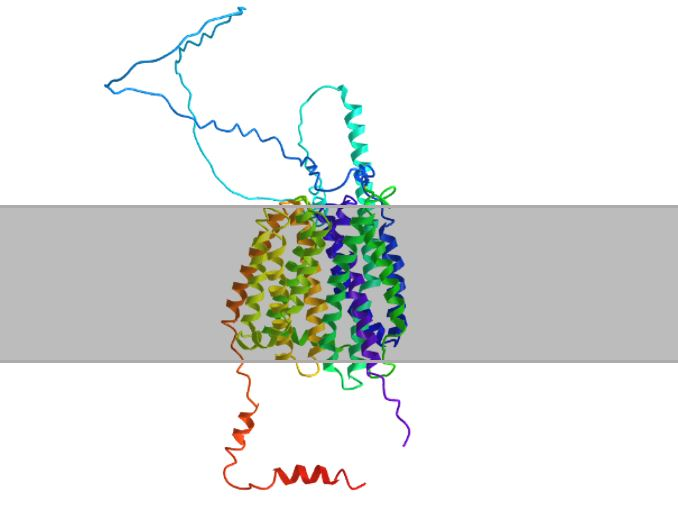
MFSD6L predicted tertiary structure with greyed area signifying cell membrane region

The peptide sequence contains 11 transmembrane regions that cross the plasma membrane. Additionally, there are also two MFS regions starting at the 28th and 368th encoding amino acids.

For the secondary structure of the MFSD6L protein, there are 16 predicted alpha helices and 3 predicted beta sheets. The large amount of alpha helices within the structure of MFSD6L can be attributed to the protein being a transmembrane solute transporter since alpha helices are usually the part of the protein's structure that is positioned within the cell membrane.

Within the tertiary structure, there was a disulfide bond predicted between the two cysteines at the 29th and 311th amino acids.

== Expression and regulation ==
=== Gene level ===
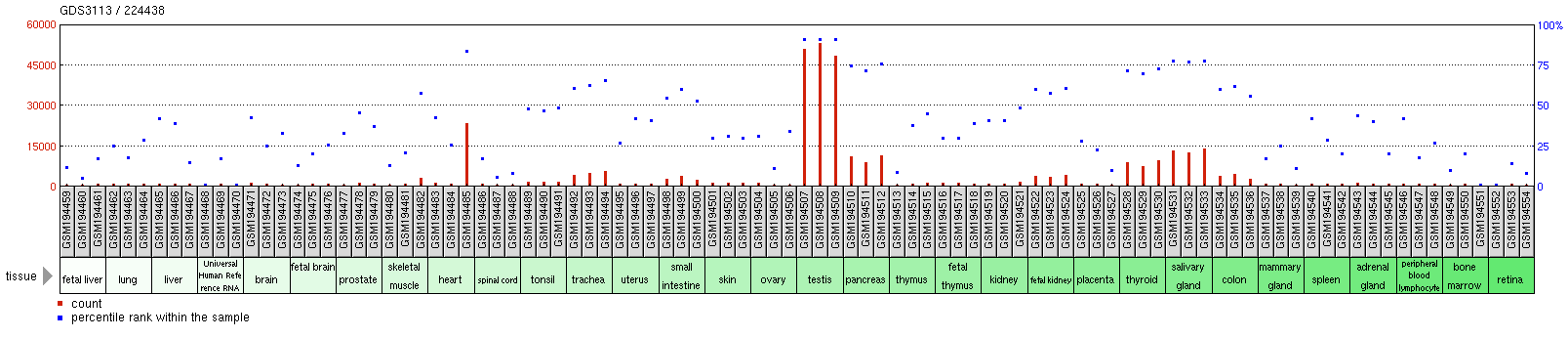
Tissue expression by array profiling of MFSD6L gene

There was only one promoter region, spanning 1,107 bp, found for MFSD6L using the Genomatix Gene2Promoter database. For the part of the promoter region closest to the start of the 5' UTR of the MFSD6L gene, there were several transcription factor binding sites found. A transcription factor binding site of note was the site for the p53 tumor suppressor protein.

The MFSD6L gene was found to be highly expressed in the pancreas, salivary glands, and the thyroid.

Inspection of in-situ hybridization expression of MFSD6L gene shows that the gene is particularly expressed within glandular cells within their respective tissues.

Expression of the MFSD6L was found to be upregulated as a result of glucose starvation.

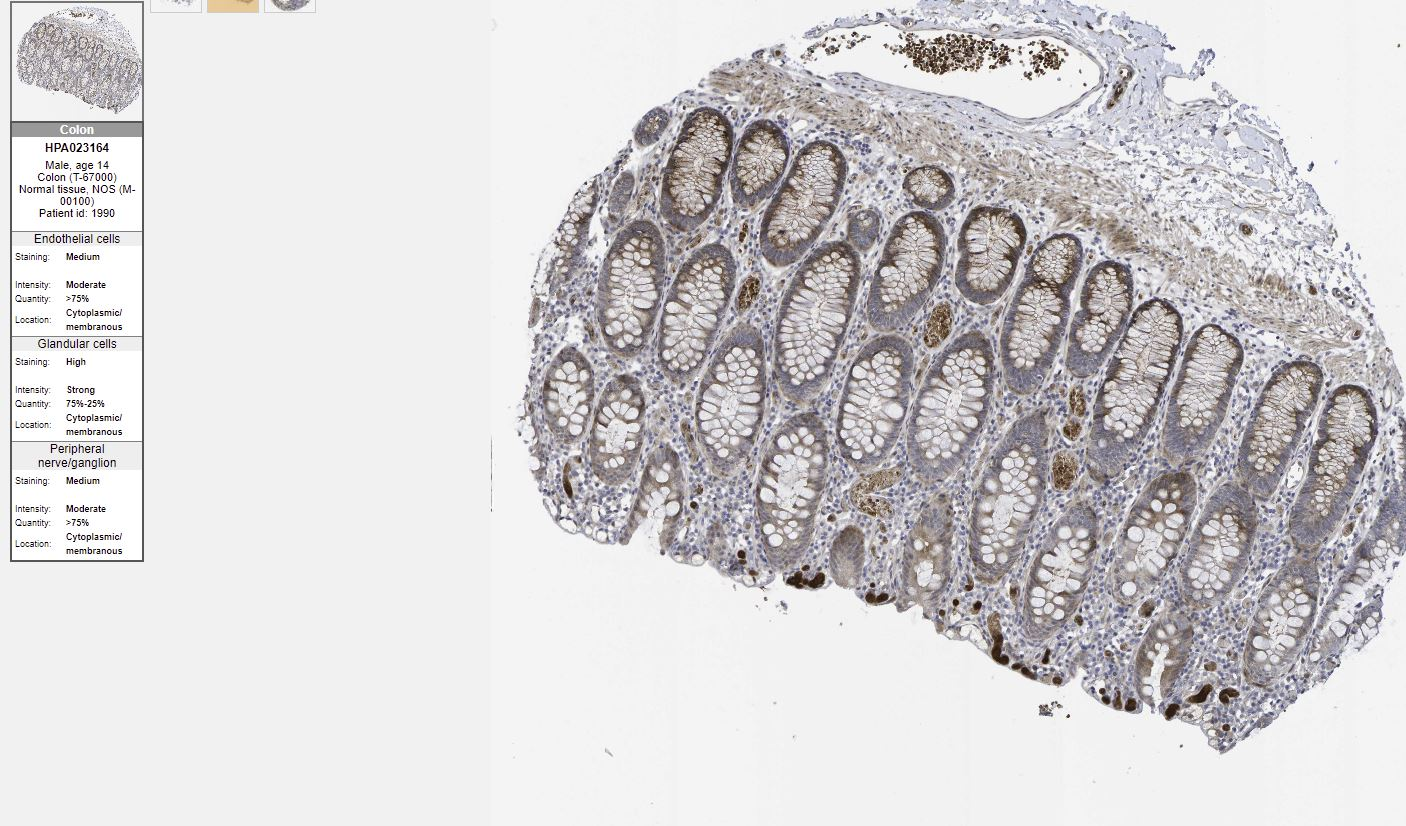
In-situ hybridization of MFSD6L protein in colorectal tissue. Highest abundance found within glandular cells of the colorectal tissue.

=== Transcript level ===
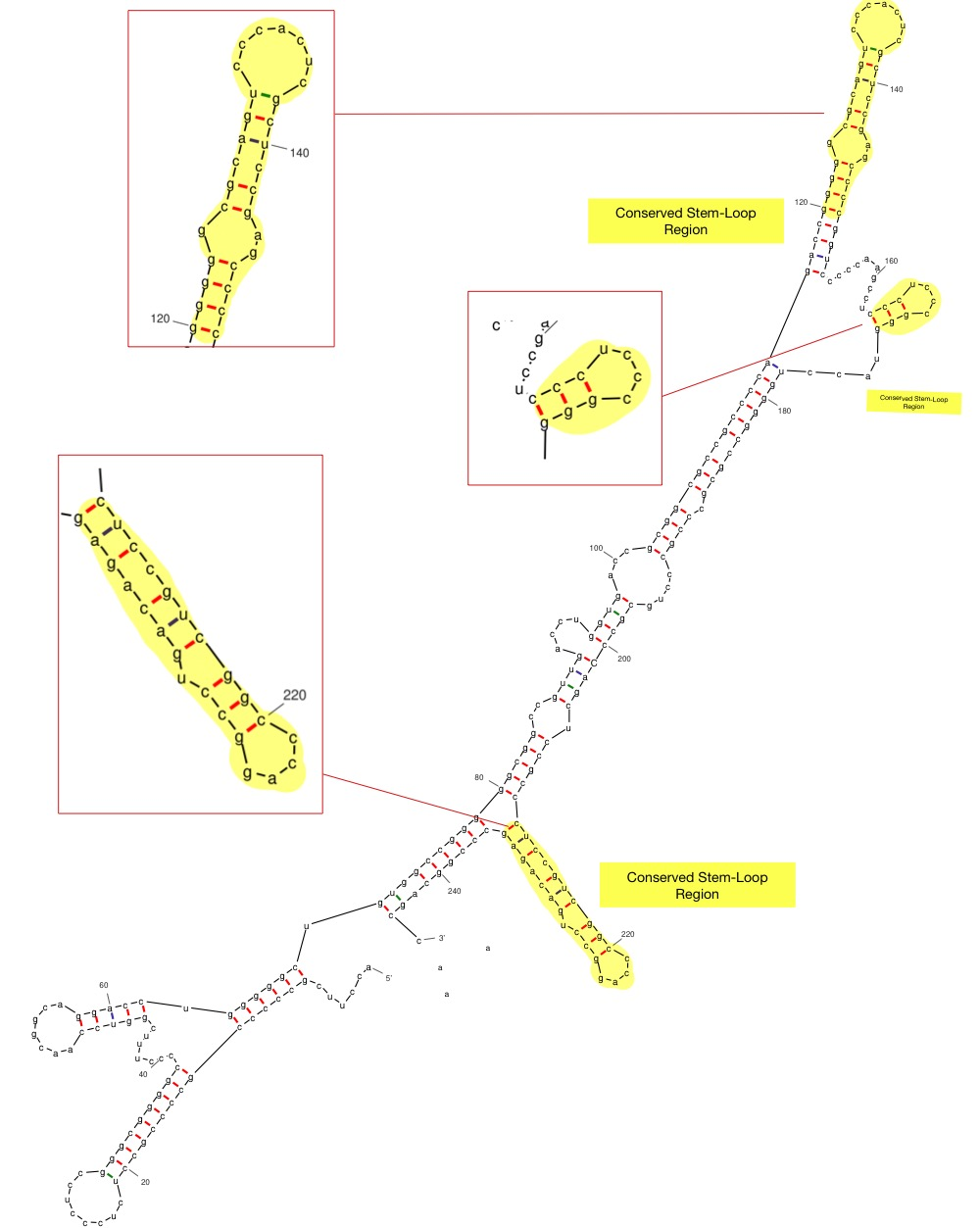
Secondary structure of MFSD6L mRNA 5' UTR

Since there is only one exon and no introns within the MFSD6L gene, There is no splicing performed on the MFSD6L mRNA. Translation of the MFSD6L protein initiates at the end of the 5' UTR, which is the first 245 nucleotides of the MFSD6L mRNA. There are conserved stem-loop regions across mammalian orthologs, which infer possible miRNA binding sites.

=== Protein level ===
The subcellular localization of the MFSD6L protein is predicted to be within the cell membrane via DeepLoc tool. This is supported by it being a solute symporter similar to MFS proteins. The first 28 amino acids of the translated MFSD6L protein contains the signal peptide.

Additionally, n-glycosylation sites were predicted at the 110th, 129th, and 224th amino acids of the protein sequence. A serine phosphorylation site at the 429th amino acid was also predicted and verified by presence within other mammalian orthologs.

== Evolution ==
=== Paralogs ===
The MFSD6 protein was found to be the only paralog to the human MFSD6L protein.

=== Orthologs ===
Through BLAST sequence analysis, the MFSD6L protein was found to have orthologs in a many mammalian species, especially among primates, and flying foxes. There were some orthologs found in the Reptilia and Amphibia classes, albeit not as great in number as in the Mammalia. Among fish, there were significantly more orthologs found amongst ray-finned fishes than cartilaginous fishes. Additionally, the jaw-less fish, the sea lamprey, was also found to be an ortholog.

There were also multiple orthologs found amongst invertebrates, such as echinoderms and mollusks.

No significant orthologs of the MFSD6L protein were found amongst insects; however there were orthologs found in the bacteria. Specifically, the Anaerolinea genus, which contains thermophilic bacteria were found to have orthologs with the human protein due to its regions of MFS being identical to MFS regions found in the human protein. The following table shows some examples of orthologs of the human MFSD6L.

Genus and species	Common name	Taxonomic group	Median Time since Divergence (MYA)	Accession number (from NCBI)	Sequence Length (aa)	Sequence Identity (%)	Sequence Similarity (%)
Homo sapiens	Human	Primates	0	NP_689812.3	586	100%	100%
Mus musculus	House Mouse	Rodentia	89	NP_666116.1	586	68%	77%
Monodon monoceros	Narwhal	Artiodactyla	94	XP_029068193.1	595	73%	81%
Molossus molossus	Velvety Free-tailed Bat	Chiroptera	94	XP_036125248.1	600	72%	79%
Dermochelys coriacea	Leatherback Sea Turtle	Testudines	318	XP_038228264.1	653	45%	59%
Terrapene carolina triunguis	Three-toed Box Turtle	Testudines	318	XP_024071382.1	654	44%	57%
Patagioenas fasciata monilis	Band-tailed Pigeon	Columbiformes	318	OPJ90083.1	655	43%	55%
Dromaius novaehollandiae	Emu	Casuariiformes	318	XP_025976398.1	628	42%	55%
Microcaecilia unicolor	Tiny Cayenne Caecilian	Gymnophiona	351.7	XP_030063970.1	652	44%	58%
Xenopus tropicalis	Western-clawed Frog	Anura	351.7	XP_002937042.2	611	42%	56%
Bufo bufo	Common Toad	Anura	351.7	XP_040293432.1	615	39%	54%
Scleropages formosus	Asian Arowana	Osteoglossiformes	433	NP_001003586.1	585	40%	55%
Danio rerio	Zebrafish	Cypriniformes	433	XP_018612492.2	542	33%	49%
Callorhinchus milii	Australian Ghostfish	Chimaeriformes	465	XP_042198386.1	630	41%	57%
Petromyzon marinus	Sea Lamprey	Petromyzontiformes	599	XP_032823230.1	735	26%	38%
Anneissia japonica	Sea Lily	Comatulida	627	XP_033125701.1	616	28%	47%
Gigantopelta aegis	Deep Sea Snail	Neomphalida	736	XP_041362795.1	637	27%	46%
Crassostrea gigas	Pacific Oyster	Ostreida	736	XP_011445242.2	615	25%	44%
Octopus sinesis	East Asian Common Octopus	Octopoda	736	XP_029655326	634	24%	43%
Tetranychus urticae	Red Spider Mite	Trombidiformes	736	XP_015795313.1	872	14%	25%
Anaerolinealis	Anaerolinealis bacterium	Anaerolineales	4090	MBN1451601.1	389	19%	34%

=== Homologous domains ===
The main homologous domains found within the MFSD6L protein are the MFS regions. Since MFS includes a large amount of solute transporter proteins within its superfamily, there are many MFS proteins that have the same homologous MFS domains.

=== Most distant homologs ===
Through BLAST sequence analysis, the most distant homologs were the organisms within the Cnidaria phylum, which mainly consists of jellyfish, sea anemones, and corals. Searching with BLAST for the MFSD6L gene at an older diverging phylum, the Porifera, revealed no homologous MFSD6L protein.

=== Predicted emergence date ===
As a result of the MFSD6L protein's presence in Cnidaria and absence in Porifera, the estimated emergence date of the MFSD6L gene lies between 687 and 777 MYA, which are the divergence dates found from TimeTree. From the corrected % divergence chart and calculations of the corrected % divergence of the Homo sapiens MFSD6 paralog, the estimated date of emergence of the MFSD6L protein was found to be around 736 MYA.

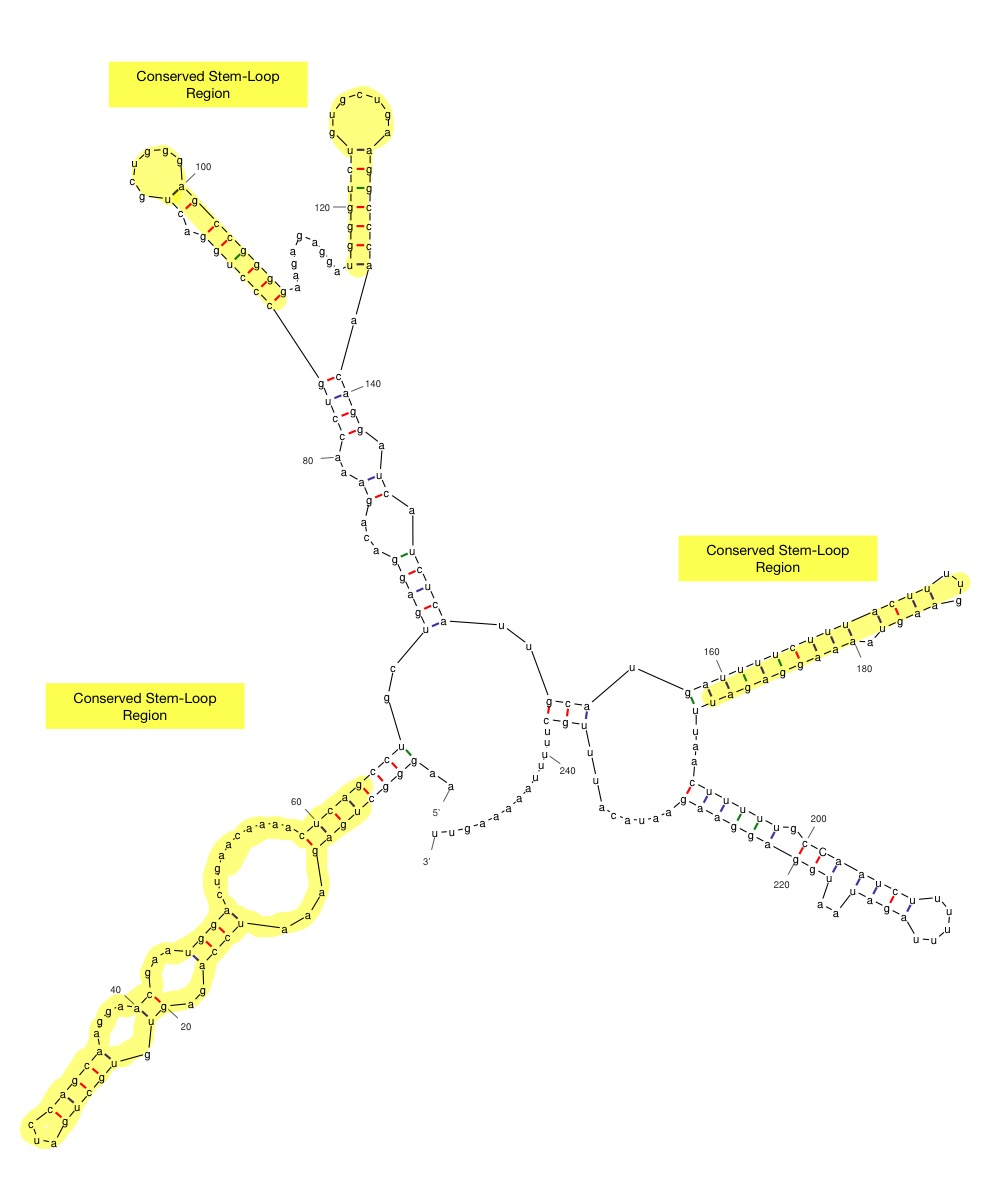
Secondary structure of the MFSD6L mRNA 3' UTR

== Interacting proteins ==
The MFSD6L protein was not found to have any experimentally-verified protein-protein interactions.

== Function ==
The polypeptide sequence contains many transmembrane regions, identifying the MFSD6L protein as a transmembrane protein for transporting solutes across the plasma membrane of a cell. Tertiary structure prediction tools suggest that the structure of the MFSD6L protein is similar to 1PV6A, a β-galactosides symporter which uses proton gradients to transport solutes. As a result, the function of the MFSD6L protein could possibly a sugar symporter. This is additionally supported by the fact that the expression of MFSD6L was upregulated due to glucose starvation.

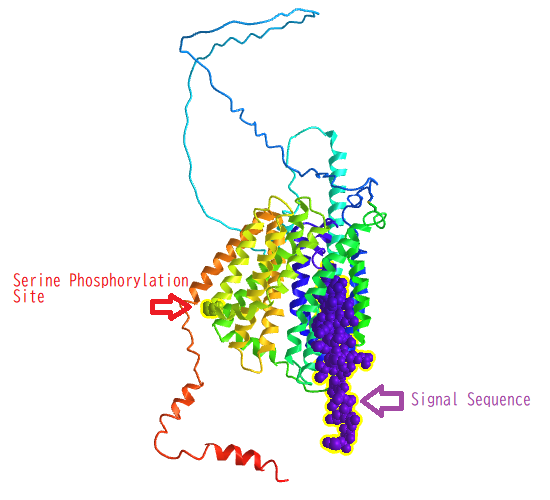
Tertiary structure of the MFSD6L protein with the serine phosphorylation site and signal sequence marked

== Clinical significance ==
=== Disease association ===
A disease associated with the MFSD6L gene is the Tetralogy of Fallot, which is a series of four congenital heart defects that can cause low oxygenation of blood. This is due to a ventricular septal defect that causes the mixing of oxygenated and deoxygenated blood in the left ventricle of the heart.

The MFSD6L gene was also found to be a candidate gene taking part in the disease Pediatric Cataract.

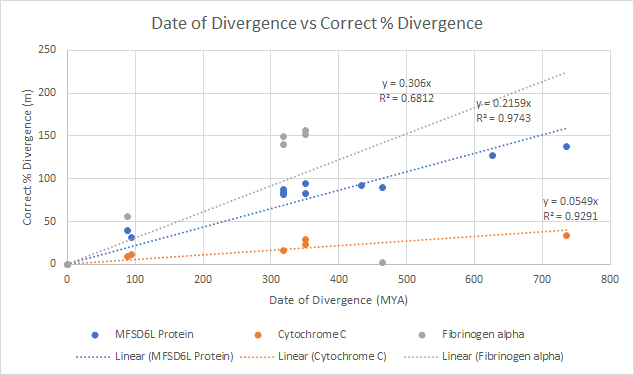
A corrected % divergence chart of the MFSD6L protein. Cytochrome C and Fibrinogen Alpha Chain is also added for comparison.

=== Mutations ===
Various SNP's were found within the encoding sequence of the MFSD6L protein sequence as shown below.

Amino Acid Position	mRNA Position	Original Nucleotide	SNP	Original Amino Acid	Variant Amino Acid	Codon
328	1212	T	T	Ser [S]	Leu [L]	2
399	1424	G	A	Gly [G]	Ser [S]	1
406	1446	C	T	Ser [S]	Leu [L]	2
571	1941	C	T	Thr [T]	Ile [I]	2
574	1949	G	A	Asp [D]	Asn [N]	1
575	1952	T	G	Trp [W]	Gly [G]	1
