= Levilinea saccharolytica =

Scientific classification
- Domain: Bacteria
- Kingdom: Bacillati
- Phylum: Chloroflexota
- Class: Anaerolineae
- Order: Anaerolineales
- Family: Anaerolineaceae
- Genus: Levilinea
- Species: L. saccharolytica

Binomial name
- Levilinea saccharolytica Yamada et al. 2006

Species of bacterium

Levilinea saccharolytica is a mesophilic, non-spore-forming, non-motile, Gram-negative, filamentous bacteria with type strain KIBI-1^{T} (=JCM 12578^{T} =DSM 16555^{T}), the type species of its genus.
