= Tall nightshade =

Tall nightshade is a common name for several plants and may refer to:

- Solanum chenopodioides, native to South America
- Solanum furcatum, native to South America
- Solanum nigrescens
