= Solanum perlongistylum =

Scientific classification
- Kingdom: Plantae
- Clade: Tracheophytes
- Clade: Angiosperms
- Clade: Eudicots
- Clade: Asterids
- Order: Solanales
- Family: Solanaceae
- Genus: Solanum
- Species: S. perlongistylum

Binomial name
- Solanum perlongistylum Anderson et al., 2006

Species of plant

Solanum perlongistylum is an evergreen vine in the family Solanaceae. It is endemic to Peru, and is a close relative of S. muricatum, the domesticated pepino. Its style is the longest in the group, and its flowers have a higher pollen:ovule ratio. It is self-incompatible. It is diploid at n = 12. Together with Solanum catilliflorum, it might be an allopatric variant of S. caripense.
