= Anaerolinea thermolimosa =

Scientific classification
- Domain: Bacteria
- Kingdom: Bacillati
- Phylum: Chloroflexota
- Class: Anaerolineae
- Order: Anaerolineales
- Family: Anaerolineaceae
- Genus: Anaerolinea
- Species: A. thermolimosa

Binomial name
- Anaerolinea thermolimosa Yamada et al. 2006

Species of bacterium

Anaerolinea thermolimosa is a thermophilic, non-spore-forming, non-motile, Gram-negative, filamentous bacteria with type strain IMO-1^{T} (=JCM 12577^{T} =DSM 16554^{T}).
