= Thermomarinilinea =

Scientific classification
- Domain: Bacteria
- Kingdom: Bacillati
- Phylum: Chloroflexota
- Class: Anaerolineae
- Order: Anaerolineales
- Family: Anaerolineaceae
- Genus: Thermomarinilinea; Nunoura et al. 2013

Type species
- Thermomarinilinea lacunofontalis corrig. Nunoura et al. 2013

Species
- T. lacunofontalis

Genus of bacteria

Thermomarinilinea is a bacteria genus from the family of Anaerolineaceae with one known species (Thermomarinilinea lacunofontalis).

== See also ==
- List of bacterial orders
- List of bacteria genera
