= Caldilinea =

Scientific classification
- Domain: Bacteria
- Kingdom: Bacillati
- Phylum: Chloroflexota
- Class: Caldilineae
- Order: Caldilineales
- Family: Caldilineaceae
- Genus: Caldilinea; Sekiguchi et al. 2003

Type species
- Caldilinea aerophila Sekiguchi et al. 2003

Species
- C. aerophila; "Ca. C. saccharophila"; C. tarbellica

Genus of bacteria

Caldilinea is a genus of bacteria from the family Caldilineaceae.

== See also ==
- List of bacterial orders
- List of bacteria genera
