= Flexilinea =

Scientific classification
- Domain: Bacteria
- Kingdom: Bacillati
- Phylum: Chloroflexota
- Class: Anaerolineae
- Order: Anaerolineales
- Family: Anaerolineaceae
- Genus: Flexilinea; Sun et al. 2016

Type species
- Flexilinea flocculi Sun et al. 2016

Species
- F. flocculi

Genus of bacteria

Flexilinea is a bacterial genus from the family of Anaerolineaceae with one known species (Flexilinea flocculi). Flexilinea flocculi has been isolated from methanogenic granular sludge.

== See also ==
- List of bacterial orders
- List of bacteria genera
