= Anaerolinea thermophila =

Scientific classification
- Domain: Bacteria
- Kingdom: Bacillati
- Phylum: Chloroflexota
- Class: Anaerolineae
- Order: Anaerolineales
- Family: Anaerolineaceae
- Genus: Anaerolinea
- Species: A. thermophila

Binomial name
- Anaerolinea thermophila Sekiguchi et al. 2003

Species of bacterium

Anaerolinea thermophila is a species of filamentous thermophilic bacteria, the type and only species of its genus. It is Gram-negative, non-spore-forming, with type strain UNI-1^{T} (=JCM 11387^{T} =DSM 14523^{T}).
