= Longilinea =

Scientific classification
- Domain: Bacteria
- Kingdom: Bacillati
- Phylum: Chloroflexota
- Class: Anaerolineae
- Order: Anaerolineales
- Family: Anaerolineaceae
- Genus: Longilinea; Yamada et al. 2007

Type species
- Longilinea arvoryzae Yamada et al. 2007

Species
- L. arvoryzae

Genus of bacteria

Longilinea is a bacteria genus from the family of Anaerolineaceae with one known species (Longilinea arvoryzaes).

== See also ==
- List of bacterial orders
- List of bacteria genera
