= Levilinea =

Scientific classification
- Domain: Bacteria
- Kingdom: Bacillati
- Phylum: Chloroflexota
- Class: Anaerolineae
- Order: Anaerolineales
- Family: Anaerolineaceae
- Genus: Levilinea; Yamada et al. 2006

Type species
- Levilinea saccharolytica Yamada et al. 2006

Species
- L. saccharolytica

Genus of bacteria

Levilinea is a bacteria genus from the family of Anaerolineaceae with one known species (Levilinea saccharolytica).

== See also ==
- List of bacterial orders
- List of bacteria genera
