= Bellilinea =

Scientific classification
- Domain: Bacteria
- Kingdom: Bacillati
- Phylum: Chloroflexota
- Class: Anaerolineae
- Order: Anaerolineales
- Family: Anaerolineaceae
- Genus: Bellilinea; Yamada et al. 2007

Type species
- Bellilinea caldifistulae Yamada et al. 2007

Species
- B. caldifistulae

Genus of bacteria

Bellilinea is a thermophilic bacteria genus from the family of Anaerolineaceae with one known species (Bellilinea caldifistulae). Bellilinea caldifistulae has been isolated from thermophilic digester sludge from Niigata in Japan.

== See also ==
- List of bacterial orders
- List of bacteria genera
