= Brevefilum =

Scientific classification
- Domain: Bacteria
- Kingdom: Bacillati
- Phylum: Chloroflexota
- Class: Anaerolineae
- Order: Anaerolineales
- Family: Anaerolineaceae
- Genus: Brevefilum; McIlroy et al. 2017

Type species
- Brevefilum fermentans corrig. McIlroy et al. 2017

Species
- B. fermentans

Synonyms
- "Ca. Brevifilum" corrig.

Genus of bacteria

Brevefilum is a bacteria genus from the family of Anaerolineaceae with one known species (Brevefilum fermentans).

== See also ==
- List of bacterial orders
- List of bacteria genera
