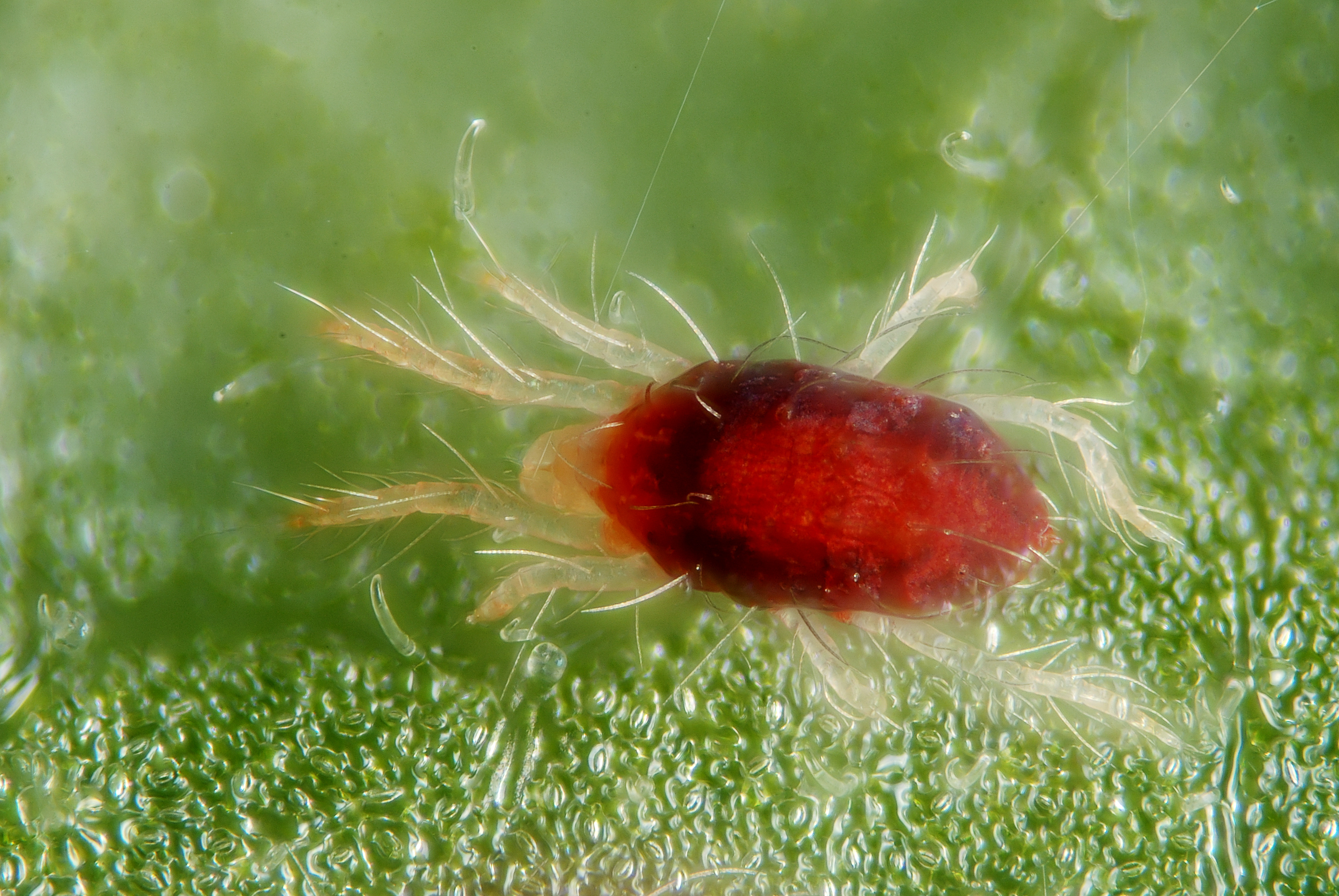
- A red individual
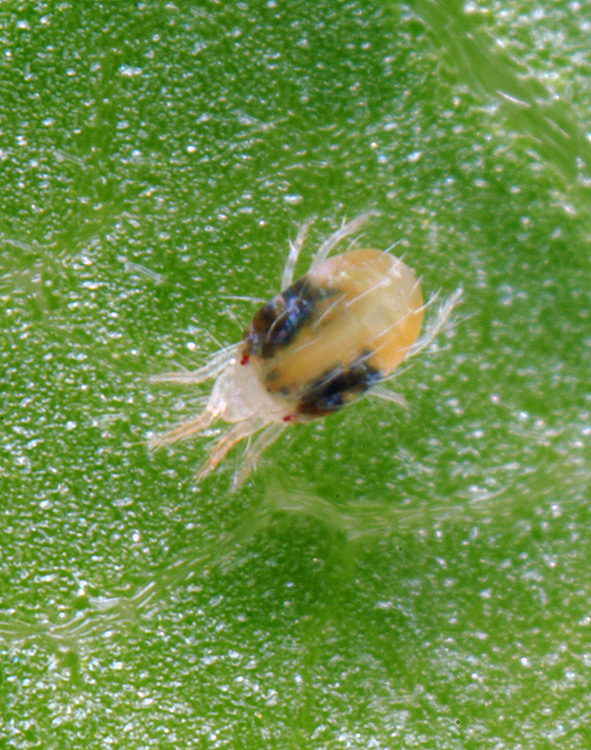
- A yellow individual with two black spots

Scientific classification
- Kingdom: Animalia
- Phylum: Arthropoda
- Subphylum: Chelicerata
- Class: Arachnida
- Order: Trombidiformes
- Family: Tetranychidae
- Genus: Tetranychus
- Species: T. urticae

Binomial name
- Tetranychus urticae C. L. Koch, 1836

= Tetranychus urticae =

Species of mite

Tetranychus urticae (common names include red spider mite and two-spotted spider mite) is a species of plant-feeding mite generally considered to be a pest. It is the most widely known member of the family Tetranychidae or spider mites. Its genome was fully sequenced in 2011, and was the first genome sequence from any chelicerate.

== Distribution ==
T. urticae was originally native only to Eurasia, but has acquired a cosmopolitan distribution as a common pest in a wide range of agricultural systems.

== Description ==
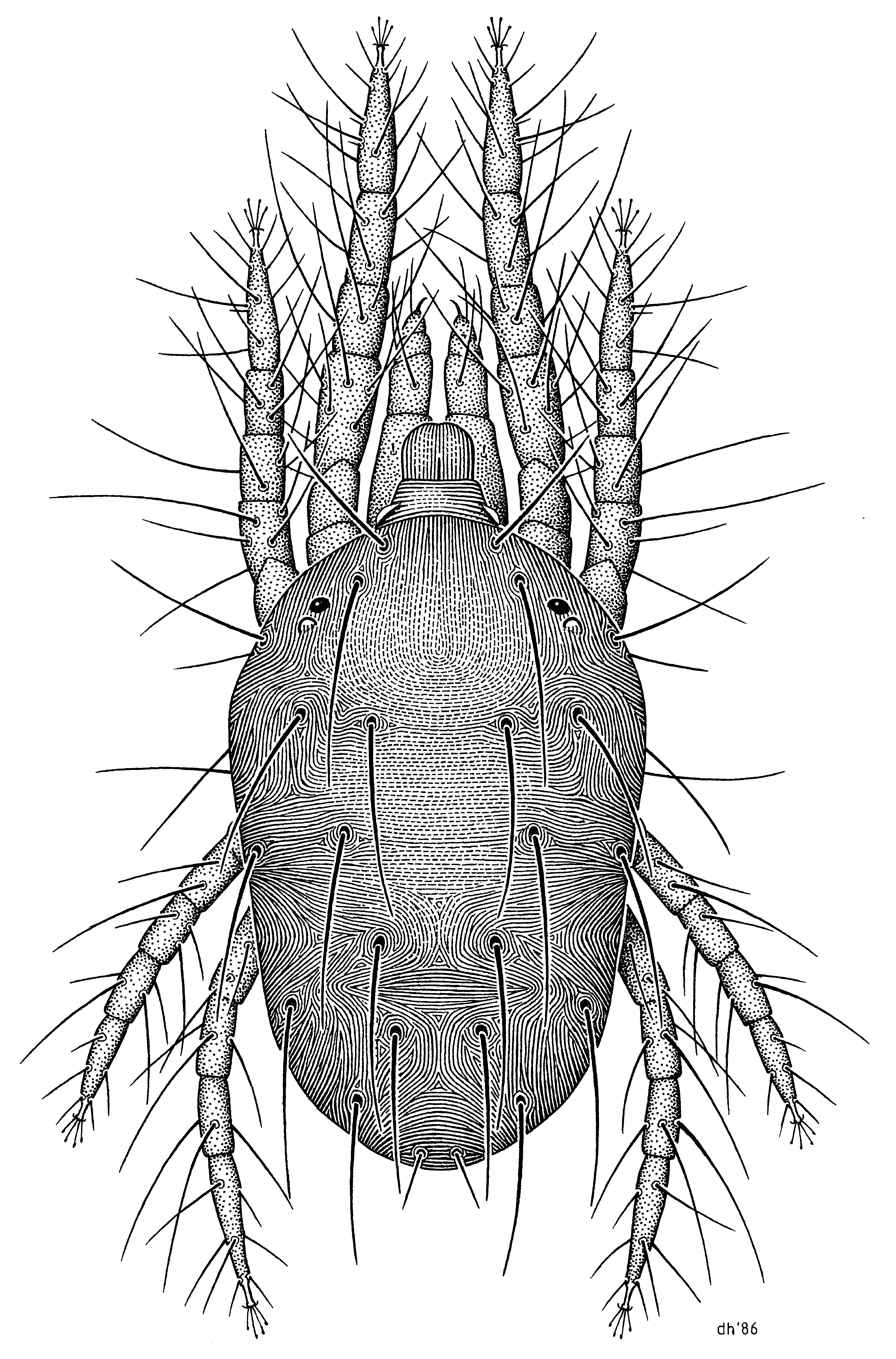
Zoological drawing

T. urticae is extremely small, barely visible with the naked eye as reddish, yellow or black spots on plants; the adult females measure about 0.4 mm (0.016 in) long. Adult mites sometimes spin a fine web on and under leaves.

== Ecology ==
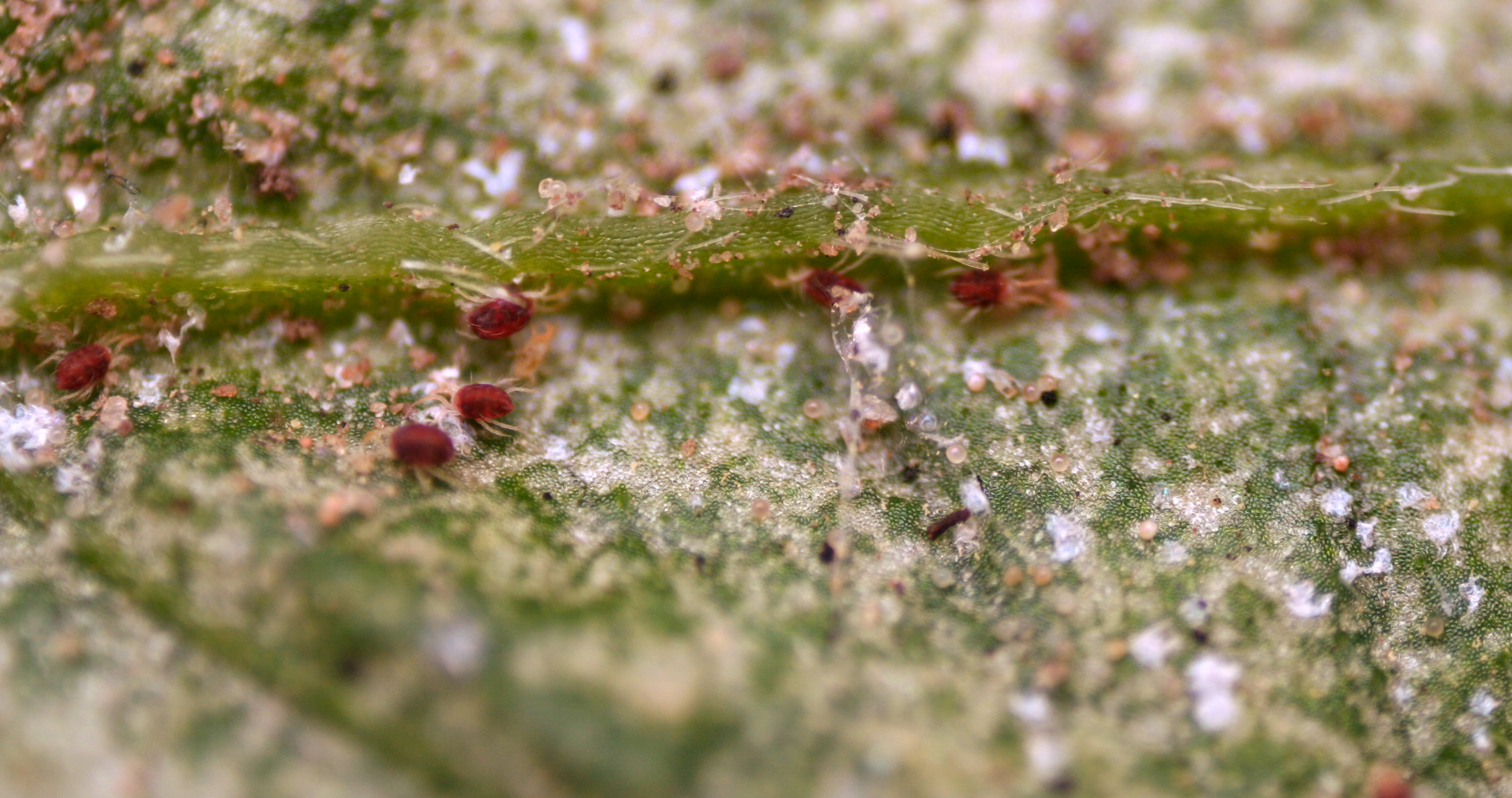
Some T. urticae adults and eggs on the underside of a pepino leaf

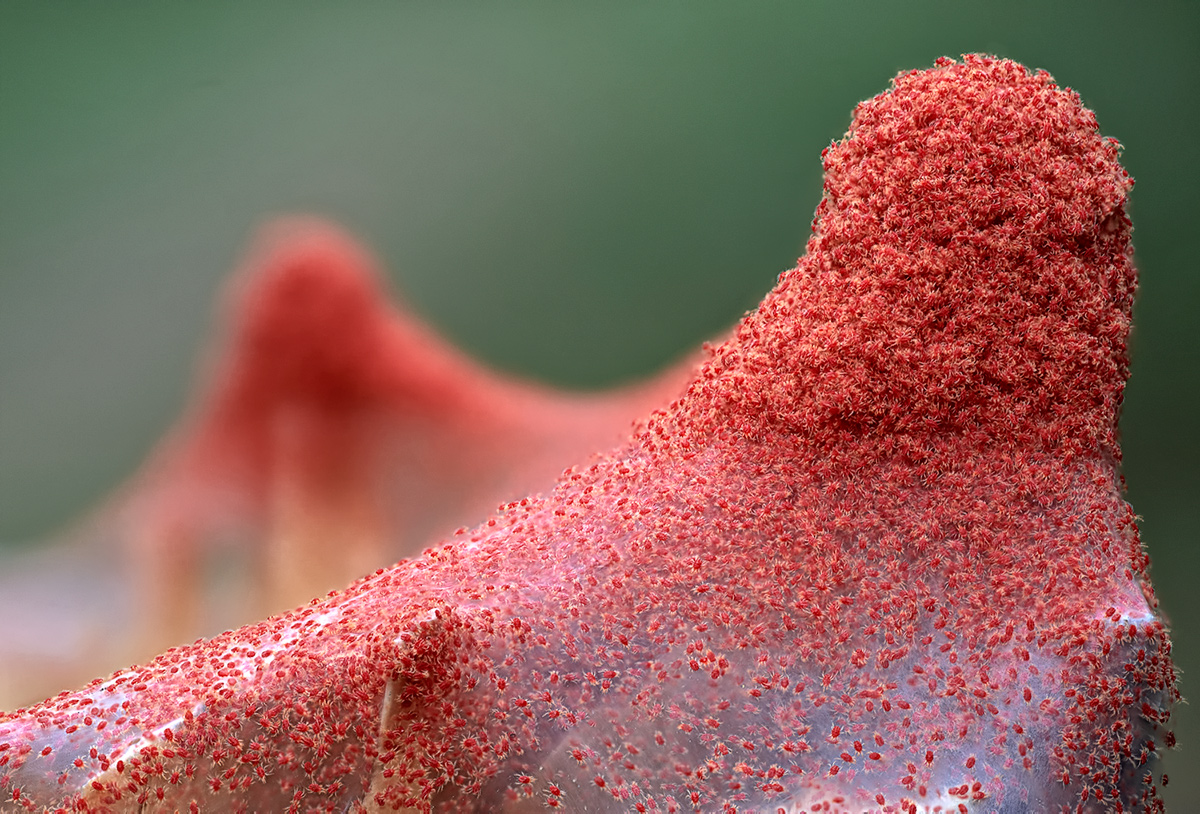
A colony of T. urticae

This spider mite is extremely polyphagous; it can feed on hundreds of plants, including most vegetables and food crops – such as peppers, tomatoes, potatoes, pepinos, beans, maize, and strawberries, and ornamental plants such as roses. It is the most prevalent pest of Withania somnifera in India. It lays its eggs on the leaves, and it poses a threat to host plants by sucking cell contents from the leaves cell by cell, leaving tiny pale spots or scars where the green epidermal cells have been destroyed. Although the individual lesions are very small, attack by hundreds or thousands of spider mites can cause thousands of lesions, thus can significantly reduce the photosynthetic capability of plants. They feed on single cells which are pierced with a stylet-like mouthpart and the cell contents are removed, they do damage to the spongy mesophyll, palisade parenchyma, and chloroplasts.

T. urticae populations may increase rapidly in hot, dry conditions, expanding to 70 times the original population in as few as six days.

The mite's natural predator, Phytoseiulus persimilis, commonly used as a biological control method, is one of many predatory mites which prey mainly or exclusively on spider mites.

T. urticae is among the few animals known to synthesise carotenoids. As in aphids and gall midges, the genes for carotene synthesis appear to have been acquired through horizontal gene transfer from a fungus.

== Lifecycle ==
T. urticae reproduces through arrhenotoky, a form of parthenogenesis in which unfertilized eggs develop into males.

The egg of T. urticae is translucent and pearl-like. It hatches into a larva, and two nymph stages follow: a protonymph, and then a deutonymph, which may display quiescent stages. The adults are typically pale green for most of the year, but later generations are red; mated females survive the winter in diapause.

=== Inbreeding avoidance ===
Inbreeding is detrimental for fitness in T. urticae. Inbred progeny mature more slowly than outbred progeny, and inbred female progeny have lower reproductive output. T. urticae females apparently are capable of kin recognition and have the ability to avoid inbreeding through mate choice.

== Genomics ==
Genomic information
- NCBI ID: 32264
- Ploidy: haploid (males) / diploid (females)
- Genome size: 90.82 Mb
- Year of completion: 2011

The genome of T. urticae was fully sequenced in 2011, and was the first genome sequence from any chelicerate.
