= Ornatilinea =

Scientific classification
- Domain: Bacteria
- Kingdom: Bacillati
- Phylum: Chloroflexota
- Class: Anaerolineae
- Order: Anaerolineales
- Family: Anaerolineaceae
- Genus: Ornatilinea; Podosokorskaya et al. 2013

Type species
- Ornatilinea apprima Podosokorskaya et al. 2013

Species
- O. apprima

Genus of bacteria

Ornatilinea is a bacteria genus from the family of Anaerolineaceae with one known species (Ornatilinea apprima). Ornatilinea apprima has been isolated from microbial mat from an anaerobic sludge blanket reactor from the Tomsk Region in Russia.

== See also ==
- List of bacterial orders
- List of bacteria genera
