= Thermanaerothrix =

Scientific classification
- Domain: Bacteria
- Kingdom: Bacillati
- Phylum: Chloroflexota
- Class: Anaerolineae
- Order: Anaerolineales
- Family: Anaerolineaceae
- Genus: Thermanaerothrix; Grégoire et al. 2011

Type species
- Thermanaerothrix daxensis Gregoire et al. 2011

Species
- T. daxensis

Genus of bacteria

Thermanaerothrix is a bacteria genus from the family of Anaerolineaceae with one known species (Thermanaerothrix daxensis). Thermanaerothrix daxensis has been isolated from water from the Saint-Christophe spring in France.

== See also ==
- List of bacterial orders
- List of bacteria genera
