= Pelolinea =

Scientific classification
- Domain: Bacteria
- Kingdom: Bacillati
- Phylum: Chloroflexota
- Class: Anaerolineae
- Order: Anaerolineales
- Family: Anaerolineaceae
- Genus: Pelolinea; Imachi et al. 2014

Type species
- Pelolinea submarina Imachi et al. 2014

Species
- P. submarina

Genus of bacteria

Pelolinea is a bacteria genus from the family of Anaerolineaceae with one known species (Pelolinea submarina). Pelolinea submarina has been isolated from marine sediments from the Shimokita Peninsula.

== See also ==
- List of bacterial orders
- List of bacteria genera
