= Anaerolinea =

Scientific classification
- Domain: Bacteria
- Kingdom: Bacillati
- Phylum: Chloroflexota
- Class: Anaerolineae
- Order: Anaerolineales
- Family: Anaerolineaceae
- Genus: Anaerolinea; Sekiguchi et al. 2003

Type species
- Anaerolinea thermophila Sekiguchi et al. 2003

Species
- A. thermolimosa; A. thermophila

Genus of bacteria

Anaerolinea is a bacterial genus from the family of Anaerolineaceae.

== See also ==
- List of bacterial orders
- List of bacteria genera
