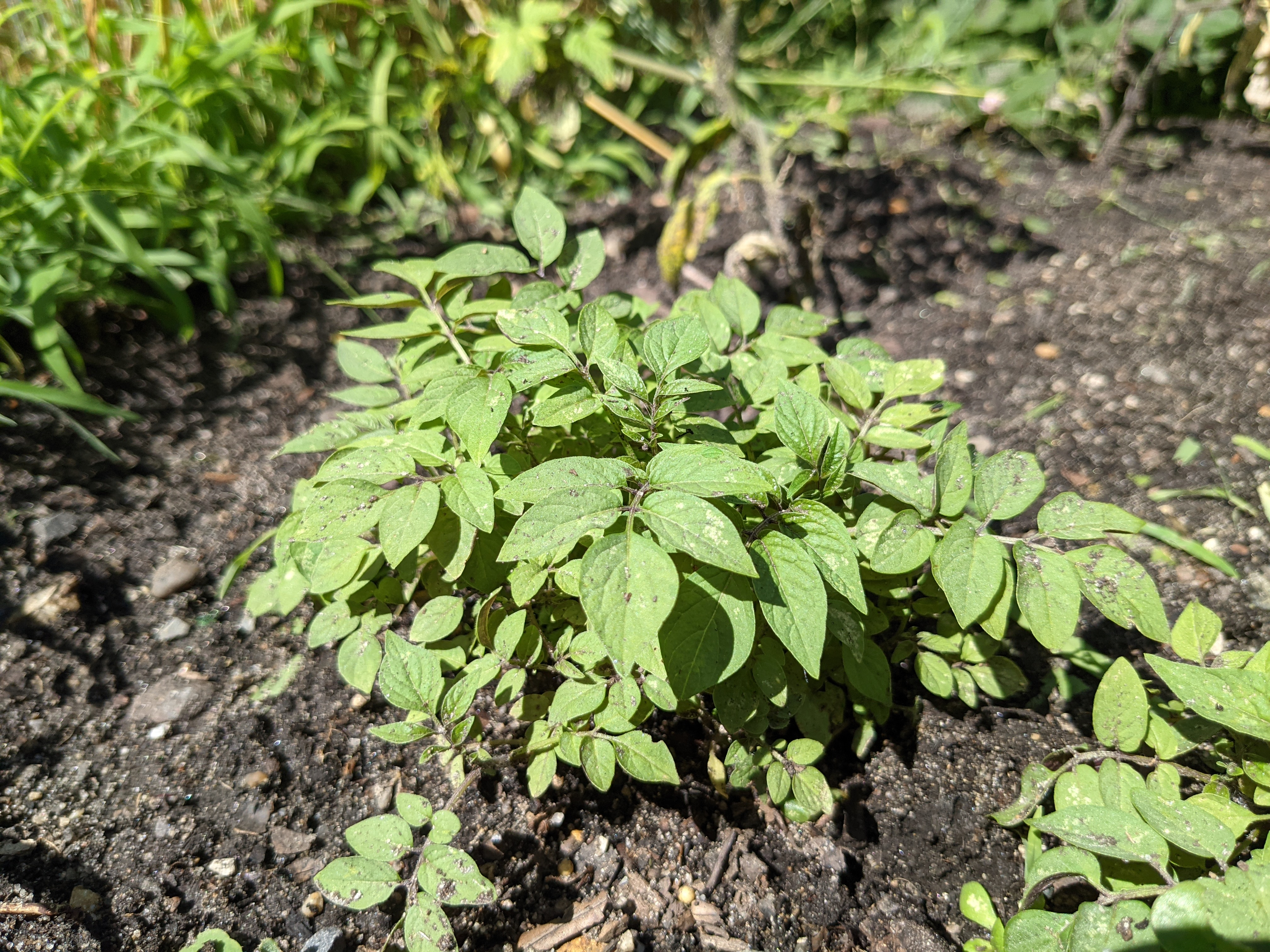
- A domesticated specimen of Solanum caripense in the early stages of growth.

Scientific classification
- Kingdom: Plantae
- Clade: Tracheophytes
- Clade: Angiosperms
- Clade: Eudicots
- Clade: Asterids
- Order: Solanales
- Family: Solanaceae
- Genus: Solanum
- Species: S. caripense

Binomial name
- Solanum caripense Dunal

= Solanum caripense =

Species of plant

Solanum caripense is a species of evergreen shrub native to South America and grown for its edible fruit.

Rare in cultivation, it is known as tzimbalo. The fruit closely resembles the related pepino (Solanum muricatum), and it has been speculated that Solanum caripense may be the wild ancestor of the pepino. Like the pepino, the tzimbalo is a relative of other nightshades cultivated for their edible fruit, including the tomato (S. lycopersicum), the naranjilla (S. quitoense) and the eggplant (S. melongena). Solanum caripense is part of the Basarthrum clade within the broader Potato clade.

The fruit is infrequently cultivated in its native range of Colombia, Ecuador, Bolivia, Peru and Chile but has been rediscovered on a small scale by heirloom gardeners elsewhere in the world.

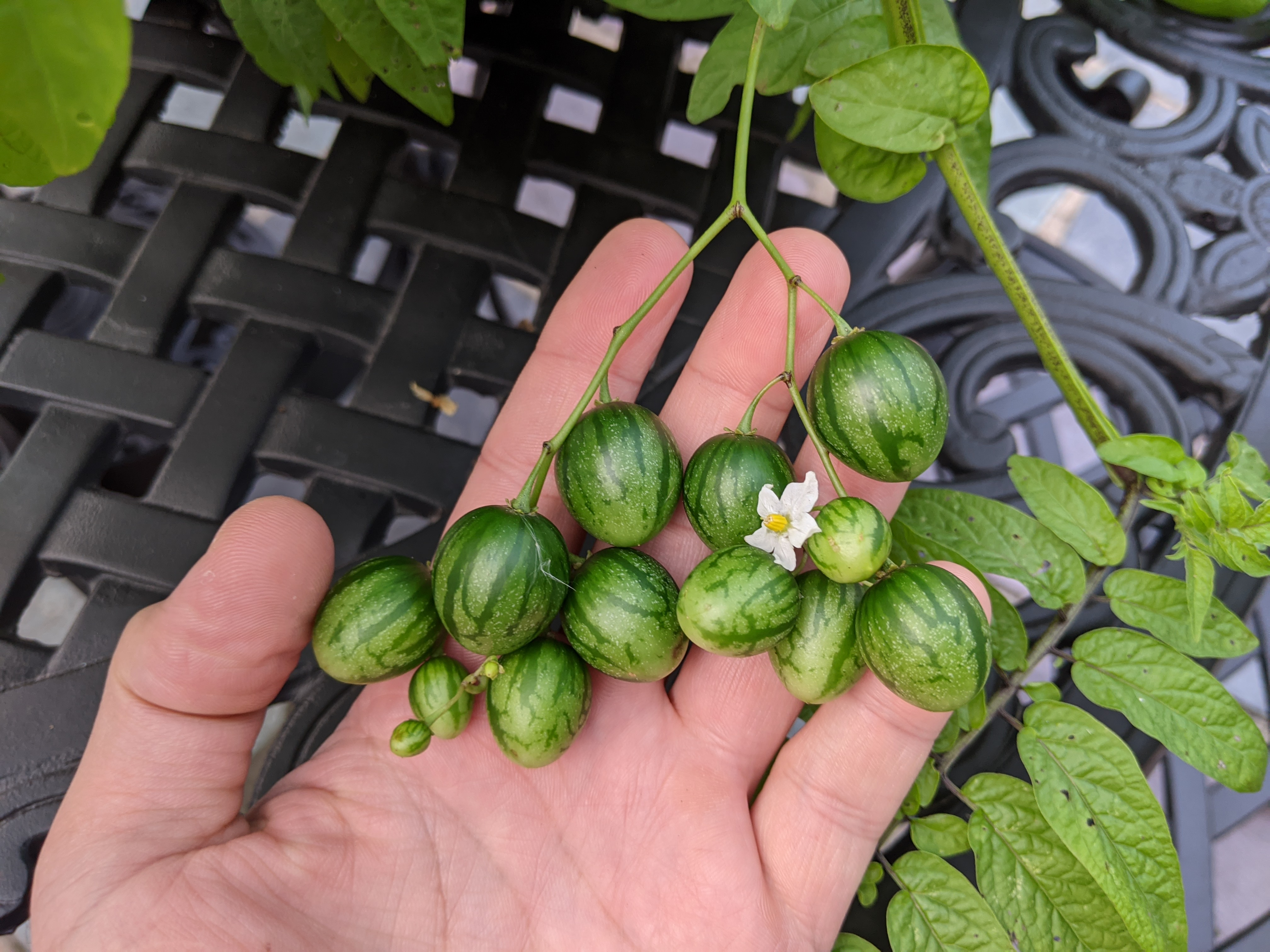
A flower and the fruit of S. caripense

== Distribution and habitat ==
The tzimbalo is presumed to be native to the temperate Andean regions of Colombia, Ecuador, Peru and Chile. Like the pepino, the tzimbalo can bear fruit within 1 or 2 years from seed. The fruits are round berries, to 2 cm in size, which ripen to yellow or pale green, with dark-colored longitudinal stripes. The flavor and texture, while similar to the pepino, tends to be tangier and more juicy.

Like the pepino, the tzimbalo performs best in a warm, relatively frost-free climates. The plant can survive a low temperature of -2.5 °C (27 to 28 °F) if the freeze is very short, though it may drop many of its leaves. Like its close relatives, the species is a perennial, but its sensitivity to chilling, pests, and diseases, along with its relatively long growing season serve as hindrances to large scale commercial exploitation. The tzimbalo does adapt well to greenhouse cultivation.

Like most edible nightshades, the tzimbalo is highly attractive to pests like aphids, white flies, beetles, and spider mites.
