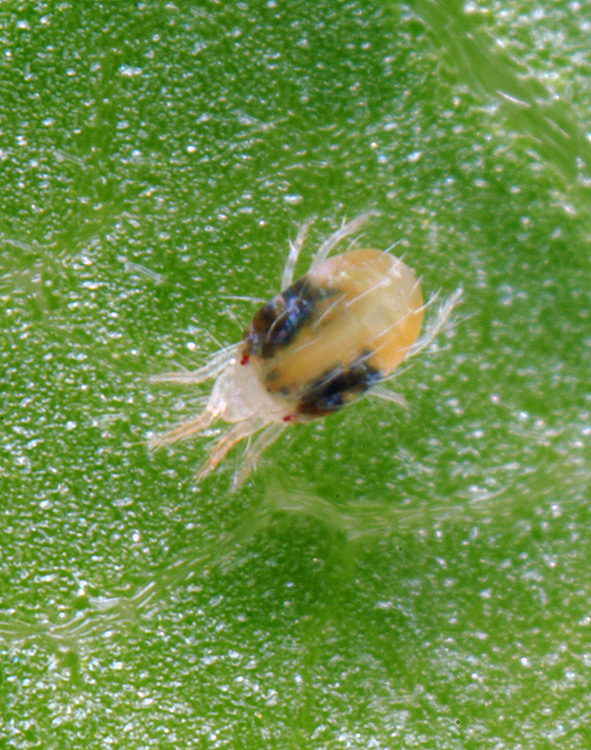
- Tetranychus urticae

Scientific classification
- Kingdom: Animalia
- Phylum: Arthropoda
- Subphylum: Chelicerata
- Class: Arachnida
- Order: Trombidiformes
- Family: Tetranychidae
- Subfamily: Tetranychinae
- Genus: Tetranychus; Dufour, 1832

= Tetranychus =

Genus of mites

Tetranychus is a genus of spider mite. Tetranychus is one of the most economically important genera of mites, due to its high potential to destroy agriculture. It contains 159 described species, the most significant of which is Tetranychus urticae.

== Selected species ==
- Tetranychus abacae - Ácaro-da-bananeira
- Tetranychus lintearius
- Tetranychus pacificus
- Tetranychus urticae
