= Caldilinea aerophila =

Scientific classification
- Domain: Bacteria
- Kingdom: Bacillati
- Phylum: Chloroflexota
- Class: Caldilineae
- Order: Caldilineales
- Family: Caldilineaceae
- Genus: Caldilinea
- Species: C. aerophila

Binomial name
- Caldilinea aerophila Sekiguchi et al. 2003

Species of bacterium

Caldilinea aerophila is a species of filamentous thermophilic bacteria, and the type species of its genus. It is Gram-negative, non-spore-forming, with type strain STL-6-O1^{T} (=JCM 11388^{T} =DSM 14525^{T}).
