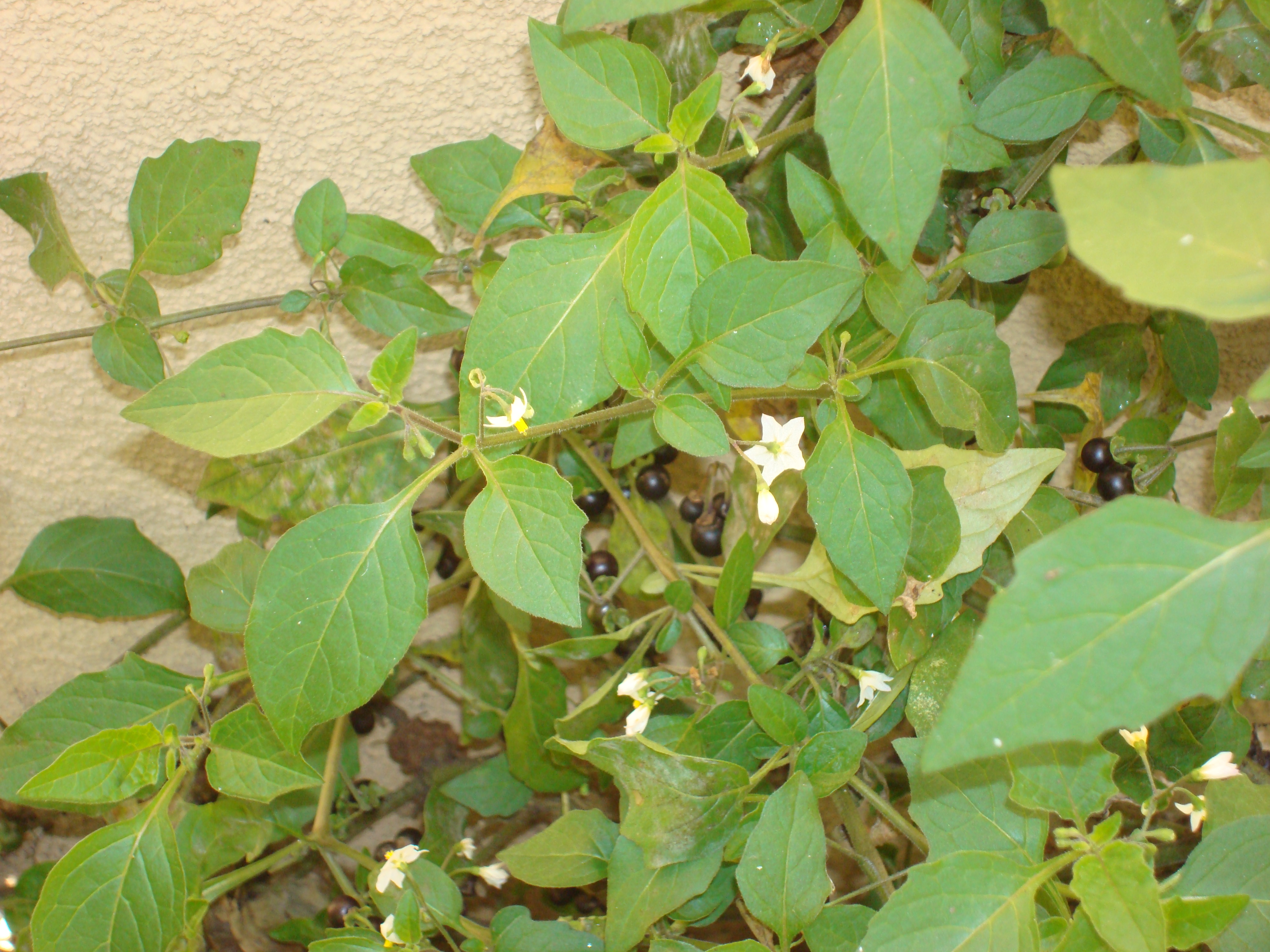

Scientific classification
- Kingdom: Plantae
- Clade: Tracheophytes
- Clade: Angiosperms
- Clade: Eudicots
- Clade: Asterids
- Order: Solanales
- Family: Solanaceae
- Genus: Solanum
- Species: S. furcatum

Binomial name
- Solanum furcatum Dunal ex Poir.

= Solanum furcatum =

Species of flowering plant

Solanum furcatum is a species of plant in the family Solanaceae known by the common name forked nightshade. It is native to South America. It is known elsewhere as an introduced species.
