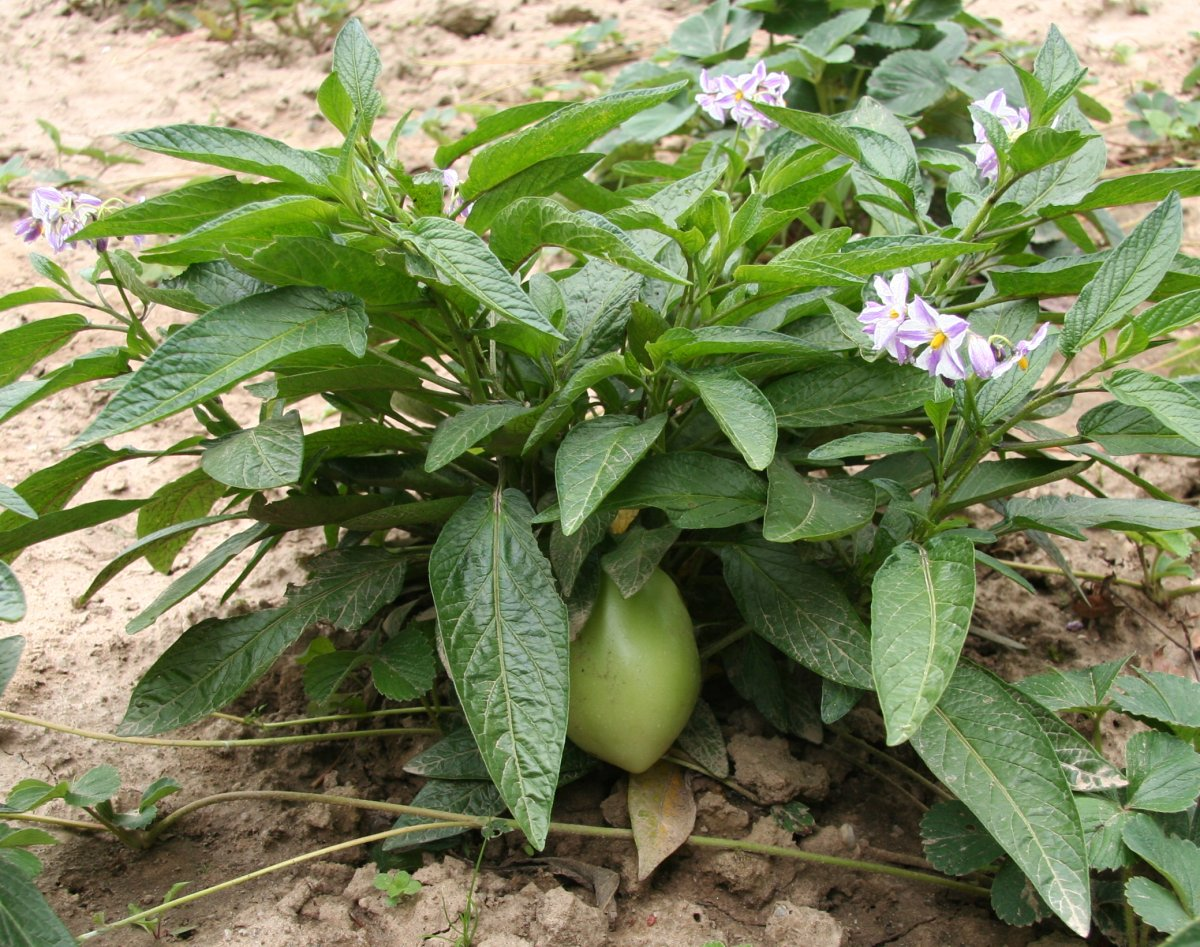
- Plant with flowers and ripening fruit

Scientific classification
- Kingdom: Plantae
- Clade: Tracheophytes
- Clade: Angiosperms
- Clade: Eudicots
- Clade: Asterids
- Order: Solanales
- Family: Solanaceae
- Genus: Solanum
- Species: S. muricatum

Binomial name
- Solanum muricatum Aiton

Synonyms
- List: Solanum guatemalense Hort.; Solanum hebephorum Dunal; Solanum longifolium Sessé & Moc.; Solanum melaniferum Moric. ex Dunal; Solanum pedunculatum Roem. & Schult.; Solanum saccianum Naudin; Solanum saccianum Carrière & André; Solanum scabrum Lam.; Solanum variegatum Ruiz & Pav.; Solanum wallisii Carrière; Solanum muricatum var. dissectum Dunal; Solanum muricatum f. glaberrimum Correll; Solanum muricatum var. papillosistylum Bitter; Solanum muricatum var. parvifolium Kunth; Solanum muricatum var. popayanum Bitter; Solanum muricatum var. praecedens Bitter; Solanum muricatum var. protogenum Bitter; Solanum muricatum var. teleutogenum Bitter

= Solanum muricatum =

Species of plant

Solanum muricatum is a South American species of evergreen shrub grown for its sweet edible fruit.

It is known by the Spanish common names of pepino or pepino dulce ('sweet cucumber', differentiating it from cucumber, which is also called pepino). It is also sometimes called pepino melon or melon pear due to its flavor. Another common name, tree melon, is more often used for the papaya.

== Description ==
The fruit resembles a melon (Cucumis melo) in color, and its flavor recalls a succulent mixture of honeydew and cucumber.

The species is a close relative of other nightshades cultivated for their fruit, including the tomato (S. lycopersicum) and the eggplant/aubergine (S. melongena), which its own fruit closely resembles.

== Taxonomy ==
The species was described in 1789 by 18th-century Scottish botanist William Aiton.

Solanum furcatum was also called Solanum muricatum by Bertero based on 19th-century French botanist Michel Félix Dunal.

== Distribution and habitat ==
The pepino dulce is presumed to be native to the temperate Andean regions of Colombia, Peru, and Chile, though it is not known in the wild and the details of its domestication are unknown.

== Cultivation ==
Pepinos were described by early Spanish colonizers as being cultivated on the coast; the Moche Valley in Peru was particularly famous for them. They are not, however, often found archaeologically as they are soft and pulpy and not easy to preserve, while their tough seeds are small and easily lost among debris.

In the United States, the fruit is known to have been grown in San Diego before 1889 and in Santa Barbara by 1897. More commercially viable cultivars were introduced from New Zealand and elsewhere towards the end of the 20th century, leading to its introduction into upscale markets in Japan, Europe and North America.

The plant is relatively hardy. In its native range it grows at altitudes ranging from close to sea level up to 3,000 metres (9,800 feet). It performs best in a warm, relatively frost-free climate. The plant can survive a low temperature of −2.5 °C (27.5 °F) if the freeze is not prolonged, but it may drop many of its leaves. The species is perennial, but its sensitivity to chilling, pests, and diseases force the growers to replant the crop every year. The crop also adapts well to greenhouse cultivation, training the plants up to 2 m (6 1/2 ft) tall, and obtaining yields that are 2–3 times larger than those obtained outdoors.

They are propagated by cuttings since they are established easily without rooting hormones. It is grown in a manner similar to its relatives such as the tomato, though it grows naturally upright by habit and can thus be cultivated as a free-standing bush, though it is sometimes pruned on. Additionally, supports are sometimes used to keep the weight of the fruit from pulling the plant down. It has a fast growth rate and bears fruit within 4 to 6 months after planting. It is a perennial, but is usually cultivated as an annual. Seedlings are intolerant of weeds, but it can later easily compete with low growing weeds. Like their relatives tomatoes, eggplants, tomatillos and tamarillos, pepinos are extremely attractive to beetles, aphids, white flies, and spider mites. Pepinos are tolerant of most soil, but require constant moisture for good fruit production. Established bushes show some tolerance to drought stress, but this typically affects yield. The plants are parthenocarpic, meaning it needs no pollination to set fruit, though pollination will encourage fruiting.

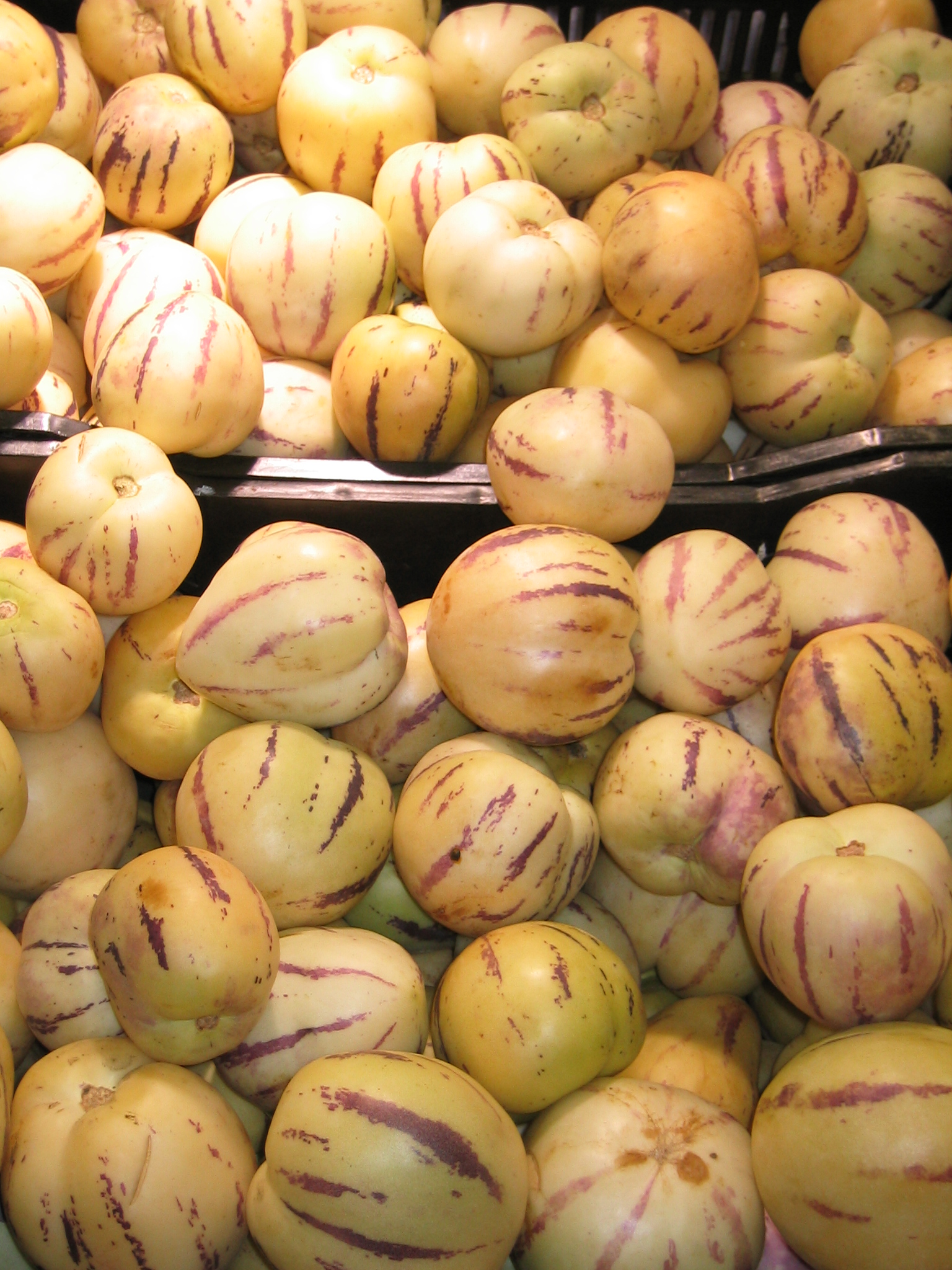
Main commercial variety of S. muricatum at a market in Lima, Peru

The plant is grown primarily in Chile, New Zealand, and Western Australia. In Chile, more than 400 hectares are planted in the Longotoma Valley with an increasing proportion of the harvest being exported. Colombia, Peru, and Ecuador also grow the plant, but on a more local scale. Outside of the Andean region, it has been grown in various countries of Central America, Morocco, Spain, Israel, and the highlands of Kenya. In the US, several hundred hectares of the fruit are grown on a small scale in Hawaii and California. More commercially viable cultivars have been introduced from New Zealand and elsewhere in more recent times. As a result, the fruit has been introduced into Japan, Europe, and North America and it is slowly becoming less obscure outside of South America.

Attempts to produce commercial cultivars and to export the fruit have been made in New Zealand, Turkey, Mauritius, and Chile.

The study of the molecular variation of this pepino is of interest for several reasons. Although the seeds of pepino plants are fertile and produce vigorous offspring, this crop is primarily propagated by cuttings, and as a consequence, its genetic structure could be different from that of seed-propagated crops.

== Uses ==
Delicate and mild-flavored, pepinos are often eaten as a fresh snack fruit. They combine very well with a number of other fruits as well.

== In culture ==
Pepinos are a popular decorative motif in Moche art.

== Gallery ==
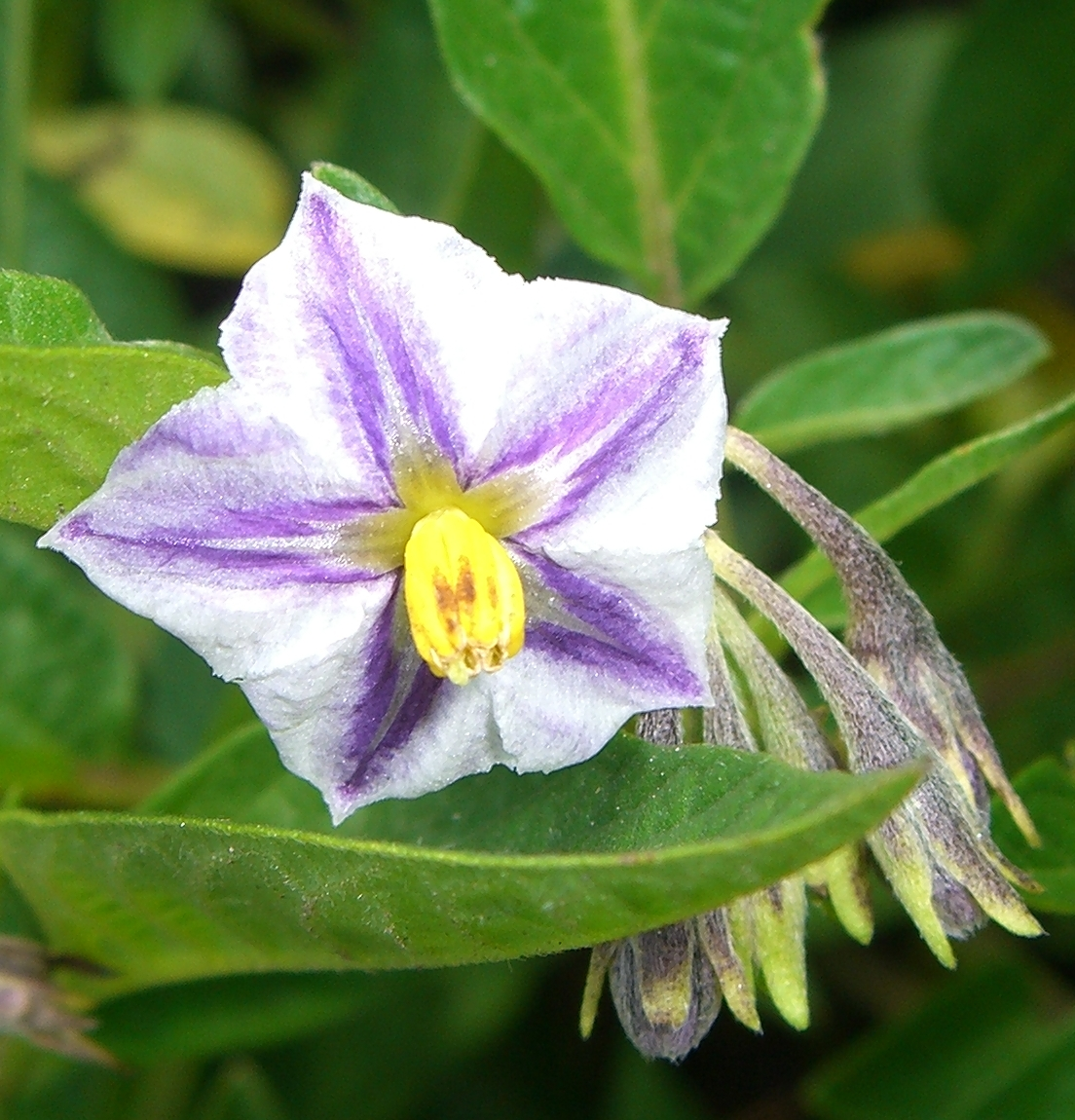
Flower and flower buds

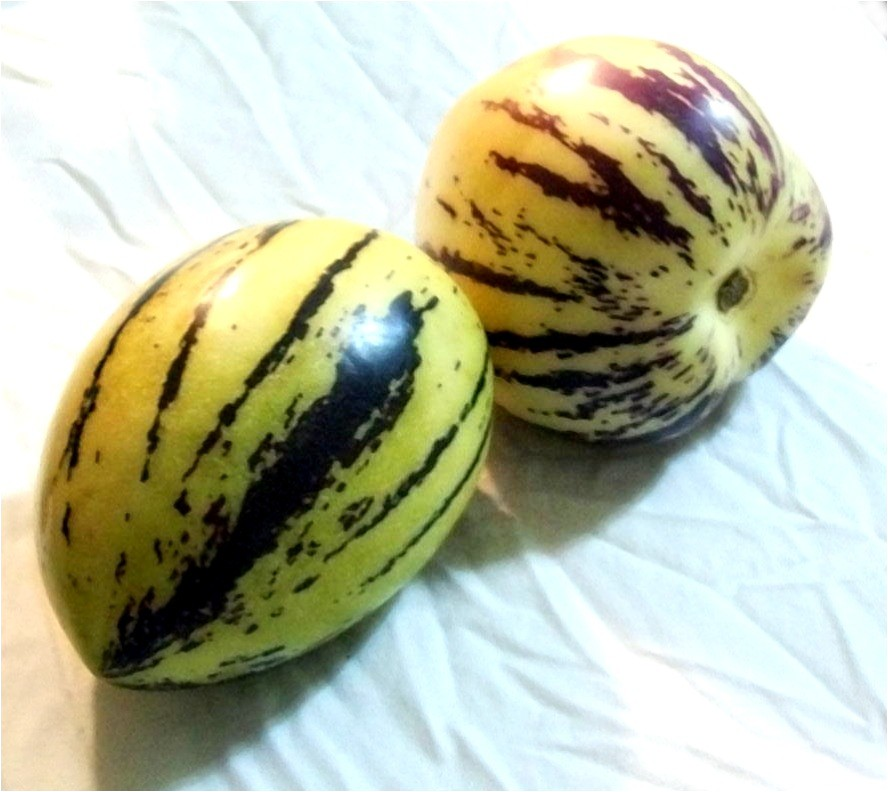
Ripe fruits

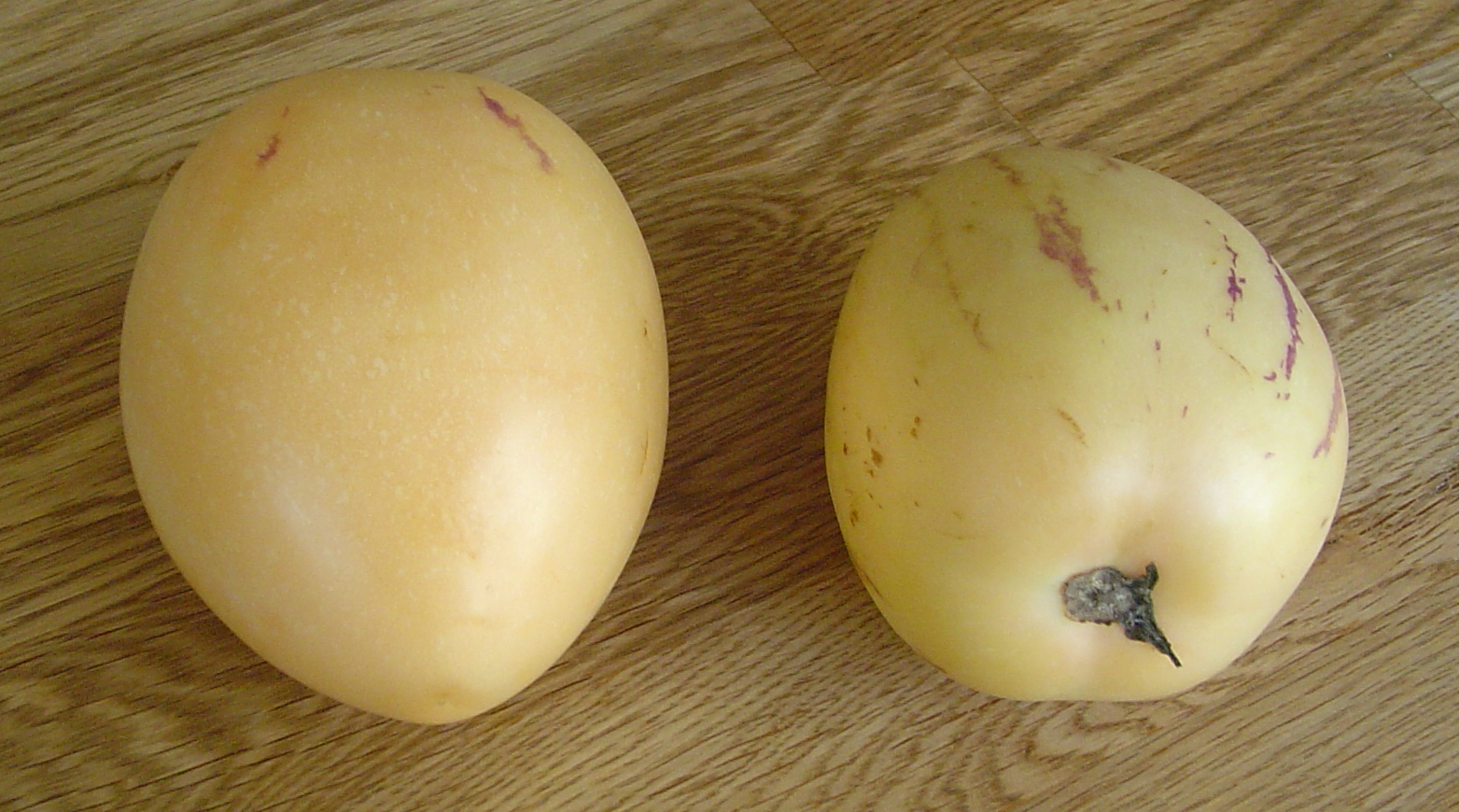
Distal (left) and proximal ends

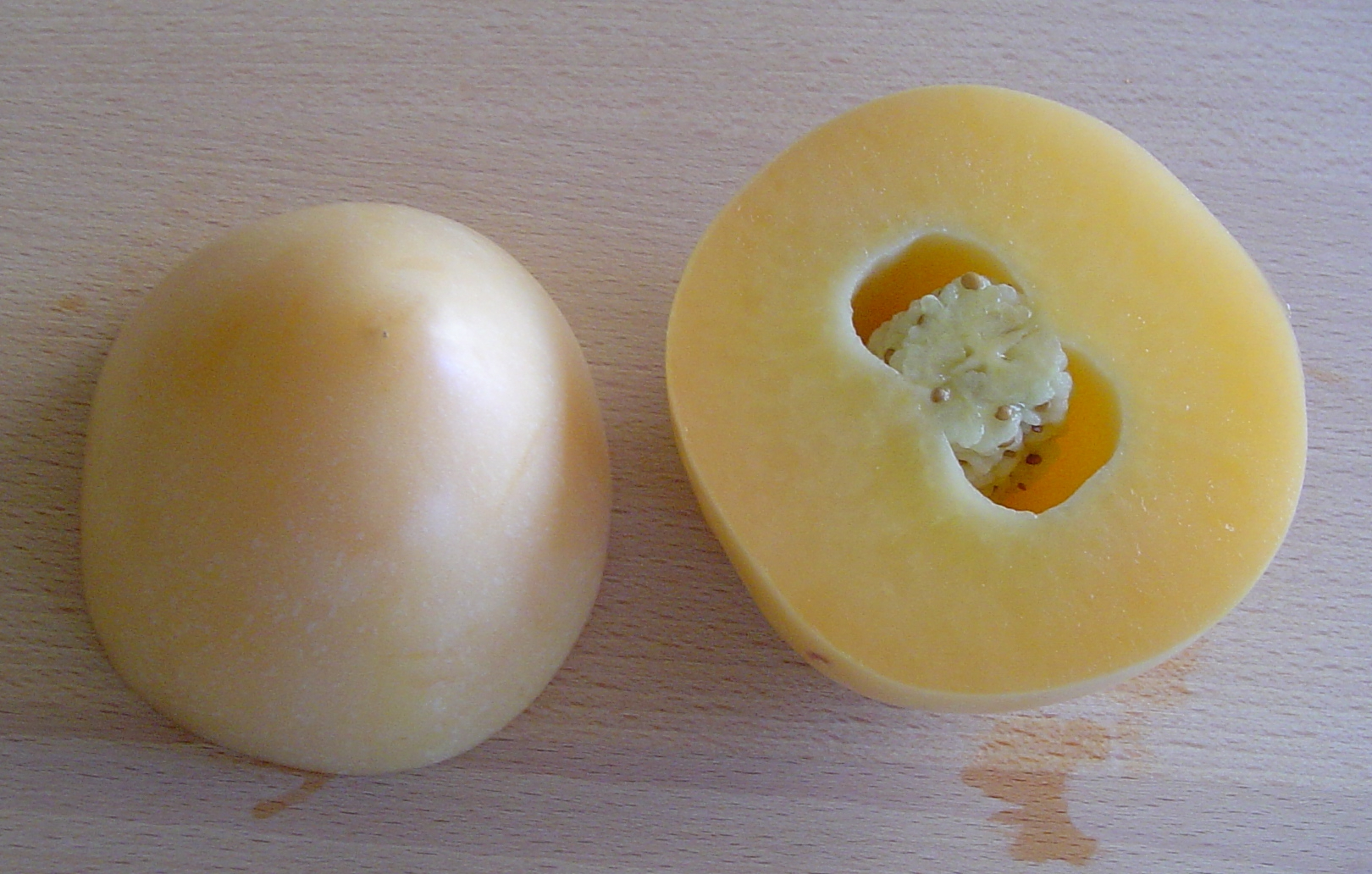
Cut in half

Cut in half

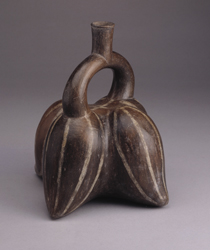
Moche ceramic pepinos
