= Anaerolineaceae =

Scientific classification
- Domain: Bacteria
- Kingdom: Bacillati
- Phylum: Chloroflexota
- Class: Anaerolineae
- Order: Anaerolineales
- Family: Anaerolineaceae; Yamada et al. 2006

Genera
- Anaerolinea; Bellilinea; "Ca. Brevifilum"; Flexilinea; Leptolinea; Levilinea; Longilinea; "Ca. Mesolinea"; Ornatilinea; "Ca. Pachofilum"; Pelolinea; Thermanaerothrix; Thermomarinilinea; "Ca. Tricholinea"

Family of bacteria

Anaerolineaceae is a family of bacteria in the order Anaerolineales. Anaerolineaceae bacteria occur in marine sediments. There are a total of twelve genera in this family, most of which only encompass one species. All known members of the family are Gram-negative and non-motile. They also do not form bacterial spores and are either mesophilic or thermophilic obligate anaerobes. It is also known that all species in this family are chemoheterotrophs.

== History ==
The first species discovered in the family Anaerolineaceae was the species Anaerolinea thermophila, with a report on the matter written by Yuji Sekiguchi et al. in 2003. It was isolated alongside the bacterial species Caldilinea aerophila, a facultative anaerobe. The discovery of these two specimens prompted the addition of a new subphylum in bacterial taxonomy.

== Phylogeny ==
The currently accepted taxonomy is based on the List of Prokaryotic names with Standing in Nomenclature (LPSN) and National Center for Biotechnology Information (NCBI).

16S rRNA based LTP_10_2024

- - Anaerolineaceae
    - Thermomarinilinea Nunoura et al. 2013
    - - Flexilinea
      - - Ornatilinea
        - - Pelolinea
          - - Anaerolinea
            - - Leptolinea
              - - Levilinea
                - - Bellilinea
                  - Longilinea

120 marker proteins based GTDB release 10-RS226

- Anaerolineaceae
  - - Flexilinea Sun et al. 2016
    - - Pelolinea Imachi et al. 2014
      - - "Ca. Brevifilum" corrig. McIlroy et al. 2017
        - "Ca. Mesolinea" Bedoya-Urrego & Alzate 2024
  - - Ornatilinea Podosokorskaya et al. 2013
    - - Levilinea Yamada et al. 2006
      - - Leptolinea Yamada et al. 2006
        - - Anaerolinea Sekiguchi et al. 2003
          - - Longilinea Yamada et al. 2007
            - - Bellilinea Yamada et al. 2007
              - "Thermanaerothrix" Gregoire et al. 2011

== See also ==
- List of bacterial orders
- List of bacteria genera
