= List of restriction enzyme cutting sites: G–K =

Legend of nucleobases
Code	Nucleotide represented
A	Adenine (A)
C	Cytosine (C)
G	Guanine (G)
T	Thymine (T)
N	A, C, G or T
M	A or C
R	A or G
W	A or T
Y	C or T
S	C or G
K	G or T
H	A, C or T
B	C, G or T
V	A, C or G
D	A, G or T

This article contains a list of the most studied restriction enzymes whose names start with G to K inclusive. It contains approximately 90 enzymes.

The following information is given:

- Enzyme: Accepted name of the molecule, according to the internationally adopted nomenclature, and bibliographical references. (Further reading: see the section "Nomenclature" in the article "Restriction enzyme".)
- PDB code: Code used to identify the structure of a protein in the PDB database of protein structures. The 3D atomic structure of a protein provides highly valuable information to understand the intimate details of its mechanism of action.
- Source: Organism that naturally produces the enzyme.
- Recognition sequence: Sequence of DNA recognized by the enzyme and to which it specifically binds.
- Cut: Cutting site and DNA products of the cut. The recognition sequence and the cutting site usually match, but sometimes the cutting site can be dozens of nucleotides away from the recognition site.
- Isoschizomers and neoschizomers: An isoschizomer is an enzyme that recognizes the same sequence as another. A neoschizomer is a special type of isoschizomer that recognizes the same sequence as another, but cuts in a different manner. A maximum number of 8-10 most common isoschizomers are indicated for every enzyme but there may be many more. Neoschizomers are shown in bold and green color font (e.g.: **BamHI**). When "None on date" is indicated, that means that there were no registered isoschizomers in the databases on that date with a clearly defined cutting site. Isoschizomers indicated in white font and grey background correspond to enzymes not listed in the current lists:

as in this not listed enzyme:	EcoR70I

== Restriction enzymes ==
=== G ===
**Enzyme**	**PDB code**	Source	**Recognition sequence**	**Cut**	**Isoschizomers**
GalI		Gluconobacter albidus	5' CCGCGG; 3' GGCGCC	5' ---CCGC GG--- 3'; 3' ---GG CGCC--- 5'
GceI		Gluconobacter cerinus	5' CCGCGG; 3' GGCGCC	5' ---CCGC GG--- 3'; 3' ---GG CGCC--- 5'
GceGLI		Gluconobacter cerinus	5' CCGCGG; 3' GGCGCC	5' ---CCGC GG--- 3'; 3' ---GG CGCC--- 5'
GdiI		Gluconobacter dioxyacetonicus	5' AGGCCT; 3' TCCGGA	5' ---AGG CCT--- 3'; 3' ---TCC GGA--- 5'	AatI, AspMI, Eco147I, PceI, SarI, Sru30DI, SseBI, SteI, StuI
GdiII		Gluconobacter dioxyacetonicus	5' CGGCCR; 3' GCCGGY	5' ---C GGCCR--- 3'; 3' ---GCCGG Y--- 5'
GstI		Geobacillus stearothermophilus	5' GGATCC; 3' CCTAGG	5' ---G GATCC--- 3'; 3' ---CCTAG G--- 5'
GsuI		Gluconobacter suboxydans H-15T	5' CTGGAG; 3' GACCTC	5' ---CTGGAGN_{12}NNNN --- 3'; 3' ---GACCTCN_{12}NN NN--- 5'

=== H ===
**Enzyme**	**PDB code**	Source	**Recognition sequence**	**Cut**	**Isoschizomers**
HacI		Halococcus acetoinfaciens	5' GATC; 3' CTAG	5' --- GATC--- 3'; 3' ---CTAG --- 5'	Bme12I, Bsp67I, BstENII, CcyI, FnuEI, MgoI, NphI, Sau3AI
HaeI		Haemophilus aegyptius	5' WGGCCW; 3' WCCGGW	5' ---WGG CCW--- 3'; 3' ---WCC GGW--- 5'
HaeII		Haemophilus aegypticus	5' RGCGCY; 3' YCGCGR	5' ---RGCGC Y--- 3'; 3' ---Y CGCGR--- 5'	AccB2I, / BfoI, / **Bme142I**, Bsp143II, BstH2I, **LpnI**
HaeIII		Haemophilus aegypticus	5' GGCC; 3' CCGG	5' ---GG CC--- 3'; 3' ---CC GG--- 5'	BsuRI
HaeIV		Haemophilus aegyptius	5' GAYN_{5}RTC; 3' CTRN_{5}YAG	5' ---GAYN_{5}RTCN_{8}NNNNNN --- 3'; 3' ---CTRN_{5}YAGN_{8}N NNNNN--- 5'
HalI		Hafnia alvei B6	5' GAATTC; 3' CTTAAG	5' ---G AATTC--- 3'; 3' ---CTTAA G--- 5'
HalII		Hafnia alvei B6	5' CTGCAG; 3' GACGTC	5' ---CTGCA G--- 3'; 3' ---G ACGTC--- 5'	AjoI, AliAJI, Bsp63I, CfrA4I, CfuII, CstI, PstI, SflI, Srl5DI, Sst12I
HapII		Haemophilus aphrophilus	5' CCGG; 3' GGCC	5' ---C CGG--- 3'; 3' ---GGC C--- 5'
HgaI		Haemophilus gallinarum	5' GACGC; 3' CTGCG	5' ---GACGCN_{4}N NNNNN--- 3'; 3' ---CTGCGN_{4}NNNNNN --- 5'
HgiI		Herpetosiphon giganteus 3303	5' GRCGYC; 3' CYGCRG	5' ---GR CGYC--- 3'; 3' ---CYGC RG--- 5'	AcyI, AsuIII, BbiII, BstACI, HgiGI, HgiHII, Hin1I, PamII
HgiAI		Herpetosiphon giganteus HP1023	5' GWGCWC; 3' CWCGWG	5' ---GWGCW C--- 3'; 3' ---C WCGWG--- 5'	Alw21I, AspHI, Bsh45I, BsiHKAI, Bsm6I, HpyF46II, / MspV281I
HgiBI		Herpetosiphon giganteus Hpg5	5' GGWCC; 3' CCWGG	5' ---G GWCC--- 3'; 3' ---CCWG G--- 5'	Bme18I, BthAI, DsaIV, ErpI, FspMSI, HgiEI, **Psp03I**, **VpaK11AI**
HgiCI		Herpetosiphon giganteus Hpg9	5' GGYRCC; 3' CCRYGG	5' ---G GYRCC--- 3'; 3' ---CCRYG G--- 5'	AccB1I, BanI, BspT107I, BshNI, Eco64I, HgiHI, MspB4I, PfaAI
HgiCII		Herpetosiphon giganteus Hpg9	5' GGWCC; 3' CCWGG	5' ---G GWCC--- 3'; 3' ---CCWG G--- 5'	Bme18I, BthAI, DsaIV, FspMSI, HgiHIII, **Psp03I**, **VpaK11AI**
HgiCIII		Herpetosiphon giganteus Hpg9	5' GTCGAC; 3' CAGCTG	5' ---G TCGAC--- 3'; 3' ---CAGCT G--- 5'
HgiDI		Herpetosiphon giganteus Hpa2	5' GRCGYC; 3' CYGCRG	5' ---GR CGYC--- 3'; 3' ---CYGC RG--- 5'	AcyI, AsuIII, BbiII, BstACI, HgiGI, HgiI, Hin1I, PamII
HgiDII		Herpetosiphon giganteus Hpa2	5' GTCGAC; 3' CAGCTG	5' ---G TCGAC--- 3'; 3' ---CAGCT G--- 5'
HgiEI		Herpetosiphon giganteus Hpg24	5' GGWCC; 3' CCWGG	5' ---G GWCC--- 3'; 3' ---CCWG G--- 5'	Bme216I, BthAI, DsaIV, ErpI, FspMSI, HgiHIII, **VpaK11AI**
HgiGI		Herpetosiphon giganteus Hpa1	5' GRCGYC; 3' CYGCRG	5' ---GR CGYC--- 3'; 3' ---CYGC RG--- 5'	AcyI, AosII, BbiII, BstACI, HgiI, HgiGI, Msp17I, PamII
HgiHI		Herpetosiphon giganteus HP1049	5' GGYRCC; 3' CCRYGG	5' ---G GYRCC--- 3'; 3' ---CCRYG G--- 5'	AccB1I, BanI, BspT107I, BshNI, Eco64I, HgiCI, MspB4I, PfaAI
HgiHII		Herpetosiphon giganteus HP1049	5' GRCGYC; 3' CYGCRG	5' ---GR CGYC--- 3'; 3' ---CYGC RG--- 5'	AosII, AsuIII, BsaHI, BstACI, HgiGI, HgiHII, Msp17I, PamII
HgiHIII		Herpetosiphon giganteus HP1049	5' GGWCC; 3' CCWGG	5' ---G GWCC--- 3'; 3' ---CCWG G--- 5'	Bme216I, DsaIV, ErpI, HgiBI, **Psp03I**, **VpaK11AI**, VpaK11BI
HgiJI		Herpetosiphon giganteus HFS101	5' GGWCC; 3' CCWGG	5' ---G GWCC--- 3'; 3' ---CCWG G--- 5'	Bme216I, CauI, DsaIV, FdiI, HgiBI, HgiHIII, **Psp03I**, **VpaK11AI**
HgiJII		Herpetosiphon giganteus HFS101	5' GRGCYC; 3' CYCGRG	5' ---GRGCY C--- 3'; 3' ---C YCGRG--- 5'
HgiS22I		Herpetosiphon giganteus	5' CCSGG; 3' GGSCC	5' ---CC SGG--- 3'; 3' ---GGS CC--- 5'	AhaI, AseII, AsuC2I, BcnI, CauII, **Eco1831I**, **EcoHI**, **Kpn49kII**
HhaI		Haemophilus haemolyticus	5' GCGC; 3' CGCG	5' ---GCG C--- 3'; 3' ---C GCG--- 5'	AspLEI, BspLAI, BstHHI, CfoI, FnuDIII, **Hin6I**, **HinP1I**, **SciNI**
HhaII		Haemophilus haemolyticus	5' GANTC; 3' CTNAG	5' ---G ANTC--- 3'; 3' ---CTNA G--- 5'
Hin1I		Haemophilus influenzae RFL1	5' GRCGYC; 3' CYGCRG	5' ---GR CGYC--- 3'; 3' ---CYGC RG--- 5'	AcyI, AhaII, AosII, AstWI, AsuIII, HgiI, HgiDI, HgiDI, Hsp92I
Hin1II		Haemophilus influenzae RFL1	5' CATG; 3' GTAC	5' ---CATG --- 3'; 3' --- GTAC--- 5'
Hin2I		Haemophilus influenzae RFL2	5' CCGG; 3' GGCC	5' ---C CGG--- 3'; 3' ---GGC C--- 5'
Hin4I		Haemophilus influenzae RFL4	5' GAYN_{5}VTC; 3' CTRN_{5}BAG	5' ---GAYN_{5}VTCN_{7}NNNNNN --- 3'; 3' ---CTRN_{5}BAGN_{7}N NNNNN--- 5'
Hin6I		Haemophilus influenzae RFL6	5' GCGC; 3' CGCG	5' ---G CGC--- 3'; 3' ---CGC G--- 5'	**AspLEI**, **BspLAI**, **BstHHI**, **CfoI**, **FnuDIII**, **HhaI**, HsoI, HspAI, SciNI
HinJCI		Haemophilus influenzae JC9	5' GTYRAC; 3' CARYTG	5' ---GTY RAC--- 3'; 3' ---CAR YTG--- 5'
HinP1I	2FL3 Search PDBe	Haemophilus influenzae P1	5' GCGC; 3' CGCG	5' ---G CGC--- 3'; 3' ---CGC G--- 5'	**BspLAI**, **BstHHI**, **CfoI**, **FnuDIII**, **HhaI**, Hin6I, HsoI, HspAI, SciNI
HincII	2AUD Search PDBe	Haemophilus influenzae Rc	5' GTYRAC; 3' CARYTG	5' ---GTY RAC--- 3'; 3' ---CAR YTG--- 5'
HindII		Haemophilus influenzae Rd	5' GTYRAC; 3' CARYTG	5' ---GTY RAC--- 3'; 3' ---CAR YTG--- 5'
HindIII	2E52, Search PDBe	Haemophilus influenzae Rd	5' AAGCTT; 3' TTCGAA	5' ---A AGCTT--- 3'; 3' ---TTCGA A--- 5'
HinfI		Haemophilus influenzae Rf	5' GANTC; 3' CTNAG	5' ---G ANTC--- 3'; 3' ---CTNA G--- 5'
HjaI		Hyphomonas jannaschiana	5' GATATC; 3' CTATAG	5' ---GAT ATC--- 3'; 3' ---CTA TAG--- 5'
HpaI		Haemophilus parainfluenzae	5' GTTAAC; 3' CAATTG	5' ---GTT AAC--- 3'; 3' ---CAA TTG--- 5'
HpaII		Haemophilus parainfluenzae	5' CCGG; 3' GGCC	5' ---C CGG--- 3'; 3' ---GGC C--- 5'
HphI		Haemophilus parahaemolyticus	5' GGTGA; 3' CCACT	5' ---GGTGAN_{6}NN --- 3'; 3' ---CCACTN_{6}N N--- 5'	AsuHPI, **SspD5I**
Hpy8I		Helicobacter pylori A 8-5	5' GTNNAC; 3' CANNTG	5' ---GTN NAC--- 3'; 3' ---CAN NTG--- 5'
Hpy51I		Helicobacter pylori 51	5' GTSAC; 3' CASTG	5' --- GTSAC--- 3'; 3' ---CASTG --- 5'
Hpy99I	3GOX	Helicobacter pylori J99	5' CGWCG; 3' GCWGC	5' ---CGWCG --- 3'; 3' --- GCWGC--- 5'
Hpy178III		Helicobacter pylori J178	5' TCNNGA; 3' AGNNCT	5' ---TC NNGA--- 3'; 3' ---AGNN CT--- 5'
Hpy188I		Helicobacter pylori J188	5' TCNGA; 3' AGNCT	5' ---TCN GA--- 3'; 3' ---AG NCT--- 5'
Hpy188III		Helicobacter pylori J188	5' TCNNGA; 3' AGNNCT	5' ---TC NNGA--- 3'; 3' ---AGNN CT--- 5'
HpyAV		Helicobacter pylori 26695	5' CCTTC; 3' GGAAG	5' ---CCTTCN_{4}NN --- 3'; 3' ---GGAAGN_{4}N N--- 5'
HpyBI		Helicobacter pylori Roberts	5' GTAC; 3' CATG	5' ---GT AC--- 3'; 3' ---CA TG--- 5'	AfaI, **Csp6I**, **CviQI**, **CviRII**, **PabI**, PlaAII, RsaI, **RsaNI**
HpyBII		Helicobacter pylori Roberts	5' GTNNAC; 3' CANNTG	5' ---GTN NAC--- 3'; 3' ---CAN NTG--- 5'
HpyCI		Helicobacter pylori	5' GATATC; 3' CTATAG	5' ---GAT ATC--- 3'; 3' ---CTA TAG--- 5'
HpyC1I		Helicobacter pylori	5' CCATC; 3' GGTAG	5' ---CCATCNNNN N--- 3'; 3' ---GGTAGNNNNN --- 5'
HpyCH4I		Helicobacter pylori CH4	5' CATG; 3' GTAC	5' ---CATG --- 3'; 3' --- GTAC--- 5'
HpyCH4III		Helicobacter pylori CH4	5' ACNGT; 3' TGNCA	5' ---ACN GT--- 3'; 3' ---TG NCA--- 5'
HpyCH4IV		Helicobacter pylori CH4	5' ACGT; 3' TGCA	5' ---A CGT--- 3'; 3' ---TGC A--- 5'
HpyCH4V		Helicobacter pylori CH4	5' TGCA; 3' ACGT	5' ---TG CA--- 3'; 3' ---AC GT--- 5'
HpyF10VI		Helicobacter pylori RFL10	5' GCN_{7}GC; 3' CGN_{7}CG	5' ---GCNNNNN NNGC--- 3'; 3' ---CGNN NNNNNCG--- 5'
HpyF44III		Helicobacter pylori RFL44	5' TGCA; 3' ACGT	5' ---TG CA--- 3'; 3' ---AC GT--- 5'
HsoI		Haemophilus somnus 2336	5' GCGC; 3' CGCG	5' ---G CGC--- 3'; 3' ---CGC G--- 5'	**AspLEI**, **BstHHI**, **CfoI**, **FnuDIII**, Hin6I, HinP1I, HspAI, SciNI
Hsp92I		Haemophilus sp. 92	5' GRCGYC; 3' CYGCRG	5' ---GR CGYC--- 3'; 3' ---CYGC RG--- 5'	AcyI, AhaII, AosII, AstWI, HgiI, HgiDI, HgiHII, Hin1I, Hsp92I
Hsp92II		Haemophilus sp. 92	5' CATG; 3' GTAC	5' ---CATG --- 3'; 3' --- GTAC--- 5'
HspAI		Haemophilus sp. A	5' GCGC; 3' CGCG	5' ---G CGC--- 3'; 3' ---CGC G--- 5'	**AspLEI**, **BspLAI**, **BstHHI**, **FnuDIII**, **HhaI**, Hin6I, HinP1I, HsoI, SciNI
HsuI		Haemophilus suis	5' AAGCTT; 3' TTCGAA	5' ---A AGCTT--- 3'; 3' ---TTCGA A--- 5'

=== I ===
**Enzyme**	**PDB code**	Source	**Recognition sequence**	**Cut**	**Isoschizomers**
ItaI		Ilyobcater tartaricus	5' GCNGC; 3' CGNCG	5' ---GC NGC--- 3'; 3' ---CGN CG--- 5'

=== K ===
**Enzyme**	**PDB code**	Source	**Recognition sequence**	**Cut**	**Isoschizomers**
KasI		Kluyvera ascorbata	5' GGCGCC; 3' CCGCGG	5' ---G GCGCC--- 3'; 3' ---CCGCG G--- 5'
Kaz48kI		Klebsiella azeanae	5' RGGNCCY; 3' YCCNGGR	5' ---RGGNC CY--- 3'; 3' ---YC CNGGR--- 5'
KoxII		Klebsiella oxytoca	5' GRGCYC; 3' CYCGRG	5' ---GRGCY C--- 3'; 3' ---C YCGRG--- 5'
KpnI		Klebsiella pneumoniae OK8	5' GGTACC; 3' CCATGG	5' ---GGTAC C--- 3'; 3' ---C CATGG--- 5'	**Acc65I**, **AhaB8I**, **Asp718I**, **SthI**
Kpn2I		Klebsiella pneumoniae RFL2	5' TCCGGA; 3' AGGCCT	5' ---T CCGGA--- 3'; 3' ---AGGCC T--- 5'	Aor13HI, BbvAIII, BseAI, BsiMI, BspEI, BspMII, CauB3I, MroI
Kpn378I		Klebsiella pneumoniae 378	5' CCGCGG; 3' GGCGCC	5' ---CCGC GG--- 3'; 3' ---GG CGCC--- 5'
Kpn2kI		Klebsiella pneumoniae 2k	5' CCNGG; 3' GGNCC	5' --- CCNGG--- 3'; 3' ---GGNCC --- 5'
Kpn49kI		Klebsiella pneumoniae 49k	5' GAATTC; 3' CTTAAG	5' ---G AATTC--- 3'; 3' ---CTTAA G--- 5'
Kpn49kII		Klebsiella pneumoniae 49k	5' CCSGG; 3' GGSCC	5' --- CCSGG--- 3'; 3' ---GGSCC --- 5'	**AhaI**, **AsuC2I**, **BcnI**, **CauII**, EcoHI, **HgiS22I**, **Mgl14481I**, **NciI**
KspI		Kluyvera sp.	5' CCGCGG; 3' GGCGCC	5' ---CCGC GG--- 3'; 3' ---GG CGCC--- 5'
Ksp22I		Kurthia sp. 22	5' TGATCA; 3' ACTAGT	5' ---T GATCA--- 3'; 3' ---ACTAG T--- 5'	AbaI, BclI, BsiQI, BspXII, BstT7I, FbaI, / ParI
Ksp632I		Kluyvera sp. 632	5' CTCTTC; 3' GAGAAG	5' ---CTCTTCN NNN--- 3'; 3' ---GAGAAGNNNN --- 5'
KspAI		Kurthia sp. N88	5' GTTAAC; 3' CAATTG	5' ---GTT AAC--- 3'; 3' ---CAA TTG--- 5'
Kzo9I		Kurthia zopfii 9	5' GATC; 3' CTAG	5' --- GATC--- 3'; 3' ---CTAG --- 5'	Bce243I, Bsp105I, BspFI, BstMBI, CpfI, LlaAI, NdeII, Sth368I
Kzo49I		Kurthia zopfii 49	5' GGWCC; 3' CCWGG	5' ---G GWCC--- 3'; 3' ---CCWG G--- 5'	Bme216I, CauI, DsaIV, FdiI, HgiBI, HgiHIII, **Psp03I**, **VpaK11AI**
