= Chloroflexus islandicus =

Scientific classification
- Domain: Bacteria
- Kingdom: Bacillati
- Phylum: Chloroflexota
- Class: Chloroflexia
- Order: Chloroflexales
- Family: Chloroflexaceae
- Genus: Chloroflexus
- Species: C. islandicus

Binomial name
- Chloroflexus islandicus National Center for Biotechnology Information (2017)

Species of bacterium

Chloroflexus islandicus is a photosynthetic bacterium isolated from the Strokkur Geyser in Iceland. This organism is thermophilic showing optimal growth at 55 °C (131 °F) with a pH range of 7.5 – 7.7. C. islandicus grows best photoheterotrophically under anaerobic conditions with light but is capable of chemoheterotrophically growth under aerobic conditions in the dark. C. islandicus has a yellowish green color. The individual cells form unbranched multicellular filaments about 0.6 μm in diameter and 4-7 μm in length.

== Phenotypic characteristics ==
As a genus, Chloroflexus spp. are filamentous anoxygenic phototrophic (FAP) organisms that utilize type II photosynthetic reaction centers containing bacteriochlorophyll a, and light-harvesting chlorosomes containing bacteriochlorophyll. Beta- and gamma-carotenes are present. C. islandicus is gram negative. Cell morphology shows the presence of chlorosomes, pili and gliding motility. Pili are unique to C. islandicus being the only organism in the Chloroflexus genus to possess pili.

== Genetic characteristics ==
The whole genome sequence of Chloroflexus islandicus was able to be determined (5.14 Mb). Using the 16S rRNA gene analysis, ANI (Average Nucleotide Identity) and DDH (DNA-DNA Hybridization) a new species of Chloroflexus was confirmed. The 16S rRNA analysis showed it is closely related to Chloroflexus aggregans (97.0%). The genomic data revealed 84.1% ANI and 22.8% DDH for Chloroflexus islandicus strain vs other known Chloroflexus strains. The separated species based on ANI is 95.0% or less and DDH is 70.0% or less. The G/C content for Chloroflexus islandicus was found to be 59.6 mol%.

== See also ==
- Chloroflexota
- Endosymbiotic theory
