= Roseiflexus castenholzii =

Scientific classification
- Domain: Bacteria
- Kingdom: Bacillati
- Phylum: Chloroflexota
- Class: Chloroflexia
- Order: Chloroflexales
- Family: Roseiflexaceae
- Genus: Roseiflexus
- Species: R. castenholzii

Binomial name
- Roseiflexus castenholzii Hanada et al., 2002

Species of bacterium

Roseiflexus castenholzii is a heterotrophic, thermophilic, filamentous anoxygenetic phototroph (FAP) bacterium. This species is in one of two genera of FAPs that lack chlorosomes. R. castenholzii was first isolated from red-colored bacterial mats located Nakabusa hot springs in Japan. Because this organism is a phototroph, it utilizes photosynthesis to fix carbon dioxide and build biomolecules. R. castenholzii has three photosynthetic complexes: light-harvesting only, reaction center only, and light-harvesting with reaction center.

== Morphology ==
This bacterium has a cell diameter is of 0.8–1.0 micrometers but does not have a definite length because of its multicellular filamentous structure. The bacterium is red to reddish-brown forms distinct red bacterial mats in the natural environment. R. castenholzii lacks internal vesicles, internal membranes, and complex structures. This species has gliding motility.

== Phylogeny ==
The five currently known genera of FAP organisms are Chloroflexus, Choronema, Oscillochloris, Roseiflexus, and Heliothrix. Of these five, only two do not contain chlorosomes: Roseiflexus and Heliothrix. Roseiflexus and Heliothrix are both red due to only having Bchl a as a photosynthetic pigment. In most other aspects, both phenotypically and genetically, the genera Roseiflexus and Heliothrix are different from each other. Little is known about the taxonomy of the Roseiflexus genus due to it only containing one known species: Roseiflexus casternholzii.

== Habitat ==
When first discovered, Roseiflexus castenholzii was isolated from the lowest layer of a three layered bacterial mat; the top two layers contained cyanobacteria and Chloroflexus spp. These mats were found in multiple Japanese hot springs ranging in temperature from 45.5 °C to 68.5 °C and with a neutral to alkaline pH range.

This bacterium is able to grow photoheterotrophically under anaerobic light conditions and chemoheterotrophically under aerobic dark conditions. Optimal growth conditions for this organism are 50 °C and pH 7.5–8.0. The first isolated type strain was HLO8T (= DSM 13941T = JCM 11240T).

== Photosynthesis ==
In order to conduct photosynthesis, Roseiflexus castenholzii contains three different complexes: light-harvesting only (LH), reaction center only (RC) and light-harvesting with reaction center (LHRC). In contrast to most other FAPs, R. castenholzii does not have chlorosomes, which contain great amounts of photosynthetic pigments. Because chlorosomes can obstruct observations of photosynthetic complexes, Roseiflexus castenholzii is considered a model organism to study the reaction centers FAPs have.

The LHRC contains both light harvesting and reaction center peptides that allow for absorbing light and exciting electrons in one complex. The light-harvesting complex contains antenna pigments that allow the bacterium to absorb light around 800 nanometers. The majority of these pigments are bacteriochlorophyll (BChl). The reaction center in Roseiflexus castenholzii is closely related to the RC of Chloroflexus aurantiacus. R. castenholzii's RC complex contains three subunits: L, M, and a c-type cytochrome. It lacks the H subunit common in purple bacteria. The RC also contains BChl and bacteriopheophytin (BPhe) pigments.
