= Dehalogenimonas lykanthroporepellens =

Scientific classification
- Domain: Bacteria
- Kingdom: Bacillati
- Phylum: Chloroflexota
- Class: Dehalococcoidia
- Order: Dehalococcoidales
- Family: Dehalococcoidaceae
- Genus: Dehalogenimonas
- Species: D. lykanthroporepellans

Binomial name
- Dehalogenimonas lykanthroporepellans Moe et al. 2009

Species of bacterium

Dehalogenimonas lykanthroporepellens is an anaerobic, Gram-negative bacteria in the phylum Chloroflexota isolated from a Superfund site in Baton Rouge, Louisiana. It is useful in bioremediation for its ability to reductively dehalogenate chlorinated alkanes.

== Discovery and description ==
Dehalogenimonas lykanthroporepellens cells are Gram-negative, non-motile, irregular cocci that are 0.3–0.6 μm in diameter. There is no evidence of pathogenicity. They are mesophiles that can grow in a temperature range of 20–34 °C with their optimum temperature range being 28–34 °C. They grow best in pH 7-7.5 (pH range 6–8, although it was isolated from groundwater of pH 5.1). Growth has been observed in salt concentrations from 0.1–2% NaCl with optimum growth at ≤1%. GC-content reported in characterization of D. lykanthroporellens is 53.8% as determined by HPLC; however, as determined by genomic analysis, the GC-content is 55.04%. D. lyankanthroporepellens does not form spores. Resistance to the antibiotics ampicillin and vancomycin has been observed.

D. lykanthroporepellens is strictly anaerobic and uses hydrogen as an electron donor. It has been cultured in an anaerobic basal medium at 30 °C in the dark. It is able to reductively dehalogenate aliphatic alkanes (non-aromatic alkanes) such as 1,2,3-trichloropropane (reduces it to allyl chloride which abiotically transforms in the presence of water to allyl alcohol).

Two strains (BL-DC-9^{T} and BL-DC-8) were isolated from a Superfund site in Baton Rouge, Louisiana in 2009 by Moe, Yan, Nobre, Costa, and Rainey—researchers at Louisiana State University and the University of Coimbra (Coimbra, Portugal). A Superfund site is an abandoned site that contains hazardous waste. This site was contaminated with chlorinated solvents.

The genus name Dehalogenimonas reflects its ability to dehalogenate chlorinated alkanes. The species name lykanthroporepellens comes from lykanthropos meaning werewolf and re-pellens meaning repelling. The species name refers to the garlic smell of the bacteria when cultured. Some folklore states that garlic can be used to repel creatures like werewolves and vampires.

== Phylogeny ==
There are six classes within the phylum Chloroflexota: Chloroflexia, Anaerolinea, Caldilinea, Dehalococcoidia (previously known informally as Dehalococcoidetes), Ktedonobacteria, and Thermomicrobia. D. lykanthroporepellens is in the class Dehalococcoidia. Chloroflexota consists of the green non-sulfur bacteria which are anoxygenic phototrophs (do not produce oxygen during photosynthesis) that use either H_{2} or H_{2}S as an electron donor. However, D. lykanthroporepellens uses polychlorinated aliphatic alkanes as the electron acceptor. Chloroflexota are the deepest branching (oldest) anoxygenic phototrophs on the tree of life.

Many of the species in Chloroflexota are thermophilic however Dehalogenimonas lykanthroporepellens is a mesophile. The Oscillochloris (Class Chloroflexia) are also mesophilic. Despite this relationship, D. lykanthroporepellens is more closely related to the Dehalococcoides (class Dehalococcoidia) with 90% 16S rRNA gene sequence similarity. D. lykanthroporepellens also differ from other species in the phylum Chloroflexota in that they are not filamentous.

== Metabolism ==
Dehalogenimonas lykanthroporepellens is a chemotrophic organism that uses H_{2} as an electron donor and polychlorinated aliphatic alkanes as an electron acceptor. These molecules include 1,2,3-trichloropropane, 1,2-dichloropropane, 1,1,2,2-tetrachloroethane, 1,1,2-trichloroethane, and 1,2-dichloroethane. However, there are several chlorinated alkanes that it cannot reduce, such as 1-chloropropane and 2-chloropropane. It uses these compounds as electron acceptors in dihaloelimination reactions. In dihaloelimination the electron donor (H_{2} in this case) is used to remove two halogens from adjacent carbons, forming a double bond between them. 1,2,3-trichloropropane is reduced to allyl chloride by D. lykanthroporepellens, and further transformed abiotically to allyl alcohol in the presence of water (other abiotic reactions can occur). The carbon source has not been determined for this species but other organisms within Chloroflexota use CO_{2} as a carbon source.

== Genome ==
Although two strains of D. lykanthroporepellens have been isolated and characterized, only the type strain BL-DC-9^{T} has had the genome sequenced. Therefore, when referring to D. lykanthroporepellens in this section, all information is only verified for BL-DC-9^{T}. D. lykanthroporepellens has a circular chromosome consisting of 1,686,510 bp and a G-C content of 55.04%. The genome was sequenced using both Illumina and 454 sequencing. Genes were annotated using a combination of automated and manual curation. 1,771 genes were predicted, in which 1,720 were protein-coding genes and 51 were RNAs. Putative function was designated to nearly 70% of the protein-coding genes.

Interest in D. lykanthroporepellens stems from its ability to degrade polychlorinated aliphatic alkanes into nonhazardous products. The catalysis of reductive dehalogenation of chlorinated compounds is dependent on the presence and expression of genes coding for reductive dehalogenase enzymes. These genes are organized in rdhAB operons, which encode the RdhA protein (reductive dehalogenase) and the RdhB protein (membrane anchor). D. lykanthroporepellens was shown to have several rdhA and rdhB genes in the chromosome.

Furthermore, D. lykanthroporepellens has a prophage region containing 45 hypothetic proteins, which accounts for roughly 4% of the chromosome. An additional ~4.3% of the genome of D. lykanthroporepellens is made up of insertion sequence elements, which encode for 74 full or truncated transposases. Thus, horizontal gene transfer appears to be a potential mechanism for the adaptation of D. lykanthroporepellens to its ecological niche.

== Application in bioremediation ==
Polychlorinated aliphatic C2 and C3 alkanes are industrially important chemical intermediates globally produced on a massive scale. Due to spills and past inappropriate disposal methods, these chlorinated compounds are prevalent groundwater and soil contaminants throughout the US and around the world. Bioremediation approaches that rely on the action of anaerobic, reductively-dehalogenating bacteria, such as D. lykanthroporepellens, have shown great promise for clean-up of chlorinated solvent-contaminated soil and groundwater. Using qPCR, 16S rRNA gene sequences for Dehalogenimonas strains have been found to be at concentrations as high as 10^{6} copies/ml of groundwater contaminated with high concentrations of chlorinated solvents and comprise up to nearly 19% of the total bacterial 16S rRNA gene copies.

The characterization of D. lykanthroporepellens has aided in remediation plans through better understanding of the overall process of reductive dehalogenation of chlorinated compounds present in groundwater and the diversity of organisms involved. Due to its close relationship to Dehalococcoides spp., D. lykanthroporepellens was found to be amplified by primers that at one time were believed to be specific to targeting Dehalococcoides spp. Differentiation between the presence of Dehalococcoides spp. and D. lykanthroporepellens is important for remediation planning because D. lykanthroporepellens dehalogenates polychlorinated alkanes, but is unable to dehalogenate chlorinated ethenes like Dehalococcoides spp. Furthermore, D. lykanthroporepellens was the first pure culture isolated which could dehalogenate 1,2,3-trichloropropane (1,2,3-TCP) under anaerobic conditions. D. lykanthroporepellens has also been shown to dehalogenate 1,2-dichloroethane (1,2-DCA), 1,2-dichloropropane (1,2-DCP), and 1,1,2-trichloroethane (1,1,2-TCA) present in mixtures and at concentrations as high as 8.7, 4.0, and 3.8 mM respectively. These findings are important because a large number of contaminated sites contain mixtures of various chlorinated solvents and/or high concentrations.
