= Herpetosiphon giganteus =

Scientific classification
- Domain: Bacteria
- Kingdom: Bacillati
- Phylum: Chloroflexota
- Class: Chloroflexia
- Order: Herpetosiphonales
- Family: Herpetosiphonaceae
- Genus: Herpetosiphon
- Species: H. giganteus

Binomial name
- Herpetosiphon giganteus (ex Reichenbach and Golecki 1975) Pan et al. 2017

Synonyms
- "Herpetosiphon giganteus" Reichenbach & Golecki 1975

Species of Gram-positive bacterium

Herpetosiphon giganteus is a species of bacteria in the genus Herpetosiphon known to produce 16 restriction enzymes.

H. giganteus has been studied for its gliding motility.
