= Chloroflexus-1 RNA motif =

Chloroflexus-1
- Consensus secondary structure and sequence conservation of Chloroflexus-1 RNA

Identifiers
- Symbol: Chloroflexus-1
- Rfam: RF02936

Other data
- RNA type: Gene; sRNA
- SO: SO:0001263
- PDB structures: PDBe

The Chloroflexus-1 RNA motif is a conserved RNA structure that was discovered by bioinformatics. Chloroflexus-1 motifs are found in the genus Chloroflexus, under the phylum Chloroflexota.

Chloroflexus-1 RNAs likely function in trans as sRNAs. The motif's nucleic acid secondary structure consists of several small hairpins. Although the sizes of the stems and terminal loops of these hairpins are quite consistent, the nucleotide sequences in the hairpins are different, suggesting that the hairpins are not repetitive.
