= Chloroflexi-1 RNA motif =

RNA structure

Chloroflexi-1 RNA
- Consensus secondary structure of Chloroflexi-1 RNAs

Identifiers
- Symbol: Chloroflexi-1
- Rfam: RF01698

Other data
- RNA type: sRNA
- Domain: Chloroflexus aggregans
- PDB structures: PDBe

The Chloroflexi-1 RNA motif is a conserved RNA structure detected by bioinformatics within the species Chloroflexus aggregans. C. aggregans has three predicted Chloroflexi-1 RNAs, which are located nearby to one another. This arrangement might suggest a repetitive element. C. aggregans is classified as belonging to the bacterial phylum Chloroflexota (formerly Chloroflexi).

== See also ==
- Acido-Lenti-1 RNA motif
- Bacteroidales-1 RNA motif
- Collinsella-1 RNA motif
- Flavo-1 RNA motif
