= Chloroflexi =

Chloroflexi is a temporary taxon name for:

- Chloroflexi (phylum), now named Chloroflexota
- Chloroflexi (class), now named Chloroflexia
