= Dehalogenimonas =

Scientific classification
- Domain: Bacteria
- Kingdom: Bacillati
- Phylum: Chloroflexota
- Class: Dehalococcoidia
- Order: Dehalococcoidales
- Family: Dehalococcoidaceae
- Genus: Dehalogenimonas; Moe et al. 2009

Type species
- Dehalogenimonas lykanthroporepellens Moe et al. 2009

Species
- D. alkenigignens; D. etheniformans; D. formicexedens; D. loeffleri; D. lykanthroporepellens

Genus of bacteria

Dehalogenimonas is a genus in the phylum Chloroflexota (Bacteria). Members of the genus Dehalogenimonas can be referred to as dehalogenimonads (viz. Trivialisation of names).

== Etymology ==
The name Dehalogenimonas derives from:
Latin prep. de, away, off; Neo-Latin noun halogenum, halogen; Latin feminine gender noun monas (μονάς), unit, monad; Neo-Latin feminine gender noun Dehalogenimonas, dehalogenating monad, reflecting the ability of these bacteria to dehalogenate chlorinated alkanes.

The type species of the genus is D. lykanthroporepellens (Moe et al. 2009). The species epithet derives from the Greek noun lykanthropos (λυκάνθρωπος), werewolf; Latin participle adjective repellens, repelling; Neo-Latin participle adjective lykanthroporepellens, repelling `werewolves, because compounds exhibiting a pungent garlic aroma are produced when these organisms grow in the presence of 1,2,3-trichloropropane as an electron acceptor and sulfide as a reducing agent, garlic being said to repel werewolves in some fiction literature.

== Phylogeny ==
The currently accepted taxonomy is based on the List of Prokaryotic names with Standing in Nomenclature (LPSN) and National Center for Biotechnology Information (NCBI).

16S rRNA based LTP_07_2026

- Dehalogenimonas
  - D. lykanthroporepellens
  - - D. alkenigignens
    - - D. etheniformans
      - D. formicexedens

120 marker proteins based GTDB release 11-RS232

- Dehalogenimonas
  - - D. loeffleri Wang et al. 2026
    - D. lykanthroporepellens Moe et al. 2009
  - - D. alkenigignens Bowman et al. 2013
    - - D. etheniformans Cui et al. 2023
      - D. formicexedens Key et al. 2017

== See also ==
- Bacterial taxonomy
- Microbiology
- List of bacterial orders
- List of bacteria genera
