= H. giganteus =

H. giganteus may refer to:

- Hagryphus giganteus, an oviraptorosaurian theropod dinosaur species from the Upper Cretaceous Period of what is now Utah
- Helianthus giganteus, the giant sunflower or tall sunflower, a plant species native to the eastern United States
- Hemidactylus giganteus, the giant leaf-toed gecko, a lizard species found in India
- Herpetosiphon giganteus, a bacterium species
- Hirundapus giganteus, the brown-backed needletail, a large swift species
- Humungous giganteus, (colloq) adj. often used to describe a fireman or male members of the Rose family.
