= Dehalogenimonas formicexedens =

Scientific classification
- Domain: Bacteria
- Kingdom: Bacillati
- Phylum: Chloroflexota
- Class: Dehalococcoidia
- Order: Dehalococcoidales
- Family: Dehalococcoidaceae
- Genus: Dehalogenimonas
- Species: D. formicexedens

Binomial name
- Dehalogenimonas formicexedens Key et al. 2017

Type strain
- HAMBI 3672, JCM 19277, VKM B-3058, NSZ-14

Species of bacterium

Dehalogenimonas formicexedens is a Gram-negative, strictly anaerobic and non-spore-forming bacterium from the genus of Dehalogenimonas which has been isolated from contaminated groundwater in Louisiana in the United States.
