= Dehalogenimonas alkenigignens =

Scientific classification
- Domain: Bacteria
- Kingdom: Bacillati
- Phylum: Chloroflexota
- Class: Dehalococcoidia
- Order: Dehalococcoidales
- Family: Dehalococcoidaceae
- Genus: Dehalogenimonas
- Species: D. alkenigignens

Binomial name
- Dehalogenimonas alkenigignens Bowman et al. 2013

Type strain
- IP3-3, SBP1, JCM 17062, NRRL B-59545

Species of bacterium

Dehalogenimonas alkenigignens is a strictly anaerobic bacterium from the genus of Dehalogenimonas which has been isolated from groundwater from Louisiana in the United States.
