= Chloroflexus aggregans =

Scientific classification
- Domain: Bacteria
- Kingdom: Bacillati
- Phylum: Chloroflexota
- Class: Chloroflexia
- Order: Chloroflexales
- Family: Chloroflexaceae
- Genus: Chloroflexus
- Species: C. aggregans

Binomial name
- Chloroflexus aggregans Hanada et al. 1995

Species of bacterium

Chloroflexus aggregans is a bacterium from the genus Chloroflexus which has been isolated from hot springs in Japan.

== Etymology ==
The Chloroflexus aggregans name origins from aggregate forming strains indicative of a new species from the Chloroflexus genus. The naming of the C. aggregans comes from the visible aggregates formed by the species.

== Discovery and isolation ==
In 1995, Satoshi Hanada, Akira Hiraishi, Keizo Shimada, and Katsumi Matsuura discovered a new strain of the Chloroflexus genus, named as the Chloroflexus aggregans. The researchers discovered two strains of this bacterial species: MD-66T and YI-9. The "T" in MD-66T represents the type strain. The former, MD-66T strain, was discovered from the Meotobuchi hot spring while the YI-9 strain was from the Yufuin hot spring.

== Phylogenetics ==
Phylogenetically, Chloroflexus bacteria are very distinct from green sulfur bacteria but are still taxonomic relatives. Thus, there is some overlap between these groups. For instance, the light harvesting systems responsible for photosynthesis in both groups rely on bacteriochlorophyll pigments. Currently, the molecular phylogenetic data remains unknown for most Chloroflexus strains. Moreover, Chloroflexus strains have not yet been isolated in axenic cultures—meaning, strains that are able to be grown in the absence of other types of species. Currently, the closest known relative to C. aggregans is C. aurantiacus.

== Morphology ==
The naming of the C. aggregans comes from the visible aggregates formed by the species. At first, the researchers classified these microbes as the C. aurantiacus species because they had a similar morphological appearance. In addition, they had a high degree of genetic similarity. However, C. aggregans' production of mat-like aggregates when cultured in the researchers' lab suggested that it was a different species than C. aurantiacus, resulting in the discovery of a new species.

== Genomics ==
Phenotypically, the species resembles the Chloroflexus aurantiacus bacteria. Genotypically, the species' 16S rRNA sequences are 92.8% similar to C. aurantiacus. Its genome is 4.7 Megabases (Mb).

== Metabolism ==
Chloroflexus aggregans have an extremely versatile mixotrophic metabolism. This is an advantage for their environment, since the microbial mats they inhabit have constantly fluctuating conditions that follow a general daily cycle. During the daytime, when light is abundant, it is their main energy source and C. aggregans exhibit photoautotrophy, photomixotrophy, and photoheterotrophy. They perform photosynthesis through the use of their chlorosomes, which are large pigment-containing complexes that can harvest light. During the afternoon, when there is less light and lower oxygen concentrations in the microbial mats, the bacteria switch to chemoheterophy and use oxygen as their final electron acceptor (O_{2} respiration). At night, when light is not available and the microbial mats are anaerobic, the bacteria continue to exhibit a chemoheterotrophic metabolism, but it is instead based on fermentation. Finally to complete their daily metabolic cycle, C. aggregans vertically migrate to the surface of their microbial mats, which are microaerobic, in the early morning. Here, they switch to chemoautotrophy based on O_{2} respiration. When exhibiting heterotrophy, C. aggregans can utilize a diverse range of organic substrates as their carbon source, but grow optimally when either yeast extract or Casamino Acids are used.

== Ecology ==
Currently, C. aggregans are known to reside in microbial mats in freshwater hot springs, living closely associated with other microorganisms in multilayered sheets. Specifically, they have been discovered and sampled from these hot springs in Japan. They coexist with filamentous, unicellular cyanobacteria in these mats. When exhibiting a heterotrophic metabolism, C. aggregans rely on organic substrates excreted from these cyanobacterial neighbors to obtain carbon for biosynthesis. To occupy these hot springs, C. aggregans are thermophiles and isolated cultures have been shown to exhibit optimal growth between 50–60 °C (122–140 °F). They are filamentous, meaning the cells grow into long rods that only divide terminally, forming unbranched, multicellular filaments. Uniquely, these long filaments of C. aggregans then associate into dense, mat-like aggregates, setting the bacteria apart from other species of Chloroflexus.

== Evolution of photosynthesis ==
16S rRNA data has shown that bacterial species within the Chloroflexus genus are among the earliest bacteria that were able to perform photosynthesis. However, much still remains unknown about Chloroflexus aggregans and its complete genome has yet to be fully sequenced. Thus, continued study of this organism could be important to help elucidate the origins of photosynthesis in bacteria. In addition, studying the broader evolutionary relationships of C. aggregans to other groups of early photosynthetic bacteria could help scientists build a phylogenetic tree of these related phyla, deducing their evolutionary order. For instance, a study comparing the signature sequences in highly conserved proteins of photosynthetic bacteria found that organisms in the genus Chloroflexus evolved before cyanobacteria. Resolving these phylogenies could further help scientists understand how photosynthesis developed. Today, this process sustains almost all life on Earth by providing oxygen to the atmosphere and energy for organisms in higher trophic levels. Therefore, it is highly valuable to study how this process first arose.
