= Heliothrix =

Scientific classification
- Domain: Bacteria
- Kingdom: Bacillati
- Phylum: Chloroflexota
- Class: Chloroflexia
- Order: Chloroflexales
- Family: Roseiflexaceae
- Genus: Heliothrix; Pierson et al. 1986
- Species: H. oregonensis

Binomial name
- Heliothrix oregonensis Pierson et al. 1986

Species of bacterium

Heliothrix oregonensis is a phototrophic filamentous, gliding bacterium containing bacteriochlorophyll a that is aerotolerant and photoheterotrophic. It is the only species in the genus Heliothrix.
