= Thermomicrobiales =

Scientific classification
- Domain: Bacteria
- Kingdom: Pseudomonadati
- Phylum: Thermomicrobiota
- Class: Thermomicrobia
- Order: Thermomicrobiales; Garrity & Holt 2002

Family
- Thermomicrobiaceae

Order of bacteria

Thermomicrobiales is an order of thermophilic green non-sulfur bacteria within the class of Thermomicrobia. This order contains one family with a validly published name, Thermobicrobiaceae

== Phylogeny ==
The currently accepted taxonomy is based on the List of Prokaryotic names with Standing in Nomenclature (LPSN) and National Center for Biotechnology Information (NCBI).

16S rRNA based LTP_10_2024

- Thermomicrobia
  - - Sphaerobacterales
      - Sphaerobacteraceae
        Sphaerobacter
  - - Nitrolancea
    - - Thermomicrobiales
        - Thermomicrobiaceae
          - Thermalbibacter
          - - Thermomicrobium
            - Thermorudis

120 marker proteins based GTDB 09-RS220

- Thermomicrobiales
  - Thermomicrobiaceae
    - - Nitrolancea
      - Sphaerobacter
    - - Thermalbibacter
      - - Thermomicrobium
        - Thermorudis

== See also ==
- List of bacteria genera
- List of bacterial orders
