= Roseiflexus =

Scientific classification
- Domain: Bacteria
- Kingdom: Bacillati
- Phylum: Chloroflexota
- Class: Chloroflexia
- Order: Chloroflexales
- Family: Roseiflexaceae
- Genus: Roseiflexus; Hanada et al. 2002

Type species
- Roseiflexus castenholzii Hanada et al. 2002

Species
- R. castenholzii

Genus of bacteria

Roseiflexus is a genus of bacteria in the family Roseiflexaceae with one known species (Roseiflexus castenholzii).

== See also ==
- List of bacteria genera
- List of bacterial orders
