= Ardenticatena =

Scientific classification
- Domain: Bacteria
- Kingdom: Bacillati
- Phylum: Chloroflexota
- Class: Ardenticatenia; Kawaichi et al. 2013
- Order: Ardenticatenales; Kawaichi et al. 2013
- Family: Ardenticatenaceae; Kawaichi et al. 2013
- Genus: Ardenticatena; Kawaichi et al. 2013
- Species: A. maritima

Binomial name
- Ardenticatena maritima Kawaichi et al. 2013

Genus of bacteria

Ardenticatena is a Gram-negative, thermophilic and chemoheterotrophic genus of bacteria from the family Ardenticatenaceae with one known species (Ardenticatena maritima). Ardenticatena maritima has been isolated from iron-rich sediments from a coastal hydrothermal field from Kagoshima in Japan.
