= Acido-Lenti-1 RNA motif =

Acido-Lenti-1 RNA
- Consensus secondary structure of Acido-Lenti-1 RNAs

Identifiers
- Symbol: Acido-Lenti-1
- Rfam: RF01687

Other data
- RNA type: sRNA
- Domain(s): Acidobacteriota, Lentisphaerota
- PDB structures: PDBe

The Acido-Lenti-1 RNA motif describes a predicted non-coding RNA that is found in bacteria within the phyla acidobacteriota and lentisphaerota. It is sometimes found nearby to group II introns, but the reason for this apparent association is unknown.

== See also ==
- Bacteroidales-1 RNA motif
- Collinsella-1 RNA motif
- Chloroflexi-1 RNA motif
- Flavo-1 RNA motif
