= Flavo-1 RNA motif =

Flavo-1 RNA
- Consensus secondary structure of Flavo-1 RNAs

Identifiers
- Symbol: Flavo-1
- Rfam: RF01705

Other data
- RNA type: Gene; sRNA
- Domain(s): Bacteroidota, Spirochaetota
- PDB structures: PDBe

The Flavo-1 RNA motif is a conserved RNA structure that was identified by bioinformatics. The vast majority of Flavo-1 RNAs are found in Flavobacteria, but some were detected in the phylum Bacteroidota, which contains Flavobacteria, or the phylum Spirochaetota, which is evolutionarily related to Bacteroidota. It was presumed that Flavo-1 RNAs function as non-coding RNAs.

== See also ==
- Acido-Lenti-1 RNA motif
- Bacteroidales-1 RNA motif
- Collinsella-1 RNA motif
- Chloroflexi-1 RNA motif
