= Bacteroidales-1 RNA motif =

Bacteroidales-1 RNA
- Consensus secondary structure of Bacteroidales-1 RNAs

Identifiers
- Symbol: Bacteroidales-1
- Rfam: RF01693

Other data
- RNA type: sRNA
- Domain: Bacteroidales
- PDB structures: PDBe

The Bacteroidales-1 RNA motif is a conserved RNA structure identified by bioinformatics. It has been identified only in bacteria within the order (biology) Bacteroidales. Its presumed length is marked by a promoter on one end that conforms to an alternate consensus sequence that is common in the phylum Bacteroidota, and its 3′ end is indicated by predicted transcription terminators. It is often located downstream of a gene that encodes the L20 ribosomal subunit, although it is unclear whether there is a functional reason underlying this apparent association.

Bacteroidales-1 RNA motif has been reported as a 6S RNA homologue by a report of Bacteroides thetaiotaomicron transcriptome map. The existence of small product RNAs (pRNAs) that rescue sequestered RNA polymerases, validated 6S RNA-mediated regulation of transcriptional activity.

== See also ==
- Acido-Lenti-1 RNA motif
- Collinsella-1 RNA motif
- Chloroflexi-1 RNA motif
- Flavo-1 RNA motif
