= Collinsella-1 RNA motif =

Collinsella-1 RNA
- Consensus secondary structure of Collinsella-1 RNAs

Identifiers
- Symbol: Collinsella-1
- Rfam: RF01700

Other data
- RNA type: sRNA
- PDB structures: PDBe

The Collinsella-1 RNA motif denotes a particular conserved RNA structure discovered by bioinformatics. Of the six sequences belonging to this motif that were originally identified, five are from uncultivated bacteria residing in the human gut, while only the sixth is in a cultivated species, Collinsella aerofaciens. The evidence supporting the stem-loops designated as "P1" and "P2" is ambiguous.

== See also ==
- Acido-Lenti-1 RNA motif
- Bacteroidales-1 RNA motif
- Chloroflexi-1 RNA motif
- Flavo-1 RNA motif
