= Haemophilus pittmaniae =

Scientific classification
- Domain: Bacteria
- Kingdom: Pseudomonadati
- Phylum: Pseudomonadota
- Class: Gammaproteobacteria
- Order: Pasteurellales
- Family: Pasteurellaceae
- Genus: Haemophilus
- Species: H. pittmaniae

Binomial name
- Haemophilus pittmaniae Nørskov-Lauritsen et al. 2005

Species of bacterium

Haemophilus pittmaniae is a Gram-negative species of bacterium of the family Pasteurellaceae. Strains of this species were originally isolated from humans. The species may be associated with respiratory infections in individuals with lung disease.
