= Brazilian purpuric fever =

- Specialty: Infectious diseases

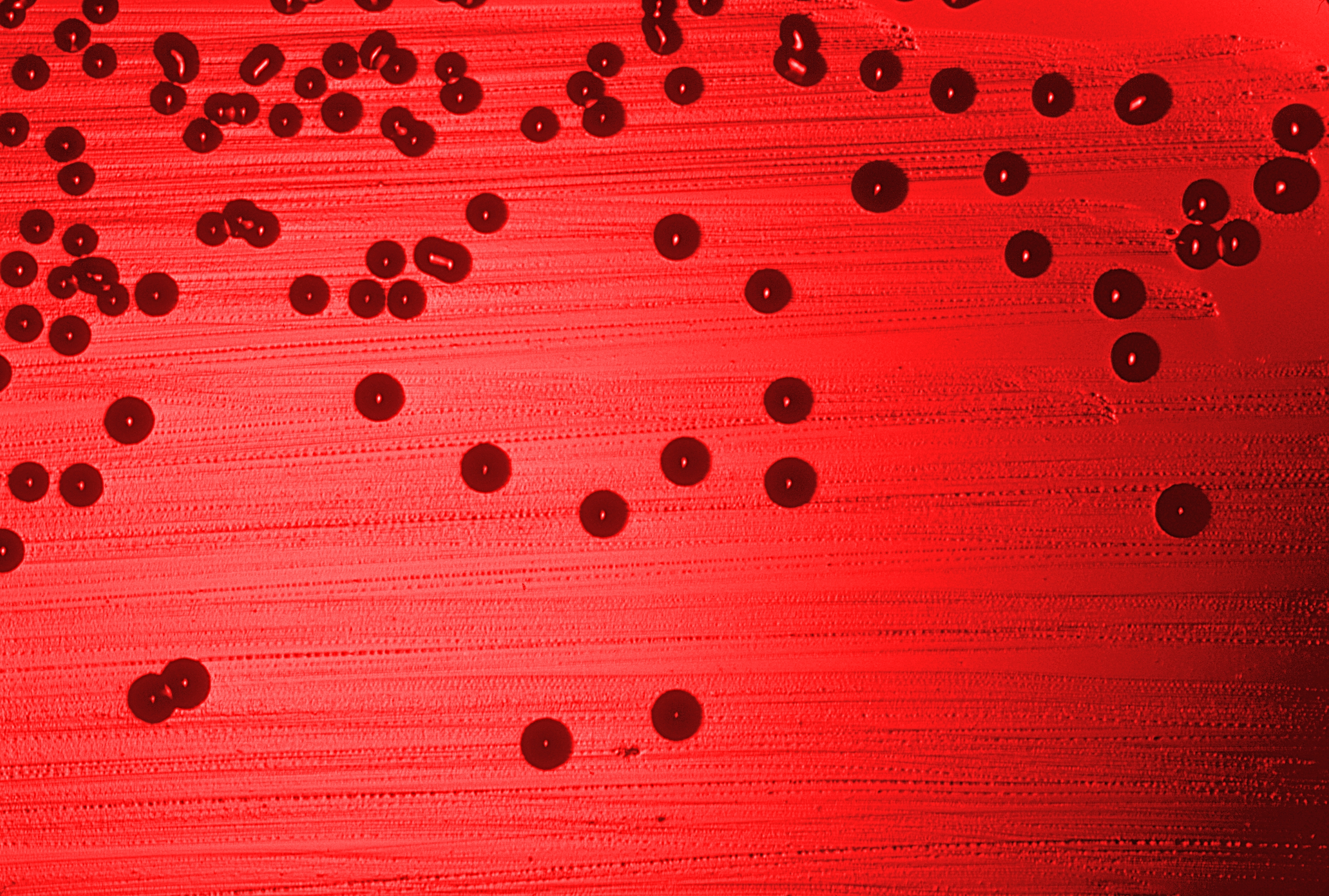
Haemophilus influenza cultivated on a blood agar plate.

Brazilian purpuric fever (BPF) is an illness of children caused by the bacterium Haemophilus influenzae biogroup aegyptius which is ultimately fatal due to sepsis. BPF was first recognized in the São Paulo state of Brazil in 1984. At this time, young children between the ages of 3 months and 10 years were contracting a strange illness which was characterized by high fever and purpuric lesions on the body. These cases were all fatal, and originally thought to be due to meningitis. It was not until the autopsies were conducted that the cause of these deaths was confirmed to be infection by H. influenzae aegyptius. Although BPF was thought to be confined to Brazil, other cases occurred in Australia and the United States during 1984–1990.

Haemophilus species are non-spore-forming gram-negative coccobacilli . They lack motility and are aerobic or facultatively anaerobic. They require preformed growth factors that are present in blood, specifically hemin (X factor) and NAD or NADP (V factor). The bacterium grows best at 35–37 °C and has an optimal pH of 7.6. Haemophilus species are obligate parasites and are part of the normal flora of the human upper respiratory tract.

== Presentation ==
In documented BPF cases, the symptoms include high fever (101.3 °F/38,5 °C or higher), nausea, vomiting, severe abdominal pain, septic shock, and ultimately death. A history of conjunctivitis 30 days prior to the onset of fever was also present in the documented BPF cases. The physical presentation of children infected with BPF include purpuric skin lesions affecting mainly the face and extremities, cyanosis, rapid necrosis of soft tissue, particularly the hands, feet, nose, and ears. Analysis of the fatalities due to BPF showed hemorrhage in the skin, lungs, and adrenal glands. Histopathology showed hemorrhage, intravascular microthrombi and necrosis in the upper dermis, renal glomeruli, lungs, and hepatic sinusoids.

== Risk factors ==
The risk factors associated with BPF are not well known. However, it has been suggested that children under 5 years of age are more susceptible to BPF since they lack serum bactericidal activity against the infection. Older children and adults have much higher titers of bactericidal antibodies, which serve as a protective measure. Also children residing in warmer geographic areas have been associated with a higher risk of BPF infection.

== Transmission ==
The eye gnat (Liohippelates) was thought to be the cause of the conjunctivitis epidemic which occurred in Mato Grosso do Sul in 1991. These gnats were extracted from the conjunctival secretions of the children who were infected with conjunctivitis. 19 of those children developed BPF following the conjunctivitis. Other modes of transmission include contact with the conjunctival discharges of infected people, ophthalmic instruments which have not been properly sterilized, sharing eye makeup applicators or multiple-dose eye medications.

== Pathogenesis ==
The pathogenesis of BPF is not well established but it is thought that patients become pharyngeal or conjunctival carriers of H. aegyptius, which is followed by spreading to the bloodstream. This hypothesis is supported by the isolation of from both the conjunctiva and oropharynx of documented BPF cases with H. aegyptius bacteremia. Possible virulence factors of H. aegyptius include lipooligosaccharides (LOS), capsular polysaccharides, pilus proteins (mediates adhesion to mucosal membrane), immunoglobulin A1 (IgA1), membrane associated proteins, and extracellular proteins. In a study conducted by Barbosa et al., a 60 kilodalton hemagglutinating extracellular product was suggested to be the major pathogenic factor linked to the hemorrhagic manifestations of BPF. This molecule was found to be absorbable by human O-type erythrocytes. After the molecule had been injected into rabbits, they showed reactions similar to that of BPF patients. Further research is being conducted to determine the mechanisms involved with the other virulence factors of H. aegyptius. The overall pathogenesis of BPF probably involves multiple steps and a number of bacterial factors.

== Diagnosis ==
A positive BPF diagnosis includes the clinical symptoms (mainly the fever, purpuric lesions, and rapid progression of the disease), isolation of Haemophilus Influenzae Biogroup aegyptius from blood, and negative laboratory tests for Neisseria meningitidis. The negative tests for Neisseria meningitidis rules out the possibility of the symptoms being caused by meningitis, since the clinical presentations of the two diseases are similar.

== Prevention ==
The basic method for control of the conjunctivitis includes proper hygiene and care for the affected eye. If the conjunctivitis is found to be caused by H. aegyptius Biogroup III then prompt antibiotic treatment preferably with rifampin has been shown to prevent progression to BPF. If the infected person resides in Brazil, it is mandatory that the infection is reported to the health authority so that a proper investigation of the contacts can be completed. This investigation will help to determine the probable source of the infection.

== Treatment ==
It is extremely difficult to successfully treat BPF, mainly because of the difficulty obtaining a proper diagnosis. Since the disease starts out with what seems to be a common case of conjunctivitis, H. aegyptius is not susceptible to the antibiotic eye drops that are being used to treat it. This treatment is ineffective because it treats only the local ocular infection, whereas if it progresses to BPF, systemic antibiotic treatment is required. Although BPF is susceptible to many commonly used antibiotics, including ampicillin, cefuroxime, cefotaxime, rifampin, and chloramphenicol, by the time it is diagnosed the disease has progressed too much to be effectively treated. However, with the fast rate of progression of BPF it is unlikely that it will be successfully treated. With antibiotic therapy, the mortality rate of BPF is around 70%.
