= Herpetosiphon =

Scientific classification
- Domain: Bacteria
- Kingdom: Bacillati
- Phylum: Chloroflexota
- Class: Chloroflexia
- Order: Herpetosiphonales
- Family: Herpetosiphonaceae
- Genus: Herpetosiphon; Holt and Lewin 1968

Type species
- Herpetosiphon aurantiacus Holt & Lewin 1968

Species
- H. aurantiacus; H. geysericola; H. giganteus; H. gulosus; H. llansteffanensis

Genus of bacteria

Herpetosiphon is a genus of bacteria in the family Herpetosiphonaceae. It's species are filamentous and chemoheterotrophic.

== Phylogeny ==
16S rRNA based LTP_10_2024

- Herpetosiphon
  - H. llansteffanensis corrig. Livingstone et al. 2019
  - - H. geysericola (Copeland 1936) Lewin 1970
    - - H. giganteus (Soriano 1945) Reichenbach & Golecki 1975 ex Pan et al. 2017
      - - H. aurantiacus Holt & Lewin 1968
        - H. gulosus Pan et al. 2017

120 marker proteins based GTDB release 10-RS226

- Herpetosiphon
  - - H. aurantiacus
    - H. gulosus
  - - H. geysericola
    - - H. giganteus
      - H. llansteffanensis
