= Haemophilus felis =

Scientific classification
- Domain: Bacteria
- Kingdom: Pseudomonadati
- Phylum: Pseudomonadota
- Class: Gammaproteobacteria
- Order: Pasteurellales
- Family: Pasteurellaceae
- Genus: Haemophilus
- Species: H. felis

Binomial name
- Haemophilus felis Inzana et al., 1999

Species of bacterium

Haemophilus felis is a Gram-negative species of bacterium of the family Pasteurellaceae. A strain of this species was originally isolated from the respiratory tract of a cat with chronic obstructive pulmonary disease, though it was also found in healthy cats. The species may be closely related (on the basis of rpoB sequence) to Pasteurella multocida.
