= Haemophilus aegyptius =

Scientific classification
- Domain: Bacteria
- Kingdom: Pseudomonadati
- Phylum: Pseudomonadota
- Class: Gammaproteobacteria
- Order: Pasteurellales
- Family: Pasteurellaceae
- Genus: Haemophilus
- Species: H. aegyptius

Binomial name
- Haemophilus aegyptius corrig. (Trevisan 1889) Pittman and Davis 1950 (Approved Lists 1980)

Synonyms
- Haemophilus influenzae biogroup aegyptius Brenner et al., 1988

Species of bacterium

Haemophilus aegyptius (synonym Haemophilus influenzae biogroup aegyptius, abbreviated Hae) is a causative agent of acute and often purulent conjunctivitis, more commonly known as pink eye. It was discovered independently by Koch and Weeks in the 1880s.

During the mid-1980s to early 1990s, a highly virulent clonal group of Haemophilus aegyptius, localized in and around the São Paulo state of Brazil, was found to be responsible for Brazilian purpuric fever, an acute septicemic fulminant illness affecting children.

== History ==
=== Discovery and identification by Koch and Weeks ===
Haemophilus aegyptius was first observed by Koch in 1883. Under the German Cholera Commission of Egypt, Koch studied 50 patients in Egypt who were suffering from Egyptian eye disease. He discovered this disease was caused by two bacteria. The first, and more serious strain was caused by a “gonococcus-like organism.” H. aegyptius was the more benign form, however at this point it had not been named. Three years later, Weeks published a paper detailing the essential characteristics of H. aegyptius (see “Characteristics” section below).

=== Taxonomy ===
Neither Koch nor Weeks gave a name for this bacterium, choosing instead to refer to it in relation to the disease it was causing; Weeks’ paper called it “the bacillus of acute conjunctival catarrh.” In 1889, in the first classification treatise naming bacteria under the Latin binomial system, Trevisan listed it as “Bacillus aegyptius.” In the United States, it was listed in 1923 in Bergey’s Manual of Determinative Bacteriology as “Hemophilus conjuntivitidis.” It was listed as “Hemophilus aegyptius” for the first time in the seventh edition of Bergey’s Manual after Pittman and Davis explored and described the characteristic differences between this bacterium and H. influenzae.

=== Relation to Haemophilus influenzae ===
In 1892, Pfeiffer discovered H. influenzae, raising some confusion over whether H. aegyptius was different from H. influenzae. Debate has occurred for more than a century. Pittman, who first gave this bacteria its modern name, felt that these bacteria had enough dissimilarities to be considered a separate species. Others, like Brenner et al. stand by a historical viewpoint that the two species are one and the same, with H. influenzae being the older name, and thus the name with higher priority. These bacteria are curious in that they are phylogenetically one species but differ phenotypically; they share the same historical pattern but have clinical differences. Today, the issue remains unresolved, although scientists have put in a lot of effort to classify this bacteria. So far, no one test standing alone has been able to differentiate these two bacteria; however, through compound efforts of different scientists and different tests scientists have gained a greater understanding of the relationship between these two bacteria. In order to account for both the similarities and differences, H. aegyptius has been classified as a biogroup of H. influenzae.

== Pathology ==
In 1984, 10 children in the town of Promissão in Sao Paulo, Brazil, developed a sudden and severe illness after a recent bout (within the last 30 days) of conjunctivitis – Brazilian Purpuric Fever (BPF). Scientists were able to isolate H. influenzae biogroup aegyptius after studying the blood and cerebrospinal fluids of affected children. After discovering another, and very similar, outbreak in Londrina (located a little under 200 miles from Promissao), scientists determined that a single H. influenzae biogroup aegyptius clone is responsible for all cases of BPF.

In his classic paper, Weeks characterizes H. aegyptius by its high contagiousness, direct transmission from patient to volunteer, pathogenesis, pathology, treatment and epidemiology. It manifests itself most often as BPF in infants and young children, aged 3 months to 8 years. Symptoms of Brazilian Purpuric Fever are usually preceded by purulent conjunctivitis and later include acute, or sudden, onset of high fever, vomiting, abdominal pain, purpura, vascular collapse and death. The overall patient fatality rate since the recognition of BPF is about 70%.

The case definition of Brazilian Purpuric Fever is as follows:

1. An acute illness in a child aged between 3 months to 10 years characterized by:
  1. Fever of 101.3 °F (38.5 °C) or higher
  2. Abdominal pain and/or vomiting
  3. Development of petechiae and/or purpura
  4. No evidence of meningitis
2. History of conjunctivitis within the 30 days preceding the onset of fever
3. At least one of the following two tests negative for Neisseria meningitidis:
  1. Blood cultures taken before antibiotic administration
  2. Serum or urine antigen detection[CDC]

H. influenzae biogroup aegyptius is currently susceptible to a number of antibiotics. These include ampicillin, chloramphenicol, amoxicillin-clavulanic acid, cefamandole, cefuroxime, cefotaxime, tetracycline, ceftriaxone and rifampin. Health officials are hesitant in using systemic antibiotics like rifampin. Although they may help in treating the BPF clone, more studies should be done before this antibiotic is applied to more cases. Premature use of this antibiotic without further studies (and the use of rifampin to treat sporadic cases) could result in a potential development of resistance and excessive expenses.

It is important to distinguish between H. influenzae biogroup aegyptius and the clone referred to as the “BPF clone.” The non-clone, typical version of H. aegyptius manifests itself in non-invasive conjunctivitis. The epidemic nature of this bacteria has been seen in the high frequency of “control” subjects from the affected areas of Brazil that have or had recently had conjunctivitis. These control subjects did not develop Brazilian Purpuric Fever, and therefore were probably not carrying the more dangerous BPF clone of H. influenzae biogroup aegyptius. Affected patients who had recently had conjunctivitis developed a fever and other symptoms of BPF within 1 to 60 days.

== Distribution ==
Historical distribution of H. aegyptius is worldwide. Weeks observed that acute conjunctivitis had been observed in Egypt, France, and England. In 1941, Monteiro Salles reported epidemics of H. aegyptius conjunctivitis in Campinas, Sao Paulo State, Brazil. H. aegyptius conjunctivitis has also been observed in the southern states of the United States [Pittman]. The BPF clone of H. influenzae biogroup aegyptius is more difficult to evaluate. Cases of Brazilian Purpuric Fever have been predominant in the Sao Paulo state. Sao Paulo is one of the most developed states in Brazil, which makes it easier to receive reports of outbreaks of diseases like BPF. However, it is difficult to know whether BPF has affected other, more rural areas of Brazil. Scientists have not yet determined to what extent BPF has affected rural communities because of a lack of communication technology in these areas and a general lack of medical services. A small case study in Serrana has suggested that there is a correlation between day-care attendance and contraction of Brazilian Purpuric Fever. Because children are the main victims of BPF, it is assumed that day care facilities may serve as settings for the transmission of H. influenzae biogroup aegyptius conjunctivitis.

== Seasonal effects ==
For a long time, H. aegyptius has been known to cause seasonal epidemics of acute purulent conjunctivitis (minor cases of pink eye). The harsher effects of Hemophilus aegyptius that typically manifest themselves in Brazilian Purpuric Fever are typically seen during the summer months with few cases of BPF reported during the winter months. Bengtson, while studying H. aegyptius in Georgia, reported that the majority of cases of acute conjunctivitis occurred during the breeding season of the eye gnat, Hippelates pusio.
