= Herpetosiphonaceae =

Scientific classification
- Domain: Bacteria
- Kingdom: Bacillati
- Phylum: Chloroflexota
- Class: Chloroflexia
- Order: Herpetosiphonales
- Family: Herpetosiphonaceae; Gupta et al. 2013

Genus
- "Ca. Anthektikosiphon"; Herpetosiphon

Family of bacteria

Herpetosiphonaceae is a family of bacteria in the order Herpetosiphonales.

== See also ==
- List of bacteria genera
- List of bacterial orders
