= Kluyvera =

Scientific classification
- Domain: Bacteria
- Kingdom: Pseudomonadati
- Phylum: Pseudomonadota
- Class: Gammaproteobacteria
- Order: Enterobacterales
- Family: Enterobacteriaceae
- Genus: Kluyvera; Farmer et al. 1981

Type species
- Kluyvera ascorbata

Species
- K. ascorbata K. cryocrescens K. georgiana K. intermedia

Genus of bacteria

Kluyvera is a Gram negative, facultatively anaerobic bacterial and motile genus from the family of Enterobacteriaceae which have peritrichous flagella. Kluyvera occur in water, soil and sewage. Kluyvera bacteria can cause opportunistic infections in immunocompromised patients.

== Etymology ==
The etymology of this genera is the following : Kluy’ver.a. N.L. fem. n. Kluyvera, named given by Asai et al. in 1956 to honor the Dutch microbiologist A.J. Kluyver.

== Transference of antibiotic resistance ==
In 2010, a gene bla_{CTX-M-15} responsible for coding CTX-M-15 extended-spectrum β-lactamase (ESBL) jumped from its chromosome to its plasmid, which was then shared among several bacteria. ESBL confers resistance to pathogenic bacterial strains. This caused the development of antibiotic resistance in almost all known pathogenic bacteria at that time.
