= Haemophilus parahaemolyticus =

Scientific classification
- Domain: Bacteria
- Kingdom: Pseudomonadati
- Phylum: Pseudomonadota
- Class: Gammaproteobacteria
- Order: Pasteurellales
- Family: Pasteurellaceae
- Genus: Haemophilus
- Species: H. parahaemolyticus

Binomial name
- Haemophilus parahaemolyticus Pittman, 1953

Species of bacterium

Haemophilus parahaemolyticus is a species of anaerobic Gram-negative coccobacilli from the genus Haemophilus identified in 1953 by Dr. Margaret Pittman. The species is known to be pathogenic to humans as well as pigs. H. parahaemolyticus has also been found in the intestines of asymptomatic individuals.
