= Kluyvera ascorbata =

Scientific classification
- Domain: Bacteria
- Kingdom: Pseudomonadati
- Phylum: Pseudomonadota
- Class: Gammaproteobacteria
- Order: Enterobacterales
- Family: Enterobacteriaceae
- Genus: Kluyvera
- Species: K. ascorbata

Binomial name
- Kluyvera ascorbata Farmer et al. 1981

Species of bacterium

Kluyvera ascorbata is a bacterium, the type species of its genus. It is Gram-negative, rod-shaped and motile with peritrichous flagella.
