= Haemophilus haemolyticus =

Scientific classification
- Domain: Bacteria
- Kingdom: Pseudomonadati
- Phylum: Pseudomonadota
- Class: Gammaproteobacteria
- Order: Pasteurellales
- Family: Pasteurellaceae
- Genus: Haemophilus
- Species: H. haemolyticus

Binomial name
- Haemophilus haemolyticus 1923 (Approved Lists 1980)

Species of bacterium

Haemophilus haemolyticus is a species of gram-negative bacteria that is related to Haemophilus influenzae. H. haemolyticus is generally nonpathogenic, however there have been two cases of H.haemolyticus causing endocarditis.

There is active research on H. haemolyticus especially in taxonomy and in identification, e.g.
