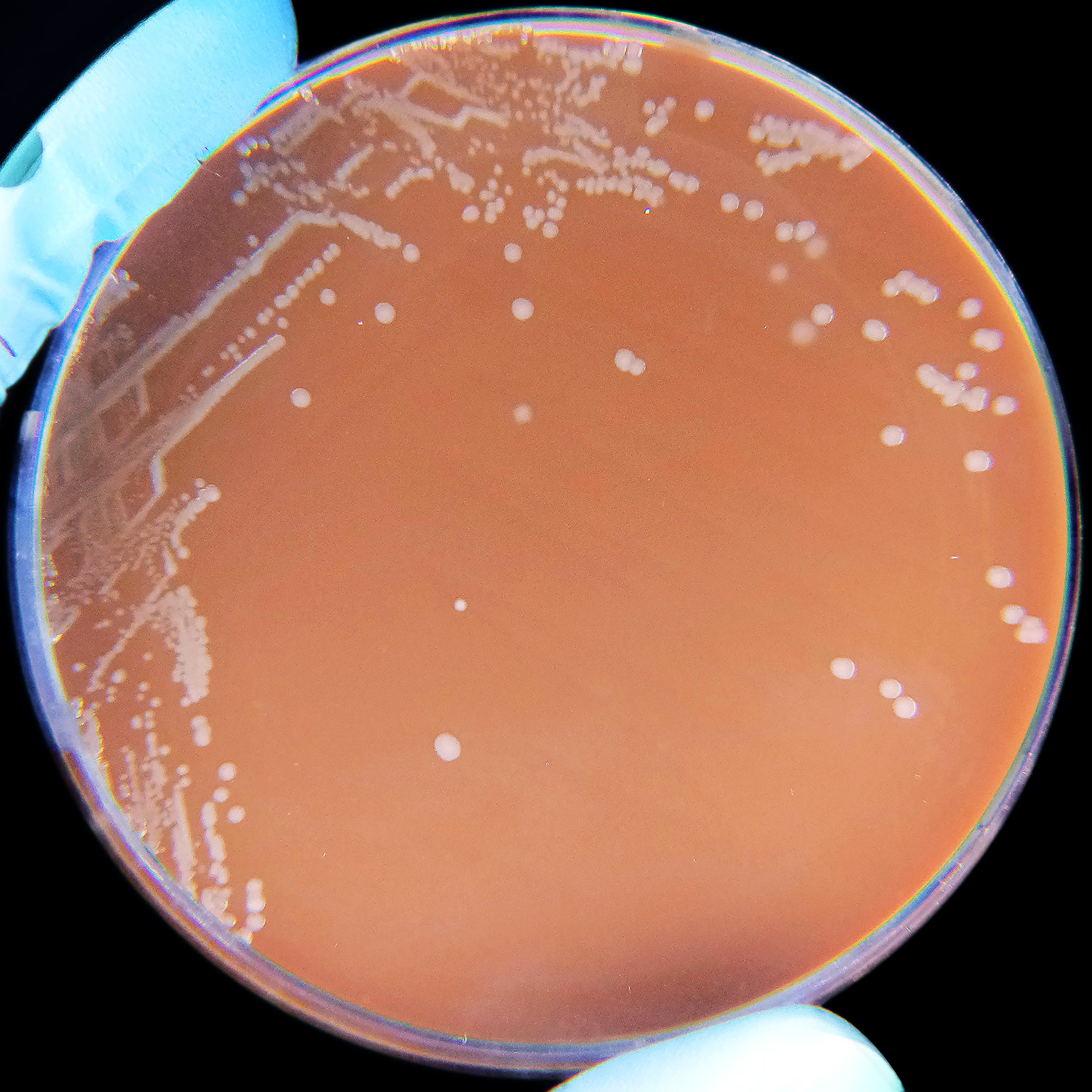
- Haemophilus influenzae on a Chocolate agar plate.

Scientific classification
- Domain: Bacteria
- Kingdom: Pseudomonadati
- Phylum: Pseudomonadota
- Class: Gammaproteobacteria
- Order: Pasteurellales
- Family: Pasteurellaceae
- Genus: Haemophilus; Winslow et al. 1917

Species
- H. aegyptius H. ducreyi H. felis H. haemoglobinophilus H. haemolyticus H. influenzae H. massiliensis H. parainfluenzae H. paracuniculus H. parahaemolyticus H. paraphrohaemolyticus H. piscium H. pittmaniae H. seminalis H. sputorum

= Haemophilus =

Genus of bacteria

Haemophilus is a genus of Gram-negative, pleomorphic, coccobacilli bacteria belonging to the family Pasteurellaceae. While Haemophilus bacteria are typically small coccobacilli, they are categorized as pleomorphic bacteria because of the wide range of shapes they occasionally assume. These organisms inhabit the mucous membranes of the upper respiratory tract, mouth, vagina, and intestinal tract. The genus includes commensal organisms along with some significant pathogenic species such as H. influenzae—a cause of sepsis and bacterial meningitis in young children—and H. ducreyi, the causative agent of chancroid. All members are either aerobic or facultatively anaerobic. This genus has been found to be part of the salivary microbiome.

== Metabolism ==
Most members of the genus Haemophilus require at least one of these blood factors for growth: hemin (sometimes called 'X-factor') and/or nicotinamide adenine dinucleotide (NAD; sometimes called 'V-factor'); they usually will not grow on blood agar plates. While NAD is released into blood agar by red blood cells, hemin is bound to the blood cells and is unavailable to bacteria in this medium which prevents the growth of many Haemophilus species. They are unable to synthesize important parts of the cytochrome system needed for respiration, and they obtain these substances from the heme fraction of blood hemoglobin. Clinical laboratories use tests for the hemin and NAD requirement to identify the isolates as Haemophilus species. The species Haemophilus haemoglobinophilus is an exception to this, as it has been shown to grow well on both blood and chocolate agars.

Chocolate agar is an excellent Haemophilus growth medium, as it allows for increased accessibility to these factors. Alternatively, Haemophilus is sometimes cultured using the "Staph streak" technique: both Staphylococcus and Haemophilus organisms are cultured together on a single blood agar plate. In this case, Haemophilus colonies will frequently grow in small "satellite" colonies around the larger Staphylococcus colonies because the metabolism of Staphylococcus produces the necessary blood factor byproducts required for Haemophilus growth.

Strain	Needs hemin	Needs NAD	Hemolysis on HB/Rabbit blood
H. aegyptius	+	+	–
H. ducreyi	+	–	–
H. influenzae	+	+	–
H. haemolyticus	+	+	+
H. parainfluenzae	–	+	–
H. parahaemolyticus	–	+	+
