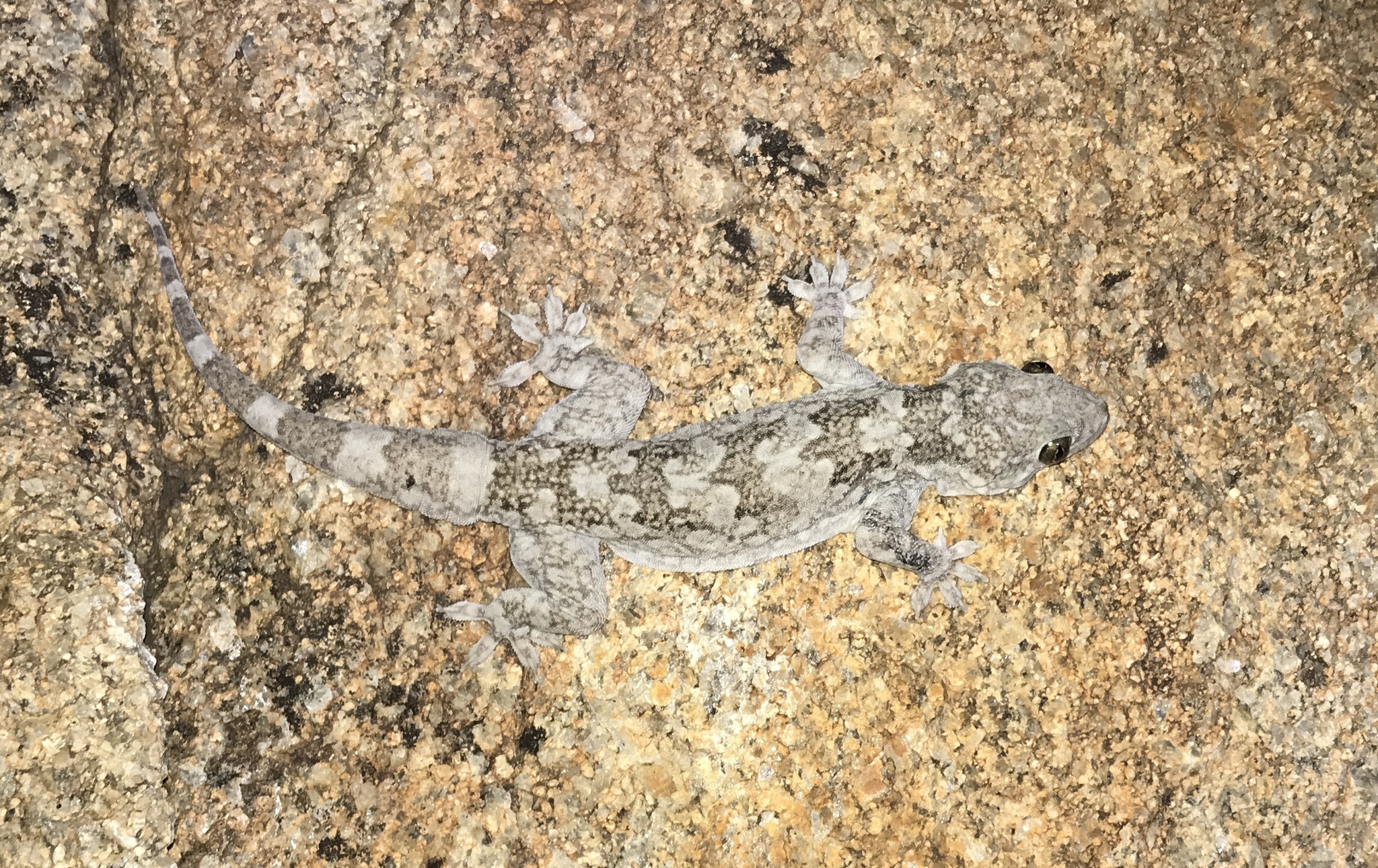

Conservation status
- Least Concern (IUCN 3.1)

Scientific classification
- Kingdom: Animalia
- Phylum: Chordata
- Class: Reptilia
- Order: Squamata
- Suborder: Gekkota
- Family: Gekkonidae
- Genus: Hemidactylus
- Species: H. giganteus

Binomial name
- Hemidactylus giganteus Stoliczka, 1871

= Hemidactylus giganteus =

Species of lizard

Hemidactylus giganteus, also known as the giant leaf-toed gecko, the giant southern tree gecko, or the giant gecko, is a species of gecko endemic to India.

== Description ==
Snout longer than the distance between the eye and the ear-opening, 1.5 times the diameter of the orbit; forehead concave; ear-opening rather large, suboval, vertical. Body and limbs stout. Digits free, inner well developed, strongly dilated; with straight transverse lamella beneath; 11 or 12 under the inner digits, 13 to 15 under the median. Upper surfaces covered with uniform small granular scales, somewhat larger on the snout, smallest on the hinder part of the head. Rostral quadrangular, not quite twice as broad as deep; nostril pierced between the rostral and three nasals;12 to 15 upper and 11 to 13 lower labials; mental large, pentagonal; two pairs of chin-shields, the inner the larger. Abdominal scales rather small, cycloid, imbricate. Male with a series of femoral pores interrupted mesially; 19 to 22 pores on each side. Tail without large tubercles. Olive-grey above, with irregular dark, pale-edged marks in imperfect circles, tending to form, or forming, 4 or 5 transverse undulating bands on the body; below uniform white. From snout to vent 4.8 inches.

== Distribution ==
Godavari Valley and Malabar. Found on trees, mainly near water sources. found in northern Andhra pradesh, India. Type locality: near Badhrachalam, Godavari Valley
