= Thermomicrobia =

Scientific classification
- Domain: Bacteria
- Kingdom: Pseudomonadati
- Phylum: Thermomicrobiota; Garrity and Holt 2021
- Class: Thermomicrobia; Garrity and & Holt 2002

Orders
- Sphaerobacterales; Thermomicrobiales

Synonyms
- Thermomicrobia: "Thermomicrobia" Garrity and Holt 2001; "Thermomicrobiota" Whitman et al. 2018; "Thermomicrobaeota" Oren et al. 2015

Group of bacteria

The Thermomicrobia is a group of thermophilic green non-sulfur bacteria. Based on species Thermomicrobium roseum (type species) and Sphaerobacter thermophilus, this bacteria class has the following description:

The class Thermomicrobia subdivides into two orders with validly published names: Thermomicrobiales Garrity and Holt 2001 and Sphaerobacterales Stackebrandt, Rainey and Ward-Rainey 1997. Gram negative. Pleomorphic, non-motile, non-spore-forming rods. Non-sporulating. No diamino acid present. No peptidoglycan in significant amount. Atypical proteinaceous cell walls. Hyper-thermophilic, optimum growth temperature at 70-75 °C. Obligatory aerobic and chemoorganotrophic. (Note: The above description does not take newly discovered species after 2004 into account.)

As thermophilic bacteria, members of this class are usually found in environments which are distant from human activity. However, they have features like improved growth in antibiotics and CO oxidizing activity, making them interesting topics of research (e.g. for biotechnology application).

== History ==
In 1973, a strain of rose-pink thermophilic bacteria was isolated from Toadstool Spring in Yellowstone National Park, which was later named Thermomicrobium roseum and proposed as a novel species of the novel genus Thermomicrobium. At that time the genus was categorized under family Achromobacteraceae, but it became a distinct phylum by 2001.

In 2004, it was proposed, on the basis of an analysis of genetic affiliations, that the Thermomicrobia should more properly be reclassified as a class belonging to the phylum Chloroflexota (formerly Chloroflexi). The bacteria Sphaerobacter thermophilus originally described as an Actinobacteria is now considered a Thermomicrobia. In the same year, another strain of rose-pink thermophilic bacteria was isolated from Yellowstone National Park, which was named Thermobaculum terrenum. Later analysis based on genome put this species under Thermomicrobia class. However, the current standing of Thermobaculum terrenum is disputed.

In 2012, a thermo-tolerant nitrite-oxidizing bacterium was isolated from a bioreactor, which was named Nitrolancetus hollandica and proposed as a novel species later in 2014. While it has nitrite-oxidizing activity, which is unique in the Thermomicrobia class, it is placed under the Thermomicrobia class based on 16s rRNA phylogeny.

In 2014, two thermophilic, Gram-positive, rod-shaped, non-spore-forming bacteria (strains KI3^{T} and KI4^{T}) isolated from geothermally heated biofilms growing on a tumulus in the Kilauea Iki pit crater on the flank of Kilauea Volcano (Hawaiʻi) were proposed as representatives of new species based on 16s rRNA phylogeny. The KI3^{T} strain, later named as Thermomicrobium carboxidum, is closely related to Thermomicrobium roseum. The KI4^{T} strain, later named as Thermorudis peleae, was proposed as a type strain of new genus Thermorudis.

In 2015, a thermophilic bacteria strain WKT50.2 isolated from geothermal soil in Waitike (New Zealand) was proposed to be a novel species, later named Thermorudis pharmacophila. Phylogenic analysis based on 16s rRNA place it within Thermomicrobia class, as close relative to Thermorudis peleae.

== Characteristics ==
=== Living environment ===
Members of the class Thermomicrobia are broadly distributed across a wide range of both aquatic and terrestrial habitats. Thermomicrobium roseum was found in geothermally heated hot springs, Thermorudis pharmacophila and Thermobaculum terrenum from heated soils, and Thermomicrobium carboxidum and Thermorudis peleae from heated sediments In addition, Sphaerobacter thermophilus was found in sewage sludge that went through thermophilic treatment. The common features of their habitats include temperature ranging from around 65~75 °C and a pH around 6.0~8.0 (except for Nitrolancea hollandica which grow around 40 °C).

=== Metabolism ===
Members of Thermomicrobia class have variation in their basic metabolism. Nitrolancetus hollandica has nitrifying activity that utilize NO_{2}^{−} as energy source, which is unique in the whole Chloroflexota phylum. Thermomicrobium spp. and Sphaerobacter thermophilus have constitutive CO oxidizing not found in other species in this class. However, species of this class do share some features, as listed below:

- All members except Thermobaculum terrenum have inability to utilize some common monosaccharides (e.g. glucose, fructose, etc.) as sole carbon source. The mechanisms behind this inability are currently unknown.

=== Antibiotic resistance ===
Members of Thermomicrobia class exhibit certain level of resistance against metronidazole and/or trimethoprim, which are clinically relevant for humans. Thermomicrobium carboxidum and Thermorudis peleae show resistance against both of those antibiotics, while Sphaerobacter thermophilus shows resistance against only metronidazole. Interestingly, Thermomicrobium roseum and Thermorudis pharmacophila have an increased growth in both metronidazole and trimethoprim, a rare trait even within antibiotic resistant bacteria. The mechanisms behind are currently undocumented, and further study is required on this topic.

=== Cell envelope structure ===
Members of Thermomicrobia class have various Gram-staining results. Thermomicrobium roseum, Sphaerobacter thermophilus and Thermorudis pharmacophila are reported to be Gram-negative and have a typical layered diderm cell envelope structure. However, their cell envelope composition are atypical compared to typical Gram-negative bacteria. Cell envelope of Thermomicrobium roseum lacks significant amount of peptidoglycan, which is fundamental for typical Gram-negative bacteria, while being rich in protein. Membrane lipids of Thermomicrobium roseum are mostly long chain diols instead of glycerol-based lipids commonly found in bacteria. The same feature was found in Sphaerobacter thermophilus and Thermorudis pharmacophila. It was suggested that the high-protein and diol-based lipid composition are responsible for heat resistance of these bacteria.

Meanwhile, other members of Thermomicrobia class are reported to be Gram-positive and have typical monoderm cell envelope. There are some possible explanations of the inconsistency of Gram-staining result within the class. For Thermorudis pharmacophila, a possible explanation suggested by Houghton et al. is that it is actually an atypical monoderm bacterium, because its cell envelope contains amino acids usually associated with Gram-positive bacteria, have reaction to KOH, vancomycin and ampicillin, and lacks genes responsible for diderm formation. It is also suggested that further study is required to resolve this problem, since the inconsistent reports of cell envelope structure are found for the whole Chloroflexota phylum.

== Phylogeny ==
16S rRNA based LTP_10_2024

- Thermomicrobia
  - - Sphaerobacterales
      - Sphaerobacteraceae
        Sphaerobacter
  - - Nitrolancea
    - - Thermomicrobiales
        - Thermomicrobiaceae
          - Thermalbibacter
          - - Thermomicrobium
            - Thermorudis

120 marker proteins based GTDB 10-RS226

- Thermomicrobiales
  - Thermomicrobiaceae
    - - Nitrolancea
      - Sphaerobacter
    - - Thermalbibacter
      - - Thermomicrobium
        - Thermorudis

== Taxonomy ==
The currently accepted taxonomy is based on the List of Prokaryotic names with Standing in Nomenclature (LPSN) and National Center for Biotechnology Information (NCBI).

- Order Sphaerobacterales Stackebrandt, Rainey & Ward-Rainey 1997
  - Family Sphaerobacteraceae Stackebrandt, Rainey & Ward-Rainey 1997
    - Genus Sphaerobacter Demharter et al. 1989
      - S. thermophilus Demharter et al. 1989
    - Genus Nitrolancea Sorokin et al. 2014 (Note: Strain found at the National Center for Biotechnology Information (NCBI) but has no standing with the Bacteriological Code (1990 and subsequent Revision) as detailed by List of Prokaryotic names with Standing in Nomenclature (LPSN) as a result of the following reasons: No pure culture isolated or available for prokaryotes.; Not validly published because the effective publication only documents deposit of the type strain in a single recognized culture collection.; Not approved and published by the International Journal of Systematic Bacteriology or the International Journal of Systematic and Evolutionary Microbiology (IJSB/IJSEM).)
      - N. hollandica Sorokin et al. 2014
      - "Ca. N. copahuensis" Spieck et al. 2020
- Order Thermomicrobiales Garrity & Holt 2002
  - Family Thermomicrobiaceae Garrity & Holt 2002
    - Genus Thermalbibacter Zhao et al. 2023
      - T. longus Zhao et al. 2023
    - Genus Thermomicrobium Jackson, Ramaley & Meinschein 1973
      - T. carboxidum King & King 2014
      - T. roseum Jackson, Ramaley & Meinschein 1973
    - Genus Thermorudis King & King 2014
      - T. peleae King & King 2014
      - T. pharmacophila Houghton et al. 2015

== See also ==
- List of bacteria genera
- List of bacterial orders
