= Sphaerobacter =

Scientific classification
- Domain: Bacteria
- Kingdom: Pseudomonadati
- Phylum: Thermomicrobiota
- Class: Thermomicrobia
- Order: Sphaerobacterales
- Family: Sphaerobacteraceae
- Genus: Sphaerobacter; Demharter et al. 1989
- Species: S. thermophilus

Binomial name
- Sphaerobacter thermophilus Demharter et al. 1989

Genus of bacteria

Sphaerobacter is a genus of bacteria. When originally described it was placed in its own subclass (Sphaerobacteridae) within the class Actinomycetota. Subsequently, phylogenetic studies have now placed it in the order Sphaerobacterales within the phylum Thermomicrobiota. Up to now there is only one species of this genus known (Sphaerobacter thermophilus). The closest related cultivated organism to S. thermophilus is Thermomicrobium roseum with an 87% sequence similarity which indicates that S. thermophilus is one of the most isolated bacterial species.
