= Herpetosiphonales =

Scientific classification
- Domain: Bacteria
- Kingdom: Bacillati
- Phylum: Chloroflexota
- Class: Chloroflexia
- Order: Herpetosiphonales; Gupta et al. 2013

Families
- Herpetosiphonaceae

Order of bacteria

Herpetosiphonales is an order of bacteria in the class Chloroflexia.

== See also ==
- List of bacteria genera
- List of bacterial orders
