= Chloroflexia =

Scientific classification
- Domain: Bacteria
- Kingdom: Bacillati
- Phylum: Chloroflexota
- Class: Chloroflexia corrig. Gupta et al. 2013

Orders
- Chloroflexales; Herpetosiphonales; Kallotenuales; "Thermobaculales"

Synonyms
- "Chloroflexia" Castenholz 2001; "Chlorobacteria" Cavalier-Smith 2002; "Chloroflexi" Gupta et al. 2013

Class of bacteria

The Chloroflexia are a class of bacteria in the phylum Chloroflexota. Chloroflexia are typically filamentous, and can move about through bacterial gliding. It is named after the order Chloroflexales.

== Etymology ==
The name "Chloroflexi" is a Neolatin plural of "Chloroflexus", which is the name of the first genus described. The noun is a combination of the Greek chloros (χλωρός) meaning "greenish-yellow" and the Latin flexus (of flecto) meaning "bent" to mean "a green bending". The name is not due to chlorine, an element confirmed as such in 1810 by Sir Humphry Davy and named after its pale green colour.

== Taxonomy and molecular signatures ==
The Chloroflexia class is a group of deep branching photosynthetic bacteria (with the exception of Herpetosiphon and Kallotenue species) that currently consist of three orders: Chloroflexales, Herpetosiphonales, and Kallotenuales. The Herpetosiphonales and Kallotenuales each consist of a single genus within its own family, Herpetosiphonaceae (Herpetosiphon) and Kallotenuaceae (Kallotenue), respectively, whereas the Chloroflexales are more phylogenetically diverse.

=== Microscopic distinguishing characteristics ===
Members of the phylum Chloroflexota are monoderms and stain mostly Gram negative, whereas most bacteria species are diderms and stain Gram negative, with the Gram positive exceptions of the Bacillota (low GC Gram positives), Actinomycetota (high GC, Gram positives), and the Deinococcota (Gram positive, diderms with thick peptidoglycan).

=== Genetic distinguishing characteristics ===
Comparative genomic analysis has recently refined the taxonomy of the class Chloroflexia, dividing the Chloroflexales into the suborder Chloroflexineae consisting of the families Oscillachloridaceae and Chloroflexaceae, and the suborder Roseiflexineae containing family Roseiflexaceae. The revised taxonomy was based on the identification of a number of conserved signature indels (CSIs) which serve as highly reliable molecular markers of shared ancestry.

=== Physiological distinguishing characteristics ===
Additional support for the division of the Chloroflexales into two suborders is the observed differences in physiological characteristics where each suborder is characterized by distinct carotenoids, quinones, and fatty acid profiles that are consistently absent in the other suborder.

In addition to demarcating taxonomic ranks, CSIs may play a role in the unique characteristics of members within the clade: In particular, a four-amino-acid insert in the protein pyruvate flavodoxin/ferredoxin oxidoreductase, a protein which plays important roles in photosynthetic organisms, has been found exclusively among all members in the genus Chloroflexus, and is thought to play an important functional role.

Additional work has been done using CSIs to demarcate the phylogenetic position of Chloroflexia relative to other photosynthetic groups such as the Cyanobacteria. Chloroflexia shares a number of CSIs with Chlorobiota in the chlorophyll-synthesizing proteins. As the two lineages are not otherwise closely related, the interpretation is that the CSIs are the result of a horizontal gene transfer event between the two. Chloroflexia in turn acquired these proteins by another HGT from a "Clade C" marine cyanobacteria.

=== Phylogeny ===
16S rRNA based LTP_10_2024

- - "Thermomicrobiia"
    - - Sphaerobacterales
        - Sphaerobacteraceae
          Sphaerobacter
    - - Nitrolancea
      - - Thermomicrobiales
          - Thermomicrobiaceae
            - Thermalbibacter
            - - Thermomicrobium
              - Thermorudis
  - Chloroflexia
    - - Kallotenuales
        - Kallotenuaceae
          Kallotenue
      - Herpetosiphonales
        - Herpetosiphonaceae
          Herpetosiphon
    - - Chloroflexales
        - Roseiflexaceae
          Roseiflexus
        - Chloroflexaceae
          - Heliothrix
          - - Oscillochloris
            - Chloroflexus

120 marker proteins based GTDB release 10-RS226

- Chloroflexia
  - - - "Chloroheliales"
        - "Chloroheliaceae"
          Chlorohelix
    - - "Thermobaculales"
        - "Thermobaculaceae"
          Thermobaculum
      - Thermomicrobiales
        - Thermomicrobiaceae
          - - Nitrolancea
            - Sphaerobacter
          - - Thermalbibacter
            - - Thermomicrobium
              - Thermorudis
  - - Chloroflexales
      - - Kallotenuaceae
          Kallotenue
        - Herpetosiphonaceae
          Herpetosiphon
      - - Roseiflexaceae
          - Roseiflexus
          - - "Ca. Ribeiella"
            - "Kouleothrix"
        - Chloroflexaceae
          - Chloroflexus
          - - Oscillochloris
            - - "Ca. Chloroploca"
              - "Ca. Viridilinea"

=== Taxonomy ===
The currently accepted taxonomy is as follows:

Class Chloroflexia Gupta et al. 2013

- Genus ?"Dehalobium" Wu et al. 2002
- Genus ?"Candidatus Lithoflexus" Saghai et al. 2020
- Genus ?"Candidatus Sarcinithrix" Nierychlo et al. 2019
- Order "Chloroheliales" Tsuji et al. 2024
  - Family "Chloroheliaceae" Tsuji et al. 2024
    - Genus "Candidatus Chlorohelix" Tsuji et al. 2024
- Order "Thermobaculales" Chuvochina et al. 2023
  - Family "Thermobaculaceae" Chuvochina et al. 2023
    - Genus "Thermobaculum" Botero et al. 2004
- Order Kallotenuales Cole et al. 2013
  - Family Kallotenuaceae Cole et al. 2013
    - Genus Kallotenue Cole et al. 2013
- Order Herpetosiphonales Gupta et al. 2013
  - Family Herpetosiphonaceae Gupta et al. 2013
    - Genus ?"Candidatus Anthektikosiphon" Ward, Fischer & McGlynn 2020
    - Genus Herpetosiphon Holt & Lewin 1968
- Order Chloroflexales Gupta et al. 2013
  - Suborder Roseiflexineae Gupta et al. 2013
    - Family Roseiflexaceae Gupta et al. 2013 ["Kouleotrichaceae" Mehrshad et al. 2018]
      - Genus ?"Candidatus Amarofilum" Petriglieri et al. 2023
      - Genus ?Heliothrix Pierson et al. 1986
      - Genus "Kouleothrix" Kohno et al. 2002
      - Genus "Candidatus Ribeiella" Petriglieri et al. 2023
      - Genus Roseiflexus Hanada et al. 2002
  - Suborder Chloroflexineae Gupta et al. 2013
    - Family Chloroflexaceae Gupta et al. 2013
      - Genus ?"Candidatus Chloranaerofilum" Thiel et al. 2016
      - Genus Chloroflexus Pierson & Castenholz 1974 ["Chlorocrinis"Ward et al. 1998]
    - Family Oscillochloridaceae Gupta et al. 2013
      - Genus ?Chloronema ♪ Dubinina & Gorlenko 1975
      - Genus "Candidatus Chloroploca" Gorlenko et al. 2014
      - Genus Oscillochloris Gorlenko & Pivovarova 1989
      - Genus "Candidatus Viridilinea" Grouzdev et al. 2018

== See also ==
- List of bacteria genera
- List of bacterial orders
- Green sulfur bacteria
