= Dehalococcoidia =

Scientific classification
- Domain: Bacteria
- Kingdom: Bacillati
- Phylum: Chloroflexota
- Class: Dehalococcoidia; Löffler et al. 2013

Order
- Dehalococcoidales; "Monstramarinales"

Synonyms
- "Dehalococcoidetes" Hugenholtz and Stackebrandt 2004

Class of bacteria

Dehalococcoidia is a class of Chloroflexota, a phylum of Bacteria. It is also known as the DHC group.

The name Dehalococcoidetes is a placeholder name given by Hugenholtz and Stackebrandt, 2004, after Dehalococcoides ethenogenes, a partially described species in 1997, whereas the first species fully described belonging to this class was Dehalogenimonas lykanthroporepellens by Moe et al. 2009, but no emendations to the name were made.

== Characteristics ==
Both species, Dehalococcoides ethenogenes and Dehalogenimonas lykanthroporepellens are irregular coccus (coccoid) bacteria capable of dehalogenating polychlorinated aliphatic alkanes and alkenes, such as tetrachloroethene, trichloropropane, trichloroethane, dichloropropane, and dichloroethane.

One of the features of the members of the phylum Chloroflexota is the unusual cell wall structure, which is monoderm but with great variation in presence or structure of the peptidoglycan resulting in many members staining Gram-negative and other Gram-positive. Both species of Dehalococcoidetes stain Gram negative, but they potentially lack peptidoglycan and instead possess pseudopeptidoglycan (S-layer) (resistant to peptidoglycan-attacking antibiotics ampicillin and vancomycin; wheat germ agglutinin does not bind nor does lysozyme work).

== Phylogeny ==
16S rRNA based LTP_07_2026

- - Tepidiformia
    - Tepidiformales
      Tepidiformaceae
  - Dehalococcoidia
    - Dehalococcoidales
      Dehalococcoidaceae

120 marker proteins based GTDB release 11-RS232

- Dehalococcoidia
  - - "Bathosphaerales"
      "Bathosphaeraceae"
    - Tepidiformales
      Tepidiformaceae
  - - Dehalococcoidales
      Dehalococcoidaceae
    - "Monstramarinales"
      - "Lucifugimonadaceae"
      - - "Australimonadaceae"
        - "Monstrimarinaceae" [UBA3495]

=== Taxonomy ===
The currently accepted taxonomy is based on the List of Prokaryotic names with Standing in Nomenclature (LPSN) and National Center for Biotechnology Information (NCBI).

- Class "Bathosphaeria" Mehrshad et al. 2018
  - Order "Bathosphaerales" Mehrshad et al. 2018 [UBA2979]
    - Family "Bathosphaeraceae" Mehrshad et al. 2018 [UBA2979]
- Class Tepidiformia Kochetkova et al. 2020
  - Order Tepidiformales Kochetkova et al. 2020
    - Family Tepidiformaceae Kochetkova et al. 2020
- Class "Monstrimarinia" corrig. Landry et al. 2017 (SAR202)
  - Order "Lucifugimonadales" Lim et al. 2023
    - Family "Lucifugimonadaceae" Lim et al. 2023
  - Order "Australimonadales" Prabhu et al. 2024
    - Family "Australimonadaceae" Prabhu et al. 2024
  - Order "Monstramarinales" corrig. Landry et al. 2017
    - Family "Monstrimarinaceae" corrig. Landry et al. 2017 [UBA3495]
- Class Dehalococcoidia Löffler et al. 2013
  - Order Dehalococcoidales Löffler et al. 2013
    - Family Dehalococcoidaceae Löffler et al. 2013

== See also ==
- Bioaugmentation
- List of bacterial orders
- List of bacteria genera
