= Sphaerobacteraceae =

Scientific classification
- Domain: Bacteria
- Kingdom: Pseudomonadati
- Phylum: Thermomicrobiota
- Class: Thermomicrobia
- Order: Sphaerobacterales; Stackebrandt et al. 1997
- Family: Sphaerobacteraceae; Stackebrandt et al. 1997

Genera
- Nitrolancea Sorokin et al. 2014; Sphaerobacter Demharter et al. 1989

Family of bacteria

Sphaerobacteraceae is a family of bacteria. It is the only family in the order Sphaerobacterales.

Genera:

- Nitrolancea Sorokin et al. 2014
- Sphaerobacter Demharter et al. 1989
