= Chloroflexales =

Scientific classification
- Domain: Bacteria
- Kingdom: Bacillati
- Phylum: Chloroflexota
- Class: Chloroflexia
- Order: Chloroflexales; Gupta et al. 2013

Families
- Chloroflexineae; Chloroflexaceae; Oscillochloridaceae; Roseiflexineae; Roseiflexaceae

Order of bacteria

Chloroflexales is an order of bacteria in the class Chloroflexia. The clade is also known as filamentous anoxygenic phototrophic bacteria (FAP), as the order contains phototrophs that do not produce oxygen. These bacteria are facultative aerobic. They generally use chemotrophy when oxygen is present and switch to light-derived energy when otherwise. Most species are heterotrophs, but a few are capable of photoautotrophy.

The order can be divided into two suborders. Chloroflexineae ("Green FAP", "green non-sulfur bacteria") is the better-known one. This suborder uses chlorosomes, a specialized antenna complex, to pass light energy to the reaction center. Roseiflexineae ("Red FAP") on the other hand has no such ability. The named colors are not absolute, as growth conditions such as oxygen concentration will make a green FAP appear green, brown, or reddish-orange by inducing changes in pigment composition.

== Classification ==
The currently accepted taxonomy is based on the List of Prokaryotic names with Standing in Nomenclature (LPSN) and National Center for Biotechnology Information (NCBI).

=== Phylogeny ===
16S rRNA based LTP_10_2024

- - - Kallotenuales
      - Kallotenuaceae
        Kallotenue
    - Herpetosiphonales
      - Herpetosiphonaceae
        Herpetosiphon
  - - Chloroflexales
      - Roseiflexaceae
        Roseiflexus
      - Chloroflexaceae
        - Heliothrix
        - - Oscillochloris
          - Chloroflexus

120 marker proteins based GTDB release 10-RS226

- Chloroflexales
  - - Kallotenuaceae
      Kallotenue
    - Herpetosiphonaceae
      Herpetosiphon
  - - Roseiflexaceae
      - Roseiflexus
      - - "Ca. Ribeiella"
        - "Kouleothrix"
    - Chloroflexaceae
      - Chloroflexus
      - - Oscillochloris
        - - "Ca. Chloroploca"
          - "Ca. Viridilinea"

=== Taxonomy ===
- Suborder Roseiflexineae Gupta et al. 2013
  - Family Roseiflexaceae Gupta et al. 2013 ["Kouleotrichaceae" Mehrshad et al. 2018]
    - Genus ?"Candidatus Amarofilum" Petriglieri et al. 2023
    - Genus ?Heliothrix Pierson et al. 1986
    - Genus "Kouleothrix" Kohno et al. 2002
    - Genus "Candidatus Ribeiella" Petriglieri et al. 2023
    - Genus Roseiflexus Hanada et al. 2002
- Suborder Chloroflexineae Gupta et al. 2013
  - Family Chloroflexaceae Gupta et al. 2013
    - Genus ?"Candidatus Chloranaerofilum" Thiel et al. 2016
    - Genus Chloroflexus Pierson & Castenholz 1974 ["Chlorocrinis" Ward et al. 1998]
  - Family Oscillochloridaceae Gupta et al. 2013
    - Genus ?Chloronema ♪ Dubinina & Gorlenko 1975
    - Genus "Candidatus Chloroploca" Gorlenko et al. 2014
    - Genus Oscillochloris Gorlenko & Pivovarova 1989
    - Genus "Candidatus Viridilinea" Grouzdev et al. 2018

== See also ==
- List of bacteria genera
- List of bacterial orders
