= Chloroflexota =

Scientific classification
- Domain: Bacteria
- Kingdom: Bacillati
- Phylum: Chloroflexota; Garrity and Holt 2021

Classes
- Anaerolineae; Ardenticatenia; Caldilineae; Chloroflexia; Dehalococcoidia; Ktedonobacteria; Tepidiformia; Thermoflexia; Candidatus classes: "Bathosphaeria"; "Limnocylindria"; "Martimicrobia"; "Monstramaria"; "Poriflexia"; "Spiritibacteria"; "Tarhunnaeia"; "Uliximicrobia"; "Umbricyclopia"; Sometimes included: Thermomicrobiia

Synonyms
- "Chlorobacteria" Cavalier-Smith 2006; "Chloroflexi" Garrity and Holt 2001; "Eobacteria" Cavalier-Smith 2002; "Chloroflexota" Whitman et al. 2018; "Chloroflexaeota" Oren et al. 2015; Thermomicrobiota Oren & Garrity 2021

Phylum of bacteria

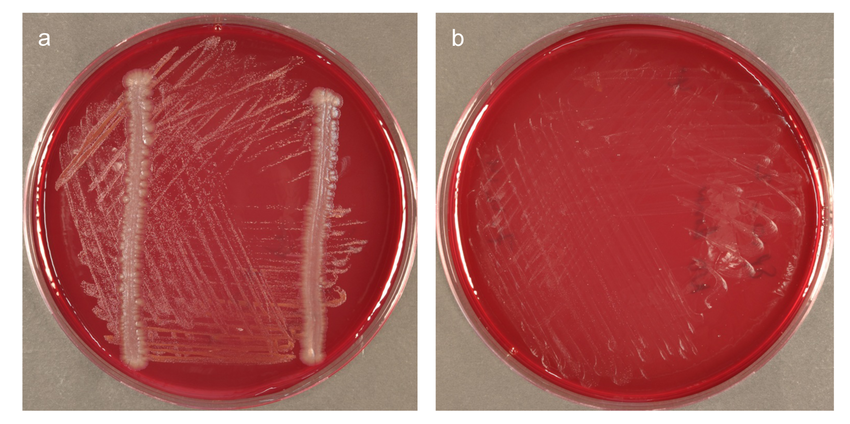
Chloroflexota: class Anaerolinaea

The Chloroflexota are a phylum of bacteria largely described as green non-sulfur bacteria. The phylum contains classes with a diverse range of phenotypes, including members that are aerobic thermophiles, which use oxygen and grow well in high temperatures; anoxygenic phototrophs, which use light for photosynthesis; and anaerobic halorespirers, which uses halogenated organics (such as the toxic chlorinated ethenes and polychlorinated biphenyls) as electron acceptors.

The phylum consists of eight distinct classes: Anaerolinae, Ardenticatenia, Caldilineae, Chloroflexia, Dehalococcoidia, Ktedonobacteria, Tepidiformia and Thermoflexia.

The members of the phylum Chloroflexota are monoderms (that is, have one cell membrane with no outer membrane), but species stain both gram positive and gram negative. Many well-studied phyla of bacteria are diderms and stain gram-negative, whereas well-known monoderms that stain Gram-positive include Firmicutes (or Bacillota) (low G+C gram-positives) and Actinomycetota (high-G+C gram-positives).

== History ==
The taxon name Chloroflexi was created in the 2001 edition of Volume 1 of Bergey's Manual of Systematic Bacteriology and is the Latin plural of the name Chloroflexus, the name of the type genus of the phylum, a common practice. The phylum is now recognised as the Chloroflexota.

In 1987, Carl Woese, regarded as one of the forerunner of the molecular phylogeny revolution, had divided Eubacteria into 10 phyla based on 16S ribosomal RNA (SSU) sequences and grouped the genera Chloroflexus, Herpetosiphon and Thermomicrobium into the "green non-sulfur bacteria and relatives". The genera were placed in orders Chloroflexales and Herpetosiphonales, both placed in phylum Chloroflexi, and order Thermomicrobiales in phylum Thermomicrobia in Volume One of Bergey's Manual of Systematic Bacteriology.

Chloroflexi, being a deep branching phylum (see Bacterial phyla), was considered in Volume One of Bergey's Manual of Systematic Bacteriology to include a single class with the same name. Since 2001, however, new classes have been created thanks to newly discovered species, and the phylum is now divided several classes.

"Dehalococcoidetes" was a placeholder name given by Hugenholtz & Stackebrandt, 2004, after "Dehalococcoides ethenogenes" a species partially described in 1997. The first species fully described was Dehalogenimonas lykanthroporepellens, by Moe et al. 2009, but in the description of that species the class was not made official nor were families or orders laid out as the two species share only 90% 16S ribosomal RNA identity, meaning that they could fall in different families or even orders. This class is now recognised as Dehalococcoidia

Recent phylogenetic analysis of the Chloroflexota has found very weak support for the grouping together of the different classes currently part of the phylum. The six classes that make up the phylum did not consistently form a well-supported clade in phylogenetic trees based on concatenated sequences for large datasets of proteins, and no conserved signature indels were identified that were uniquely shared by the entire phylum. However, the classes Chloroflexi and Thermomicrobia were found to group together consistently by both the usual phylogenetic means and the identification of shared conserved signature indels in the 50S ribosomal protein L19 and the enzyme UDP-glucose 4-epimerase. It has been suggested that the phylum Chloroflexi sensu stricto should comprise only the classes Chloroflexi and Thermomicrobia, and the other four classes ("Dehalococcoidetes," Anaerolineae, Caldilineae and Ktedonobacteria) may represent one or more independent phyla branching in the neighborhood of the Chloroflexi.

The LPSN currently recognise eight classees:

- Anaerolineae Yamada et al. 2006
- Ardenticatenia Kawaichi et al. 2013
- Caldilineae Yamada et al. 2006
- Chloroflexia corrig. Gupta et al. 2013 (formerly class Chloroflexi)
- Dehalococcoidia Löffler et al. 2013
- Ktedonobacteria corrig. Cavaletti et al. 2007
- Tepidiformia Kochetkova et al. 2020
- Thermoflexia Dodsworth et al. 2014

== Phylogeny ==
The currently accepted taxonomy is based on the List of Prokaryotic names with Standing in Nomenclature (LPSN) and National Center for Biotechnology Information (NCBI).

16S rRNA based LTP_07_2026

- Thermoflexia
  - Thermoflexales
    Thermoflexaceae

- Chloroflexota
  - - "Thermomicrobiia"
      - - Sphaerobacterales
          Sphaerobacteraceae
      - - Nitrolancea
        - - Thermomicrobiales
            Thermomicrobiaceae
    - Chloroflexia
      - - Kallotenuales
          Kallotenuaceae
        - Herpetosiphonales
          Herpetosiphonaceae
      - - Chloroflexales
          - Roseiflexaceae
          - Chloroflexaceae
  - - - Ktedonobacteria
        - Thermogemmatisporales
          Thermogemmatisporaceae
        - Ktedonobacteriales
          - Thermosporotrichaceae
          - - Ktedonosporobacteraceae
            - - Reticulibacteraceae
              - - Ktedonobacteraceae
                - Dictyobacteraceae
    - - - Tepidiformia
          - Tepidiformales
            Tepidiformaceae
        - Dehalococcoidia
          - Dehalococcoidales
            Dehalococcoidaceae
      - - - "Caldilineia"
            - Caldilineales
              Caldilineaceae
        - - Ardenticatenia
            - Aggregatilineales
              Aggregatilineaceae
            - Ardenticatenales
              Ardenticatenaceae
          - "Anaerolineia"
            - Anaerolineales
              Anaerolineaceae

120 marker proteins based GTDB release 11-RS232

- - - "Dormibacteria"
      - "Aeolococcales"
        "Aeolococcaceae"
      - "Dormibacterales"
        "Dormibacteraceae"
  - - - "Limnocylindria"
        - "Limnocylindrales"
          - "Edaphomicrobiaceae"
          - "Limnocylindraceae"
    - - - "Umbricyclopia"
          - "Umbricyclopales"
            "Uliximicrobiaceae"
        - - - - "Spiritibacteria"
                - "Spiritibacterales"
                  "Spiritibacteraceae"
            - - "Martimicrobiia"
                - "Martimicrobiales"
                  "Martimicrobiaceae"
              - Ktedonobacteria
                - Ktedonobacteriales
                  Ktedonobacteriaceae
          - - - Chloroflexia
                - - - "Chloroheliales"
                      "Chloroheliaceae"
                  - - "Thermobaculales"
                      "Thermobaculaceae"
                    - Thermomicrobiales
                      Thermomicrobiaceae
                - - Chloroflexales
                    - - Kallotenuaceae
                      - Herpetosiphonaceae
                    - - Roseiflexaceae
                      - Chloroflexaceae
            - - - "Tarhunnaeia"
                  - "Tarhunnaeales"
                    "Tarhunnaeaceae"
                - Dehalococcoidia
                  - - "Bathosphaerales"
                      "Bathosphaeraceae"
                    - Tepidiformales
                      Tepidiformaceae
                  - - Dehalococcoidales
                      Dehalococcoidaceae
                    - "Lucifugimonadales"
                      - "Lucifugimonadaceae"
                      - - "Australimonadaceae"
                        - "Monstramariaceae"
              - "Caldilineia"
                - - Ardenticatenales
                    Ardenticatenaceae
                  - "Epilineales"
                    "Epilineaceae"
                - - "Caldilineidae"
                    - SSC4
                      "Amarolineaceae"
                    - Caldilineales
                      Caldilineaceae
                  - "Anaerolineidae"
                    - - Thermoflexales
                        Thermoflexaceae
                    - - - J036
                          "Roseilineaceae"
                      - - - "Promineofilales"
                            "Promineofilaceae"
                        - - Aggregatilineales
                            - Aggregatilineaceae
                            - "Phototrophicaceae"
                          - Anaerolineales
                            - "Villigracilaceae"
                            - Anaerolineaceae

== Taxonomy ==
Genus "Candidatus Caldibacter" corrig. Spieck et al. 2020
Genus "Candidatus Chlorotrichoides" corrig. Oren et al. 2020 ["Candidatus Chlorothrix" Klappenbach & Pierson 2004 non Dyar 1921 non Berger-Perrot 1982]
Genus "Candidatus Nitrocaldera" Spieck et al. 2020
Genus "Candidatus Nitrotheca" Spieck et al. 2020
Class "Poriflexia" Mehrshad et al. 2018

- Genus ?"Candidatus Poriflexus" Kogawa et al. 2022

Class "Limnocylindria" Mehrshad et al. 2018

- Order "Limnocylindrales" Mehrshad et al. 2018
  - Family "Edaphomicrobiaceae" Ortiz et al. 2021 [CSP1-4]
  - Family "Limnocylindraceae" Mehrshad et al. 2018 (SL56)

Class "Umbricyclopia" Mehrshad et al. 2018 ["Uliximicrobia" Williams et al. 2024; UBA11872]

- Order "Umbricyclopales" Mehrshad et al. 2018 ["Uliximicrobiales" Williams et al. 2024; UBA12225]
  - Family ?"Umbricyclopaceae" Mehrshad et al. 2018 (TK10)
  - Family "Uliximicrobiaceae" Mehrshad et al. 2018 [JAJDUF01]

Class "Spiritibacteria" Williams et al. 2024

- Order "Spiritibacterales" Williams et al. 2024
  - Family "Spiritibacteraceae" Williams et al. 2024

Class "Martimicrobiia" corrig. Williams et al. 2024 [UBA4733]

- Order "Martimicrobiales" Williams et al. 2024 [UBA4733]
  - Family "Martimicrobiaceae" Williams et al. 2024

Class Ktedonobacteria Cavaletti et al. 2007 emend. Yabe et al. 2010

- Order Thermogemmatisporales Yabe et al. 2011
  - Family Thermogemmatisporaceae Yabe et al. 2011
- Order Ktedonobacterales Cavaletti et al. 2007
  - Family Dictyobacteraceae Wang et al. 2019
  - Family Ktedonobacteraceae corrig. Cavaletti et al. 2007
  - Family Ktedonosporobacteraceae Yan et al. 2020
  - Family Reticulibacteraceae Yabe et al. 2021
    - Genus ?Reticulibacter Yabe et al. 2021
  - Family Thermosporotrichaceae Yabe et al. 2010

Class Thermomicrobiia Oren, Parte & Garrity 2016

- Order Sphaerobacterales Stackebrandt, Rainey & Ward-Rainey 1997
  - Family Sphaerobacteraceae Stackebrandt, Rainey & Ward-Rainey 1997
- Order Thermomicrobiales Garrity & Holt 2002
  - Family Thermomicrobiaceae Garrity & Holt 2002

Class Chloroflexia Gupta et al. 2013

- Genus ?"Dehalobium" Wu et al. 2002
- Genus ?"Candidatus Lithoflexus" Saghai et al. 2020
- Genus ?"Candidatus Sarcinithrix" Nierychlo et al. 2019
- Order "Chloroheliales" Tsuji et al. 2024
  - Family "Chloroheliaceae" Tsuji et al. 2024
- Order "Thermobaculales" Chuvochina et al. 2023
  - Family "Thermobaculaceae" Chuvochina et al. 2023
- Order Kallotenuales Cole et al. 2013
  - Family Kallotenuaceae Cole et al. 2013
- Order Herpetosiphonales Gupta et al. 2013
  - Family Herpetosiphonaceae Gupta et al. 2013
- Order Chloroflexales Gupta et al. 2013
  - Suborder Roseiflexineae Gupta et al. 2013
    - Family Roseiflexaceae Gupta et al. 2013 ["Kouleotrichaceae" Mehrshad et al. 2018]
  - Suborder Chloroflexineae Gupta et al. 2013
    - Family Chloroflexaceae Gupta et al. 2013
    - Family Oscillochloridaceae Gupta et al. 2013

Class "Tarhunnaeia" Williams et al. 2024 [UBA6077]

- Order "Tarhunnaeales" Williams et al. 2024 [UBA6077]
  - Family "Tarhunnaeaceae" Williams et al. 2024 [CF-72]

Class "Bathosphaeria" Mehrshad et al. 2018 [UBA2979]

- Order "Bathosphaerales" Mehrshad et al. 2018 [UBA2979]
  - Family "Bathosphaeraceae" Mehrshad et al. 2018 [UBA2979]

Class Tepidiformia Kochetkova et al. 2020

- Order Tepidiformales Kochetkova et al. 2020
  - Family Tepidiformaceae Kochetkova et al. 2020

Class Dehalococcoidia Löffler et al. 2013

- Order Dehalococcoidales Löffler et al. 2013
  - Family Dehalococcoidaceae Löffler et al. 2013
- Order "Lucifugimonadales" Lim et al. 2023 ["Australimonadales" Prabhu et al. 2024; "Monstramariales" Landry et al. 2017] (SAR202)
  - Family "Australimonadaceae" Prabhu et al. 2024
  - Family "Lucifugimonadaceae" Lim et al. 2023 [UBA1151]
  - Family "Monstramariaceae" Landry et al. 2017 [SAR202 group III; UBA3495]

Class Ardenticatenia Kawaichi et al. 2013

- Order Ardenticatenales Kawaichi et al. 2013
  - Family Ardenticatenaceae Kawaichi et al. 2013
- Order "Epilineales" Petriglieri et al. 2023
  - Family "Epilineaceae" Petriglieri et al. 2023

Class "Caldilineia" Oren, Parte & Garrity 2016 ex Cavalier-Smith 2020

- Order Caldilineales Yamada et al. 2006
  - Family "Amarolineaceae" Andersen et al. 2019
  - Family Caldilineaceae Yamada et al. 2006

Class Thermoflexia Dodsworth et al. 2014

- Order Thermoflexales Dodsworth et al. 2014
  - Family "Roseilineaceae" Ward et al. 2021
  - Family Thermoflexaceae Dodsworth et al. 2014

Class "Thermofontia" corrig. Ward et al. 2018

- Order "Phototrophicales" Zheng et al. 2022
  - Family "Phototrophicaceae" Zheng et al. 2022

Class "Anaerolineia" Oren, Parte & Garrity 2016

- Genus ?"Candidatus Defluviifilum" Nierychlo et al. 2019
- Family "Profundisolitariaceae" Mehrshad et al. 2018 (CL500-11)
- Order "Promineifilales" Chuvochina et al. 2023
  - Family "Promineifilaceae" Chuvochina et al. 2023
- Order Aggregatilineales Nakahara et al. 2019
  - Family Aggregatilineaceae Nakahara et al. 2019
- Order Anaerolineales Yamada et al. 2006
  - Family "Villigracilaceae" Petriglieri et al. 2023
  - Family Anaerolineaceae Yamada et al. 2006

== Etymology ==
The name Chloroflexi is a Neolatin nominative case masculine plural of Chloroflexus, which is the name of the first genus described. The noun is a combination of the Greek adjective chloros, -a, on (χλωρός, -ά, -όν), meaning "greenish-yellow," and the Latin masculine passive perfect participle flexus (of flecto), meaning "bent." The etymology is unrelated to chlorine, an element that was discovered in 1810 by Sir Humphry Davy and named after its pale green colour. Another phylum with the same root is Chlorobiota, whereas "Cyanobacteria" has the root cyanos (κύανος), meaning "blue-green."

Unlike some other phyla, there is no theme root in the name of genera of Chloroflexota, and in fact many genera beginning with "Chloro-" or ending in "-chloris" are either cyanobacteria or chlorobi.

== See also ==
- List of Bacteria genera
- List of bacterial orders
