= Euxinia =

Condition when water is both anoxic and sulfidic

Euxinia or euxinic conditions occur when water is both anoxic and sulfidic. This means that there is no oxygen (O_{2}) and a raised level of free hydrogen sulfide (H_{2}S). Euxinic bodies of water are frequently strongly stratified; have an oxic, highly productive, thin surface layer; and have anoxic, sulfidic bottom water. The Black Sea is such a body of water, and the word "euxinia" is derived from its Greek name Εὔξεινος Πόντος (Euxeinos Pontos, which translates to "hospitable sea"). Euxinic deep water is a key component of the Canfield ocean, a model of oceans during part of the Proterozoic eon (a part specifically known as the Boring Billion) proposed by Donald Canfield, an American geologist, in 1998. There is still debate within the scientific community on both the duration and frequency of euxinic conditions in the ancient oceans. Euxinia is relatively rare in modern bodies of water, but does still happen in places such as the Black Sea and certain fjords.

== Background ==
Euxinia most frequently occurred in the Earth's ancient oceans, but its distribution and frequency of occurrence are still under debate. The original model was that it was quite constant for approximately a billion years. Some meta-analyses have questioned how persistent euxinic conditions were based on relatively small black shale deposits in a period when the ocean should have theoretically been preserving more organic matter.

Before the Great Oxygenation Event happened approximately 2.3 billion years ago, there was little free oxygen in either the atmosphere or the ocean. It was originally thought that the ocean accumulated oxygen soon after the atmosphere did, but this idea was challenged by Canfield in 1998 when he proposed that instead of the deep ocean becoming oxidizing, it became sulfidic. This hypothesis is partially based on the disappearance of banded iron formations from the geological records 1.8 billion years ago. Canfield argued that although enough oxygen entered the atmosphere to erode sulfides in continental rocks, there was not enough oxygen to mix into the deep ocean. This would result in an anoxic deep ocean with an increased flux of sulfur from the continents. The sulfur would strip iron ions from the sea water, resulting in iron sulfide (pyrite), a portion of which was eventually buried. When sulfide became the major oceanic reductant instead of iron, the deep water became euxinic. This has become what is known as the Canfield ocean, a model backed by the increase in presence of δ^{34}S in sedimentary pyrite and the discovery of evidence of the first sulfate evaporites.

Anoxia and sulfidic conditions often occur together. In anoxic conditions anaerobic, sulfate reducing bacteria convert sulfate into sulfide, creating sulfidic conditions. The emergence of this metabolic pathway was very important in the pre-oxygenated oceans because adaptations to otherwise inhabitable or "toxic" environments like this may have played a role in the diversification of early eukaryotes and protozoa in the pre-Phanerozoic.

Euxinia still occurs occasionally today, mostly in meromictic lakes and silled basins such as the Black Sea and some fjords. It is rare in modern times; less than 0.5% of today's sea floor is euxinic.

== Causes ==
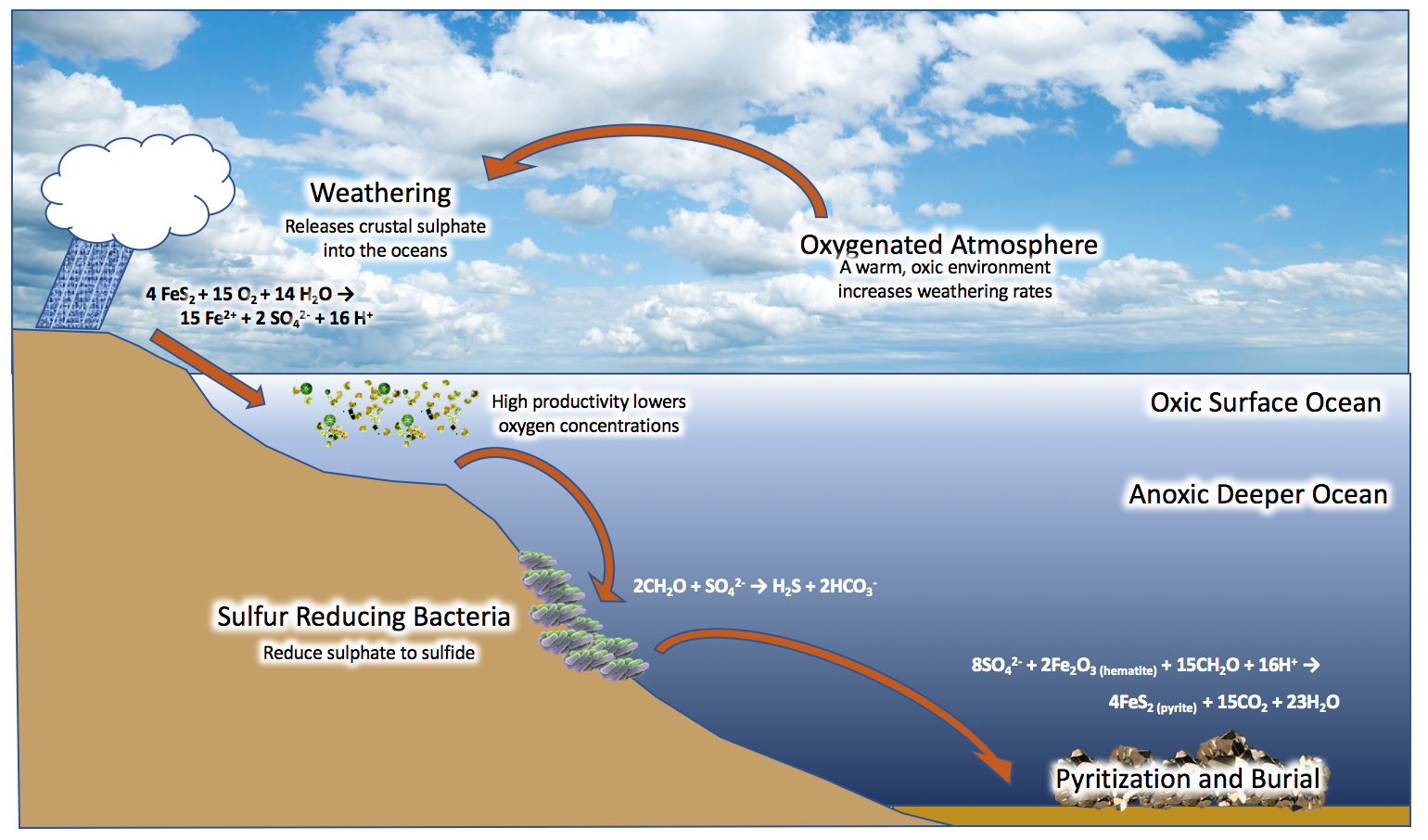
Diagram of mechanisms of euxinia in the Canfield Ocean

The basic requirements for the formation of euxinic conditions are the absence of oxygen (O_{2}), and the presence of sulfate ions (SO_{4}^{2−}), organic matter (CH_{2}O), and bacteria capable of reducing sulfate to hydrogen sulfide (H_{2}S). The bacteria utilize the redox potential of sulfate as an oxidant and organic matter as a reductant to generate chemical energy through cellular respiration. The chemical species of interest can be represented via the reaction:

2CH_{2}O + SO_{4}^{2−} → H_{2}S + 2HCO_{3}^{−}

In the reaction above, the sulfur has been reduced to form the byproduct hydrogen sulfide, the characteristic compound present in water under euxinic conditions. Although sulfate reduction occurs in waters throughout the world, most modern-day aquatic habitats are oxygenated due to photosynthetic production of oxygen and gas exchange between the atmosphere and surface water. Sulfate reduction in these environments is often limited to occurring in seabed sediments that have a strong redox gradient and become anoxic at some depth below the sediment-water interface. In the ocean the rate of these reactions is not limited by sulfate, which has been present in large quantities throughout the oceans for the past 2.1 billion years. The Great Oxygenation Event increased atmospheric oxygen concentrations such that oxidative weathering of sulfides became a major source of sulfate to the ocean. Despite plentiful sulfate ions being present in solution, they are not preferentially used by most bacteria. The reduction of sulfate does not give as much energy to an organism as reduction of oxygen or nitrate, so the concentrations of these other elements must be nearly zero for sulfate-reducing bacteria to out-compete aerobic and denitrifying bacteria. In most modern settings these conditions only occur in a small portion of sediments, resulting in insufficient concentrations of hydrogen sulfide to form euxinic waters.

Conditions required for the formation of persistent euxinia include anoxic waters, high nutrient levels, and a stratified water column. These conditions are not all-inclusive and are based largely on modern observations of euxinia. Conditions leading up to and triggering large-scale euxinic events, such as the Canfield ocean, are likely the result of multiple interlinking factors, many of which have been inferred through studies of the geologic record at relevant locations. The formation of stratified anoxic waters with high nutrient levels is influenced by a variety of global and local-scale phenomena such as the presence of nutrient traps and a warming climate.

=== Nutrient traps ===
In order for euxinic conditions to persist, a positive feedback loop must perpetuate organic matter export to bottom waters and reduction of sulfate under anoxic conditions. Organic matter export is driven by high levels of primary production in the photic zone, supported by a continual supply of nutrients to the oxic surface waters. A natural source of nutrients, such as phosphate (PO^{3−}_{4}), comes from weathering of rocks and subsequent transport of these dissolved nutrients via rivers. In a nutrient trap, increased input of phosphate from rivers, high rates of recycling of phosphate from sediments, and slow vertical mixing in the water column allow for euxinic conditions to persist.

==== Geography ====
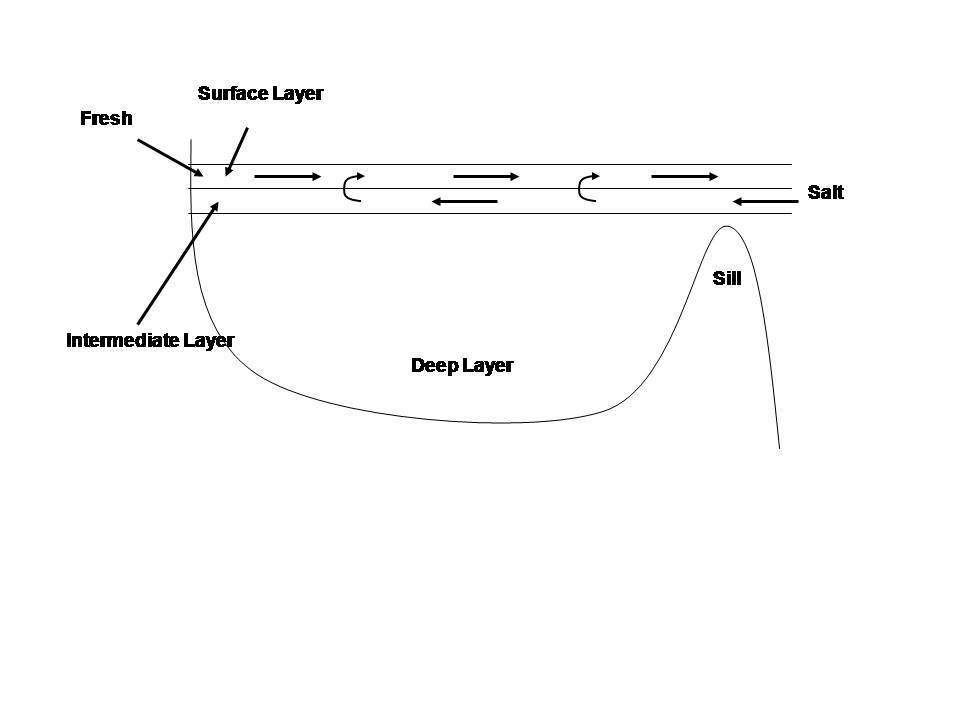
A simplified model of estuarine circulation in a silled basin. Depicted here is a three-layered body of water which has been further simplified in the article by combining the intermediate and deep layers.

The arrangement of the continents has changed over time due to plate tectonics, resulting in the bathymetry of ocean basins also changing over time. The shape and size of the basins influences the circulation patterns and concentration of nutrients within them. Numerical models simulating past arrangements of continents have shown that nutrient traps can form in certain scenarios, increasing local concentrations of phosphate and setting up potential euxinic conditions. On a smaller scale, silled basins often act as nutrient traps due to their estuarine circulation. Estuarine circulation occurs where surface water is replenished from river input and precipitation, causing an outflow of surface waters from the basin, while deep water flows into the basin over the sill. This type of circulation allows for anoxic, high nutrient bottom water to develop within the basin.

==== Stratification ====
Stratified waters, in combination with slow vertical mixing, are essential to maintaining euxinic conditions. Stratification occurs when two or more water masses with different densities occupy the same basin. While the less dense surface water can exchange gas with the oxygen-rich atmosphere, the denser bottom waters maintain low oxygen content. In the modern oceans, thermohaline circulation and upwelling prevent the oceans from maintaining anoxic bottom waters. In a silled basin, the stable stratified layers only allow surface water to flow out of the basin while the deep water remains anoxic and relatively unmixed. During an intrusion of dense saltwater however, the nutrient-rich bottom water upwells, causing increased productivity in the surface, further enhancing the nutrient trap due to biological pumping. Rising sea level can exacerbate this process by increasing the amount of deep water entering a silled basin and enhancing estuarine circulation.

=== Warming climate ===
A warming climate increases surface temperatures of waters which affects multiple aspects of euxinic water formation. As waters warm, the solubility of oxygen decreases, allowing for deep anoxic waters to form more readily. Additionally, the warmer water causes increased respiration of organic matter leading to further oxygen depletion. Higher temperatures enhance the hydrologic cycle, increasing evaporation from bodies of water, resulting in increased precipitation. This causes higher rates of weathering of rocks and therefore higher nutrient concentrations in river outflows. The nutrients allow for more productivity resulting in more marine snow and subsequently lower oxygen in deep waters due to increased respiration.

Volcanism has also been proposed as a factor in creating euxinic conditions. The carbon dioxide (CO_{2}) released during volcanic outgassing causes global warming which has cascading effects on the formation of euxinic conditions.

== Evidence for euxinic events ==
=== Black shale ===
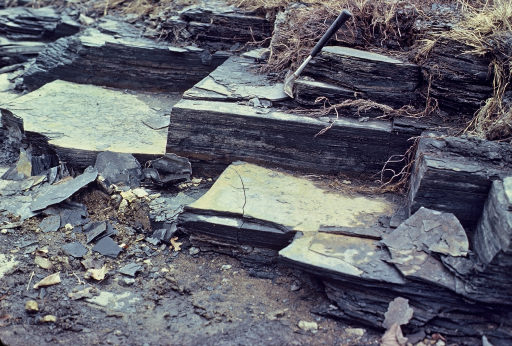
Black shale is one of the preliminary indicators of anoxia and perhaps euxinia

Black shales are organic rich, microlaminated sedimentary rocks often associated with bottom water anoxia. This is because anoxia slows the degradation of organic matter, allowing for greater burial in the sediments. Other evidence for anoxic burial of black shale includes the lack of bioturbation, meaning that there were no organisms burrowing into the sediment because there was no oxygen for respiration. There must also be a source of organic matter for burial, generally from production near the oxic surface. Many papers discussing ancient euxinic events use the presence of black shale as a preliminary proxy for anoxic bottom waters, but their presence does not in and of itself indicate euxinia or even strong anoxia. Generally geochemical testing is needed to provide better evidence for conditions.

=== Geochemistry ===
Some researchers study the occurrence of euxinia in ancient oceans because it was more prevalent then than it is today. Since ancient oceans cannot be directly observed, scientists use geology and chemistry to find evidence in sedimentary rock created under euxinic conditions. Some of these techniques come from studying modern examples of euxinia, while others are derived from geochemistry. Though modern euxinic environments have geochemical properties in common with ancient euxinic oceans, the physical processes causing euxinia most likely vary between the two.

==== Isotopes ====
Stable isotope ratios can be used to infer the environmental conditions during the formation of sedimentary rock. Using stoichiometry and knowledge of redox pathways, paleogeologists can use isotopes ratios of elements to determine the chemical composition of the water and sediments when burial occurred.

Sulfur isotopes are frequently used to look for evidence of ancient euxinia. Low δ^{34}S in black shales and sedimentary rocks provides positive evidence for euxinic formation conditions. The pyrite (FeS_{2}) in euxinic basins typically has higher concentrations of light sulfur isotopes than pyrite in the modern ocean. The reduction of sulfate to sulfide favors the lighter sulfur isotopes (^{32}S) and becomes depleted in the heavier isotopes (^{34}S). This lighter sulfide then bonds with Fe^{2+} to form FeS_{2} which is then partially preserved in the sediments. In most modern systems, sulfate eventually becomes limiting, and the isotopic weights of sulfur in both sulfate and sulfide (preserved as FeS_{2}) become equal.

Molybdenum (Mo), the most common transition metal ion in modern seawater, is also used to look for evidence for euxinia. Weathering of rocks provides an input of MoO_{4}^{2–} into oceans. Under oxic conditions, MoO_{4}^{2–} is very unreactive, but in modern euxinic environments such as the Black Sea, molybdenum precipitates out as oxythiomolybdate (MoO_{4−x}S_{x}^{2–} ). The isotope ratio for Molybdenum (δ^{97/95} Mo) in euxinic sediments appears to be higher than in oxic conditions. Additionally, the concentration of molybdenum is frequently correlated with the concentration of organic matter in euxinic sediments. The use of Mo to indicate euxinia is still under debate.

==== Trace-element enrichment ====
Under euxinic conditions, some trace elements such as Mo, U, V, Cd, Cu, Tl, Ni, Sb, and Zn, become insoluble. This means that euxinic sediments would contain more of the solid form of these elements than the background seawater. For example, Molybdenum and other trace metals become insoluble in anoxic and sulfidic conditions, so over time the seawater becomes depleted of trace metals under conditions of persistent euxinia, and preserved sediments are relatively enriched with molybdenum and other trace elements.

==== Organic biomarkers ====
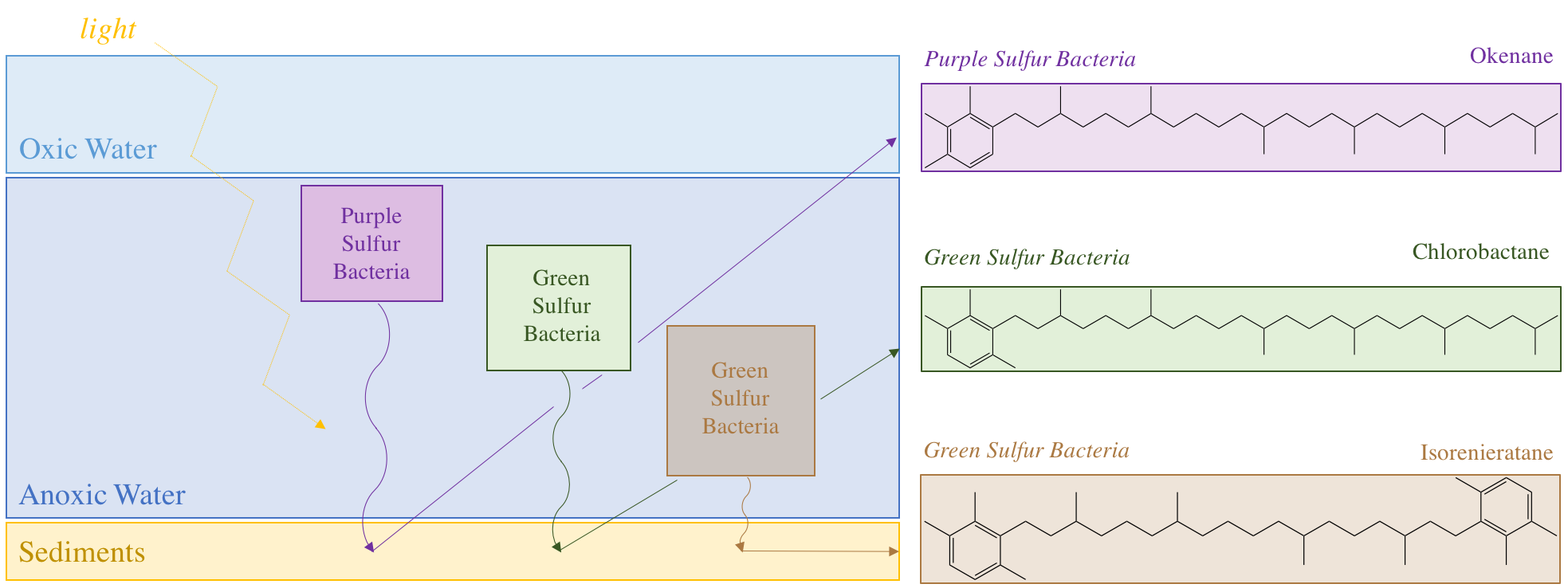
Pigments from purple and green sulfur reducing bacteria are strong evidence for euxinic conditions

Bacteria such as green sulfur bacteria and purple sulfur bacteria, which exist where the photic zone overlaps with euxinic water masses, leave pigments behind in sediments. These pigments can be used to identify past euxinic conditions. The pigments used to identify past presence of green sulfur bacteria are chlorobactane and isorenieratene. The pigments used to identify past presence of purple sulfur bacteria is okenane.

==== Iron geochemistry ====
Pyrite (FeS_{2}) is a mineral formed by the reaction of hydrogen sulfide (H_{2}S) and bioreactive iron (Fe^{2+}). In oxic bottom waters pyrite can only form in sediments where H_{2}S is present. However, in iron-rich euxinic environments, pyrite formation can occur at higher rates in both the water column and in sediments due to higher concentrations of H_{2}S. Therefore the presence of euxinic conditions can be inferred by the ratio of pyrite-bound iron to the total iron in sediments. High ratios of pyrite-bound iron can be used as an indicator of past euxinic conditions. Similarly, if >45% of the bioreactive iron in sediments is pyrite-bound, then anoxic or euxinic conditions can be inferred. While useful, these methods do not provide definitive proof of euxinia because not all euxinic waters have the same concentrations of bioreactive iron available. These relationships have been found to be present in the modern euxinic Black Sea.

== Euxinic events in Earth's history ==
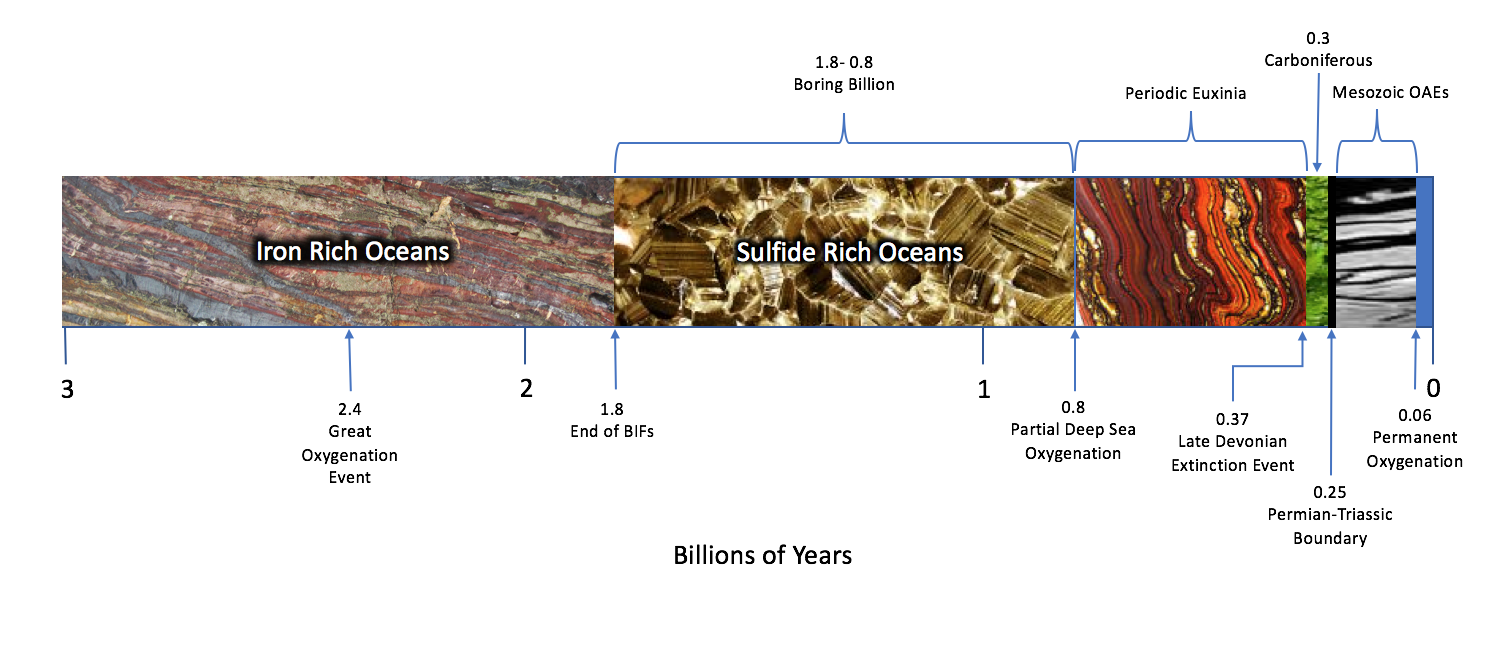
Presence of euxinia in the world's ancient deep oceans. According to Canfield, the deep ocean became sulfitic around 1.8 billion years ago and stayed that way for much of the boring billion. Periodic euxinia dominated through the Late Devonian Kelwasser events, and then most likely disappeared during the Carboniferous. Euxinia reemerged at the Permian-Triassic Boundary, and may have been present during the Ocean Anoxia Events of the Mesozoic. Euxinia is rare in Cenozoic oceans. Adapted from Lyons, 2008

=== Proterozoic ===
The Proterozoic is the transition era between anoxic and oxygenated oceans. The classic model is that the end of the Banded iron formations (BIFs) was due to the injection of oxygen into the deep ocean, an approximately 0.6 billion year lag behind the Great Oxygenation Event. Canfield, however, argued that anoxia lasted much longer, and the end of the banded iron formations was due to the introduction of sulfide. Supporting Canfield's original hypothesis, 1.84 billion year old sedimentary records have been found in the Animike group in Canada that exhibit close to full pyritization on top of the last of the banded iron formations, showing evidence of a transition to euxinic conditions in that basin. In order for full pyritization to happen, nearly all of the sulfate in the water was reduced to sulfide, which stripped the iron from the water, forming pyrite. Because this basin was open to the ocean, deep euxinia was interpreted as being a widespread phenomena. This euxinia is hypothesized to have lasted until about 0.8 billion years ago, making basin bottom euxinia a potentially widespread feature throughout the Boring Billion.

Further evidence for euxinia was discovered in the McArthur Basin in Australia, where similar iron chemistry was found. The degree of pyritization and the δ^{34}S were both high, supporting the presence of anoxia and sulfide, as well as the depletion of sulfate. A different study found biomarkers for green sulfur bacteria and purple sulfur bacteria in the same area, providing further evidence for the reduction of sulfate to hydrogen sulfide.

Molybdenum isotopes have been used to examine the distribution of euxinia in the Proterozoic eon, and suggest that perhaps euxinia was not as widespread as Canfield initially postulated. Bottom waters may have been more widely suboxic than anoxic, and there could have been negative feedback between euxinia and the high levels of surface primary production needed to sustain euxinic conditions. Further work has suggested that from 700 million years ago (late Proterozoic) and onward, the deep oceans may have actually been anoxic and iron rich with conditions similar to those during the formation of BIFs.

=== Phanerozoic ===
There is evidence for multiple euxinic events during the Phanerozoic. It is most likely that euxinia was periodic during the Paleozoic and Mesozoic, but geologic data is too sparse to draw any large scale conclusions. In this eon, there is some evidence that euxinic events are potentially linked with mass extinction events including the Late Devonian and Permian–Triassic.

==== Paleozoic ====
The periodic presence of euxinic conditions in the Lower Cambrian has been supported by evidence found on the Yangtze platform in South China. Sulfur isotopes during the transition from Proterozoic to Phanerozoic give evidence for widespread euxinia, perhaps lasting throughout the Cambrian period. Towards the end of the Lower Cambrian, the euxinic chemocline grew deeper until euxinia was present only in the sediments, and once sulfate became limiting, conditions became anoxic instead of euxinic. Some areas eventually became oxic, while others eventually returned to euxinic for some time.

Geological records from the paleozoic in the Selwyn Basin in Northern Canada have also shown evidence for episodic stratification and mixing, where, using δ^{34}S, it was determined that hydrogen sulfide was more prevalent than sulfate. Although this was not originally attributed to euxinia, further studies found that seawater in that time likely had low concentrations of sulfate, meaning that the sulfur in the water was primarily in the form of sulfide. This combined with organic-rich black shale provide strong evidence for euxinia.

There is similar evidence in the black shales in the mid-continent North America from the Devonian and early Mississippian periods. Isorenieratene, a pigment known as a proxy for an anoxic photic zone, has been found in the geological record in Illinois and Michigan. Although present, these events were probably ephemeral and did not last for longer periods of time. Similar periodic evidence of euxinia can also be found in the Sunbury shales of Kentucky.

Evidence for euxinia has also been tied to the Kellwasser events of the Late Devonian Extinction event. Euxinia in basinal waters in what is now central Europe (Germany, Poland, and France) persisted for part of the late Devonian, and may have spread up into shallow waters, contributing to the extinction event.

There was perhaps a period of oxygenation of bottom waters during the Carboniferous, most likely between the Late Devonian Extinction and the Permian-Triassic Extinction, at which point euxinia would be very rare in the paleo oceans.

The Permian–Triassic extinction event may also have some ties to euxinia, with hypercapnia and hydrogen sulfide toxicity killing off many species. Presence of a biomarker for anaerobic photosynthesis by green sulfur bacteria has been found spanning from the Permian to early Triassic in sedimentary rock in both Australia and China, meaning that euxinic conditions extended up quite shallow in the water column, contributing to the extinctions and perhaps even slowed the recovery. It is uncertain, however, just how widespread photic zone euxinia was during this period. Modelers have hypothesized that due to environmental conditions anoxia and sulfide may have been brought up from a deep, vast euxinic reservoir in upwelling areas, but stable, gyre-like areas remained oxic.

==== Mesozoic ====
The Mesozoic is well known for its distinct Ocean Anoxic Events (OAEs) which resulted in the burial of layers of black shale. Although these OAEs are not stand alone evidence for euxinia, many do contain biomarkers which support euxinic formation. Again, evidence is not universal. OAEs may have spurred the spread of existing euxinia, especially in upwelling regions or semi-restricted basins, but photic zone euxinia did not happen everywhere.

==== Cenozoic ====
Few episodes of euxinia are evident in the sedimentary record during the Cenozoic. Since the end of the Cretaceous OAEs, it is most likely that the oceanic bottom waters have stayed oxic.

== Modern euxinia ==
Euxinic conditions have nearly vanished from Earth's open-ocean environments, but a few small scale examples still exist today. Many of these locations share common biogeochemical characteristics. For example, low rates of overturning and vertical mixing of the total water column is common in euxinic bodies of water. Small surface area to depth ratios allow multiple stable layers to form while limiting wind-driven overturning and thermohaline circulation. Furthermore, restricted mixing enhances stratified layers of high nutrient density which are reinforced by biological recycling. Within the chemocline, highly specialized organisms such as green sulfur bacteria take advantage of the strong redox potential gradient and minimal sunlight.

=== The Black Sea ===
Map of the Black Sea showing the many rivers that supply the basin with low-density fresh water, along with the narrow Bosphorus Strait to the southwest that supplies the basin with high-density salt water. This assists in the stratification and euxinia that exists in the modern Black Sea.

The Black Sea is a commonly used modern model for understanding biogeochemical processes that occur under euxinic conditions. It is thought to represent the conditions of Earth's proto-oceans and thus assists in the interpretation of oceanic proxies. Black Sea sediment contains redox reactions to depths of tens of meters, compared to single centimeters in the open ocean. This unique feature is important for understanding the behavior of the redox cascade under euxinic conditions.

The only connection between the open ocean and the Black Sea is the Bosphorus Strait, through which dense Mediterranean waters are imported. Subsequently, numerous rivers, such as the Danube, Don, Dnieper, and Dniester, drain fresh water into the Black Sea, which floats on top of the more dense Mediterranean water, causing a strong, stratified water column. This stratification is maintained by a strong pycnocline which restricts ventilation of deep waters and results in an intermediate layer called the chemocline, a sharp boundary separating oxic surface waters from anoxic bottom waters usually between 50m and 100m depth, with interannual variation attributed to large scale changes in temperature. Well-mixed, oxic conditions exist above the chemocline and sulfidic conditions are dominant below. Surface oxygen and deep water sulfide do not overlap via vertical mixing, but horizontal entrainment of oxygenated waters and vertical mixing of oxidized manganese into sulfidic waters may occur near the Bosphorus Strait inlet. Manganese and iron oxides likely oxidize hydrogen sulfide near the chemocline, resulting in the decrease in H_{2}S concentrations as one approaches the chemocline from below.

=== Meromictic lakes ===
Meromictic lakes are poorly mixed and anoxic bodies of water with strong vertical stratification. While meromictic lakes are frequently categorized as bodies of water with the potential for euxinic conditions, many do not exhibit euxinia. Meromictic lakes are infamous for limnic eruptions. These events usually coincide with nearby tectonic or volcanic activity that disturbs the otherwise stable stratification of meromictic lakes. This can result in the release of immense concentrations of stored toxic gasses from the anoxic bottom waters, such as CO_{2} and H_{2}S, especially from euxinic meromictic lakes. In high enough concentration, these limnic explosions can be deadly to humans and animals, such as the Lake Nyos disaster in 1986.

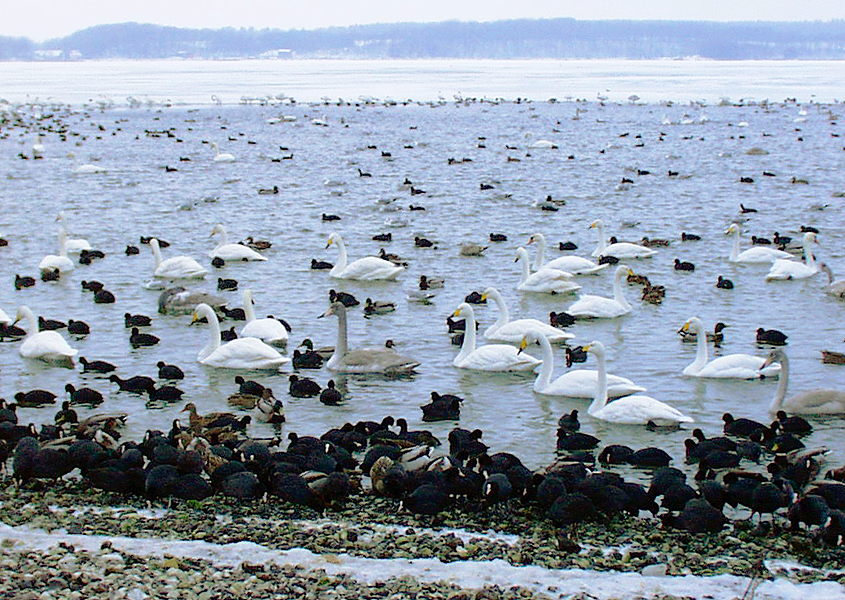
Mariager fjord often produces a "rotten egg" smell in the summer due to sulfur content.

=== North Sea fjords ===
Some fjords develop euxinia if the connection to the open ocean is constricted, similar to the case of the Black Sea. This constriction prohibits relatively dense, oxygen-rich oceanic water from mixing with the bottom water of the fjord, which leads to stable stratified layers in the fjord. Low salinity melt water forms a lens of fresh, low density water on top of a more dense mass of bottom water. Ground sources of sulfur are also an important cause for euxinia in fjords.

==== Framvaren Fjord ====
This fjord was born as a glacial lake that was separated from the open ocean (the North Sea) when it was lifted during glacial rebound. A shallow channel (2m deep) was dug in 1850, providing a marginal connection to the North Sea. A strong pycnocline separates fresh surface water from dense, saline bottom water, and this pycnocline reduces mixing between the layers. Anoxic conditions persist below the chemocline at 20m, and the fjord has the highest levels of hydrogen sulfide in the anoxic marine world. Like the Black Sea, vertical overlap of oxygen and sulfur is limited, but the decline of H_{2}S approaching the chemocline from below is indicative of oxidation of H_{2}S, which has been attributed to manganese and iron oxides, photo-autotrophic bacteria, and entrainment of oxygen horizontally from the boundaries of the fjord. These oxidation processes are similar to those present in the Black Sea.

Two strong seawater intrusion events have occurred through the channel in recent history (1902 and 1942). Seawater intrusions to fjords force dense, salty, oxygen-rich water into the typically anoxic, sulfidic bottom waters of euxinic fjords. These events result in a temporary disturbance to the chemocline, raising the depth at which H_{2}S is detected. The breakdown of the chemocline causes H_{2}S to react with dissolved oxygen in a redox reaction. This decreases the concentration of dissolved oxygen in the biologically active photic zone which can result in basin-scale fish die-offs. The 1942 event, in particular, was strong enough to chemically reduce the vast majority of oxygen and elevate the chemocline to the air-water interface. This caused a temporary state of total anoxia in the fjord, and resulted in dramatic fish mortality.

==== Mariager Fjord ====
This fjord is marked by a highly mobile chemocline with a depth that is thought to be related to temperature effects. Local reports of strong rotten egg smell- the smell of sulfur- during numerous summers around the fjord provide evidence that, like the Framvaren fjord, the chemocline has breached the surface of the fjord at least five times in the last century. Sediments export during these events increased the concentrations of dissolved phosphates, inorganic bioavailable nitrogen, and other nutrients, resulting in a harmful algal bloom.

=== Cariaco Basin ===
The Cariaco Basin in Venezuela has been used to study the cycle of organic material in euxinic marine environments. An increase in productivity coincident with post glacial nutrient loading probably caused a transition from oxic to anoxic and subsequently euxinic conditions around 14.5 thousand years ago. High productivity at the surface produces a rain of particulate organic matter to the sub surface where anoxic, sulfidic conditions persist. The organic matter in this region is oxidized with sulfate, producing reduced sulfur (H_{2}S) as a waste product. Free sulfur exists deep in the water column and up to 6m in depth in the sediment.

== See also ==
- Anoxic event
- Canfield ocean
- Redox
- Boring Billion
