= Boring Billion =

Earth history, 1.8 to 0.8 billion years ago

Life timeline
← / Earth formed; ← / Earliest water; ← / LUCA; ← / Earliest fossils; ← / Great Oxygenation Event; ← / Sexual reproduction; ← / Earliest fungi; ← / Neoproterozoic oxygenation event; ← / Ediacaran biota; ← / Cambrian explosion; ← / Earliest tetrapods; ← / Earliest hominoid
(million years ago)

The Boring Billion, otherwise known as the Mid-Proterozoic and Earth's Middle Ages, is an informal geological time period between 1.8 and 0.8 billion years ago (Ga) during the middle Proterozoic eon spanning from the Statherian to the Tonian periods, characterized by more or less tectonic stability, climatic stasis and slow biological evolution. Although it is bordered by two different oxygenation events (the Great Oxygenation Event and Neoproterozoic Oxygenation Event) and two global glacial events (the Huronian and Cryogenian glaciations), the Boring Billion period itself actually had very low oxygen levels and no geological evidence of glaciations.

The oceans during the Boring Billion may have been oxygen-poor, sulfidic and nutrient-deficient (i.e. euxinic), populated mainly by purple bacteria, a type of bacteriochlorophyll-based photosynthetic bacteria which uses hydrogen sulfide (H_{2}S) for carbon fixation instead of water and produces sulfur as a byproduct instead of oxygen. This is known as a Canfield ocean, and such composition may have caused the oceans to be colored black-and-milky-turquoise instead of blue or green as later. (By contrast, during the much earlier "Purple Earth" phase of the Archean eon, primitive anoxygenic photosynthesis was performed mostly by archaeal colonies using retinal-based proton pumps that absorb green light to directly synthesize adenosine triphosphate, and the oceans would have been magenta-purple.)

Despite such adverse conditions, eukaryotes may have evolved via symbiogenesis around the beginning of the Boring Billion, developed several novel adaptations such as various organelles, multicellularity and possibly sexual reproduction, and diversified into algae, fungi, protists and the early ancestors of animals at the end of this time interval. Such advances may have been important precursors to the large-scale evolutionary radiation of macroscopic complex life later in the Ediacaran Avalon Explosion and the subsequent Phanerozoic Cambrian Explosion. Nonetheless, prokaryotic cyanobacteria were the dominant autotrophic lifeforms during this time period, and likely supported an energy-poor food-web with a small number of protists at the apex level. The land was likely inhabited at the coastal and riparian margins by washed-ashore cyanobacteria and eukaryotic proto-lichens, the latter being more successful on dry land probably due to greater robustness against arid environment and lethal solar irradiation (as then the protective ozone layer had not yet formed).

== Description ==
In 1995, geologists Roger Buick, Davis Des Marais, and Andrew Knoll reviewed the apparent lack of major biological, geological, and climatic events during the Mesoproterozoic era 1.6 to 1 billion years ago (Ga), and, thus, described it as "the dullest time in Earth's history". The term "Boring Billion" was coined by paleontologist Martin Brasier to refer to the time between about 2 and 1 Ga, which was characterized by geochemical stasis and glacial stagnation. In 2013, geochemist Grant Young used the term "Barren Billion" to refer to a period of apparent glacial stagnation and lack of carbon isotope excursions from 1.8 to 0.8 Ga. In 2014, geologists Peter Cawood and Chris Hawkesworth called the time between 1.7 and 0.75 Ga "Earth's Middle Ages" due to a lack of evidence of tectonic movement.

The Boring Billion is now largely cited as spanning about 1.8 to 0.8 Ga, contained within the Proterozoic eon, mainly the Mesoproterozoic. However, others have argued that it should instead span from about 2.0 to 1.0 Ga and be tied to variability in the carbon isotope record. The Boring Billion is characterized by geological, climatic, and by-and-large evolutionary stasis, with low nutrient abundance.

In the time leading up to the Boring Billion, Earth experienced the Great Oxygenation Event due to the evolution of oxygenic photosynthetic cyanobacteria, and the resultant Huronian glaciation (Snowball Earth), formation of the UV-blocking ozone layer, and oxidation of several metals. Oxygen levels during the Boring Billion are thought to have been markedly lower than during the Great Oxidation Event, perhaps 0.1% to 10% of modern levels. It was ended by the breakup of the supercontinent Rodinia during the Tonian (1000–720 Ma) period, a second oxygenation event, and another Snowball Earth in the Cryogenian period.

== Tectonic stasis ==
Reconstruction of Columbia (1.6 Gya)

The evolution of Earth's biosphere, atmosphere, and hydrosphere has long been linked to the supercontinent cycle, where the continents aggregate and then drift apart. The Boring Billion saw the evolution of two supercontinents: Columbia (or Nuna) and Rodinia.

The supercontinent Columbia formed between 2.0 and 1.7 Ga and remained intact until at least 1.3 Ga. Geological and paleomagnetic evidence suggest that Columbia underwent only minor changes to form the supercontinent Rodinia from 1.1 to 0.9 Ga. Paleogeographic reconstructions suggest that the supercontinent assemblage was located in equatorial and temperate climate zones, and there is little or no evidence for continental fragments in polar regions.

Due to the lack of evidence of sediment build-up (on passive margins) which would occur as a result of rifting, the supercontinent probably did not break up, and rather was simply an assemblage of juxtaposed proto-continents and cratons. There is no evidence of rifting until the formation of Rodinia, 1.25 Ga in North Laurentia, and 1 Ga in East Baltica and South Siberia. Breakup did not occur until 0.75 Ga, marking the end of the Boring Billion. This tectonic stasis may have been related in ocean and atmospheric chemistry.

It is possible the asthenosphere—the semi-solid layer of Earth's mantle that tectonic plates essentially float and move around upon—was too hot to sustain modern plate tectonics at this time. Instead of vigorous plate recycling at subduction zones, plates were linked together for billions of years until the mantle cooled off sufficiently. The onset of this component of plate tectonics may have been aided by the cooling and thickening of the crust that, once initiated, made plate subduction anomalously strong, occurring at the end of the Boring Billion.

Nonetheless, major magmatic events still occurred, such as the formation (via magma plume) of the 220,000 km^{2} (85,000 mi^{2}) central Australian Musgrave Province from 1.22 to 1.12 Ga, and the 2,700,000 km^{2} (1,000,000 mi^{2}) Canadian Mackenzie Large Igneous Province 1.27 Ga. Plate tectonics were still active enough to build mountains, with several orogenies, including the Grenville orogeny, occurring at the time.

== Climatic stability ==
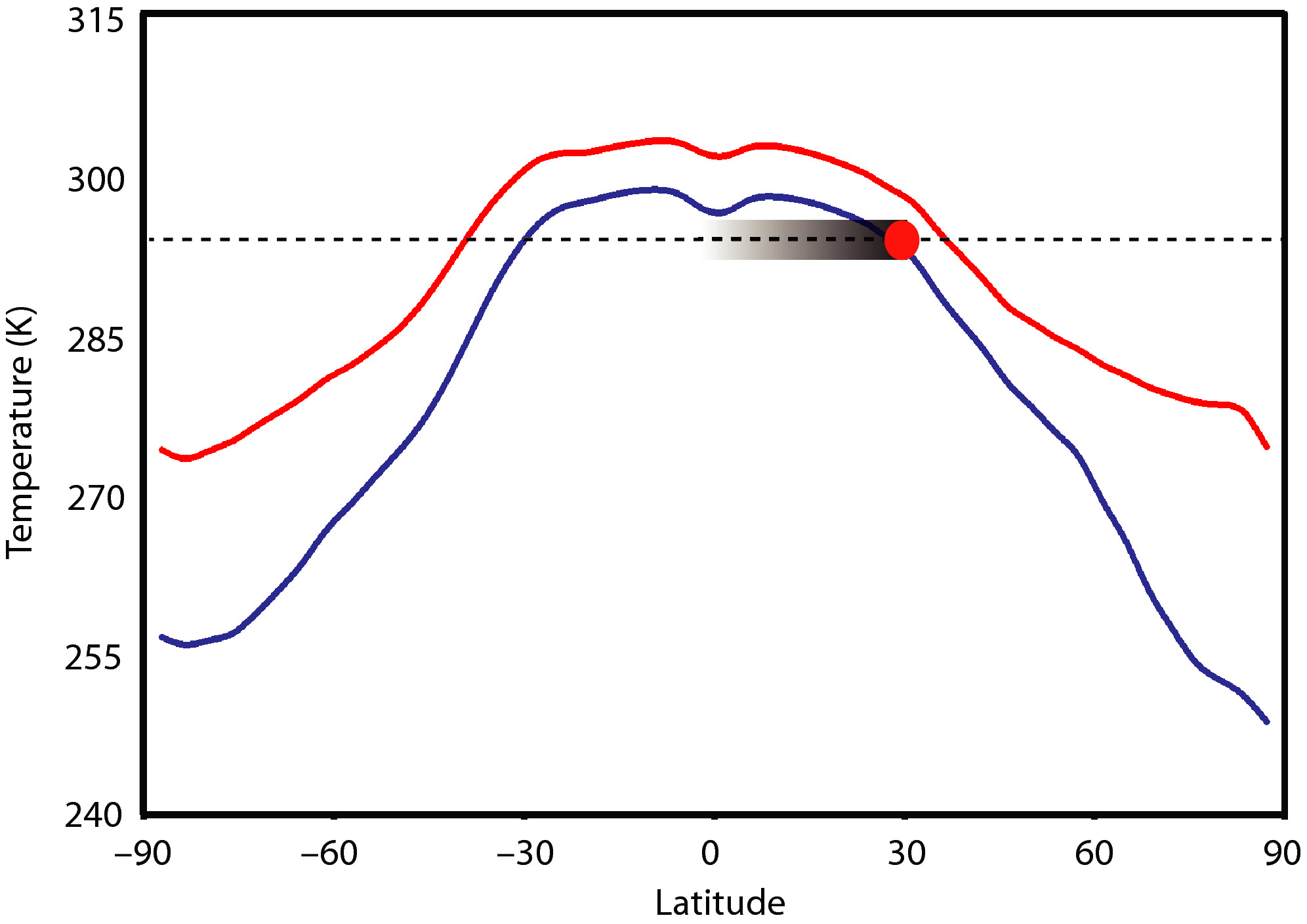
Graph showing average temperatures during the Mesoproterozoic. Blue line uses CO_{2} concentration 5 times modern day, red line 10 times, and red dot shows average temperature range at the tropics.

There is little evidence of significant climatic variability during this time period. Climate was likely not primarily dictated by solar luminosity because the Sun was 5–18% less luminous than it is today, but there is no evidence that Earth's climate was significantly cooler. In fact, the Boring Billion seems to lack any evidence of prolonged glaciations, which can be observed at regular periodicity in other parts of Earth's geologic history. High CO_{2} could not have been a main driver for warming because levels would have needed to be 30 to 100 times greater than pre-industrial levels and produced substantial ocean acidification to prevent ice formation, which also did not occur. Mesoproterozoic CO_{2} levels may have been comparable to those of the Phanerozoic eon, perhaps 7 to 10 times higher than modern levels. The first record of ice from this time period was reported in 2020 from the 1 Ga Scottish Diabaig Formation in the Torridon Group, where dropstone formations were likely formed by debris from ice rafting; the area, then situated between 35–50°S, was a (possibly upland) lake which is thought to have frozen over in the winter and melted in the summer, rafting occurring in the spring melt.

A higher abundance of other greenhouse gases, namely methane produced by prokaryotes, may have compensated for the low CO_{2} levels; a largely ice-free world achieved by an atmospheric methane concentration of 140 parts per million (ppm). Methanogenic prokaryotes could not have produced so much methane, implying some other greenhouse gas, probably nitrous oxide (laughing gas), was elevated, perhaps to 3 ppm (10 times today's levels). Based on presumed greenhouse gas concentrations, equatorial temperatures during the Mesoproterozoic may have been about 295–300 K (22–27 °C; 71–80 °F), in the tropics 290 K (17 °C; 62 °F), at 60° 265–280 K (−8–7 °C; 17–44 °F), and the poles 250–275 K (−23–2 °C; −10–35 °F); and the global average temperature about 19 °C (66 °F), which is 4 °C (7.2 °F) warmer than today. Temperatures at the poles dropped below freezing in winter, allowing for temporary sea ice formation and snowfall, but there were likely no permanent ice sheets.

It has also been proposed that, because the intensity of cosmic rays has been shown to be positively correlated to cloud cover, and cloud cover reflects light into space and reduces global temperatures, lower rates of bombardment during this time due to reduced star formation in the galaxy caused less cloud cover and prevented glaciation events, maintaining a warm climate. Also, some combination of weathering intensity which would have reduced CO_{2} levels by oxidation of exposed metals, cooling of the mantle and reduced geothermal heat and volcanism, and increasing solar intensity and solar heat may have reached an equilibrium, barring ice formation.

Conversely, glacial movements over a billion years ago may not have left many remnants today, and an apparent lack of evidence could be due to the incompleteness of the fossil record rather than absence. Further, the low oxygen and solar intensity levels may have prevented the formation of the ozone layer, preventing greenhouse gasses from being trapped in the atmosphere and heating the Earth via the greenhouse effect, which would have caused glaciation. Though not much oxygen is necessary to sustain the ozone layer, and levels during the Boring Billion may have been high enough for it, the Earth may have been more heavily bombarded by UV radiation than today.

== Oceanic composition ==
The oceans seem to have had low concentrations of key nutrients thought to be necessary for complex life, namely molybdenum, iron, nitrogen, and phosphorus, in large part due to a lack of oxygen and resultant oxidation necessary for these geochemical cycles. Nutrients could have been more abundant in terrestrial environments, such as lakes or nearshore environments closer to continental runoff.

In general, the oceans may have had an oxygenated surface layer, a sulfidic middle layer, and suboxic bottom layer. The predominantly sulfidic composition may have caused the oceans to be a black-and milky-turquoise color instead of blue.

=== Oxygen ===
Earth's geologic record indicates two events associated with significant increases in oxygen levels on Earth, with one occurring between 2.4 and 2.1 Ga, known as the Great Oxidation Event (GOE), and the second occurring an approximate 0.8 Ga, known as the Neoproterozoic Oxygenation Event (NOE). The canonical interpretation is that it represents an intermediary period where the Boring Billion is thought to have had low oxygen levels (with minor fluctuations), leading to widespread anoxic waters. More recent work has highlighted that the evidence for a large drop in oxygen levels after the GOE remains inconclusive and thus the boring billion may instead represent an extension of stabilized GOE oxygen levels.

The oceans may have been distinctly stratified, with surface water being oxygenated and deep water being suboxic (less than 1 μM oxygen), the latter possibly maintained by lower levels of hydrogen (H_{2}) and H_{2}S output by deep sea hydrothermal vents which otherwise would have been chemically reduced by the oxygen, i.e., euxinic waters. Even in the shallowest waters, significant quantities of oxygen may have been restricted mainly to areas near the coast. The decomposition of sinking organic matter would have also leached oxygen from deep waters.

The sudden drop in O_{2} after the Great Oxygenation Event—indicated by δ13C levels to have been a loss of 10 to 20 times the current volume of atmospheric oxygen—is known as the Lomagundi-Jatuli Event, and is the most prominent carbon isotope event in Earth's history. Oxygen levels may have been less than 0.1 to 1% of modern-day levels, which would have effectively stalled the evolution of complex life during the Boring Billion. However, a Mesoproterozoic Oxygenation Event (MOE), during which oxygen rose transiently to about 4% PAL at various points in time, is proposed to have occurred from 1.59 to 1.36 Ga. In particular, some evidence from the Gaoyuzhuang Formation suggests a rise in oxygen around 1.57 Ga, while the Velkerri Formation in the Roper Group of the Northern Territory of Australia, the Kaltasy Formation (Russian: Калтасинская свита) of Volgo-Uralia, Russia, and the Xiamaling Formation in the northern North China Craton indicate noticeable oxygenation around 1.4 Ga, although the degree to which this represents global oxygen levels is unclear. Estimations from gas analyses suggests the levels of oxygen in the atmosphere was 3.7% of modern levels. Oxic conditions would have become dominant at the NOE causing the proliferation of aerobic activity over anaerobic, but widespread suboxic and anoxic conditions likely lasted until about 0.55 Ga corresponding with Ediacaran biota and the Cambrian explosion.

=== Sulfur ===
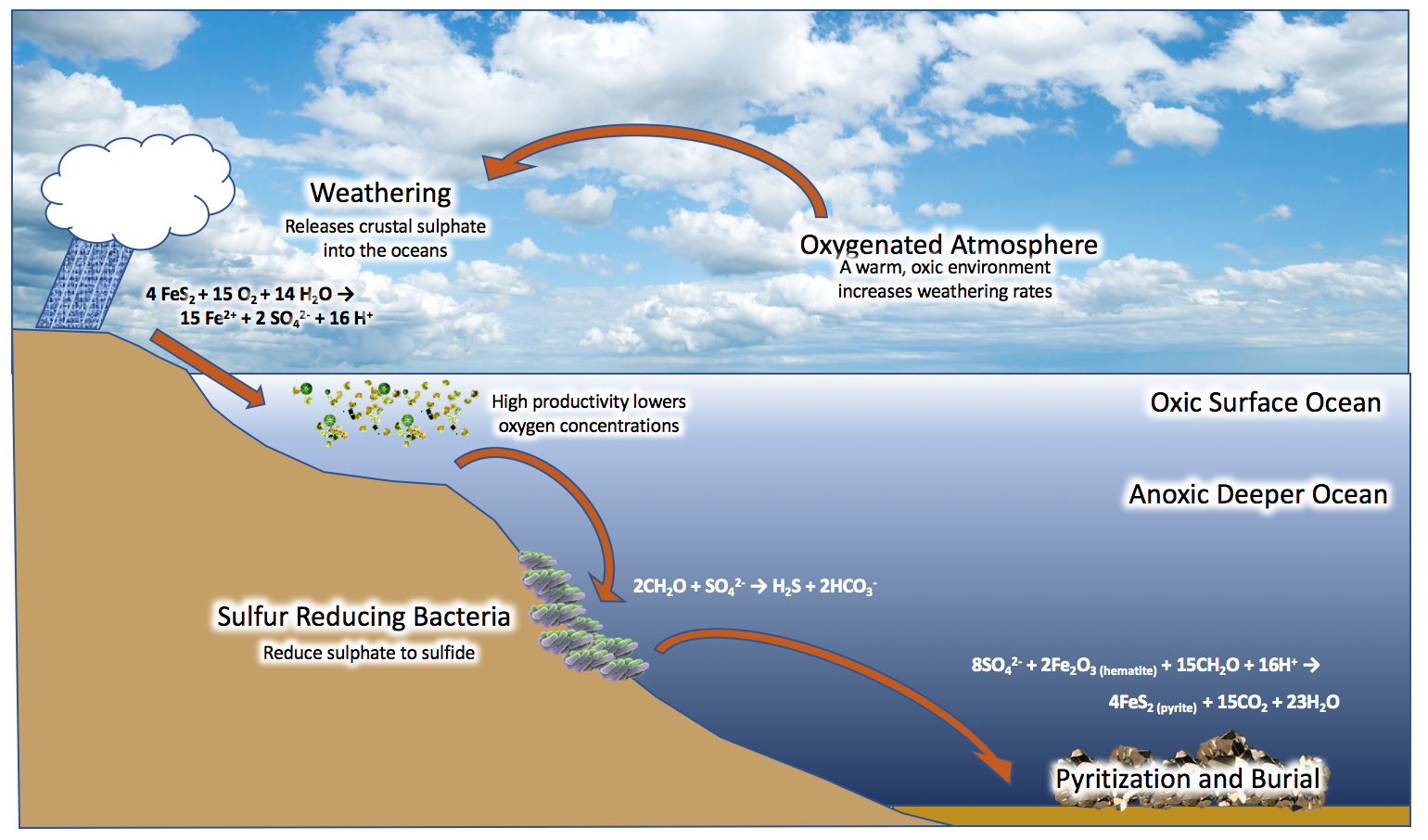
Diagram of how euxinic conditions form

In 1998, geologist Donald Canfield proposed what is now known as the Canfield ocean hypothesis. Canfield claimed that increasing levels of oxygen in the atmosphere at the Great Oxygenation Event would have reacted with and oxidized continental iron pyrite (FeS_{2}) deposits, with sulfate (SO_{4}^{2−}) as a byproduct, which was transported into the sea. Sulfate-reducing microorganisms converted this to hydrogen sulfide (H_{2}S), dividing the ocean into a somewhat oxic surface layer, and a sulfidic layer beneath, with anoxygenic bacteria living at the border, metabolizing the H_{2}S and creating sulfur as a waste product. This created widespread euxinic conditions in middle-waters, an anoxic state with a high sulfur concentration, which was maintained by the bacteria. Many deposits from the Boring Billion contain mercury isotopic ratios characteristic of photic zone euxinia. More systematic geochemical study of the Mid-Proterozoic indicates that the oceans were largely ferruginous with a thin surface layer of weakly oxygenated waters, and euxinia may have occurred over relatively small areas, perhaps less than 7% of the seafloor. The very low concentrations of molybdenum in the Mesoproterozoic could sufficiently be explained even with such a relatively low percentage of the seafloor being euxinic. Euxinia expanded and contracted, sometimes reaching the photic zone and at other times being relegated to deeper waters. Evidence from the McArthur Basin of northern Australia reveals that intracontinental settings in particular were low in sulphide intermittently.

=== Iron ===
Among rocks dating to the Boring Billion, there is a conspicuous lack of banded iron formations, which are believed to form from iron in the upper water column (sourced from the deep ocean) reacting with oxygen and precipitating out of the water. They seemingly cease around the world after 1.85 Ga. Canfield argued that oceanic SO^{2−}_{4} reduced all the iron in the anoxic deep sea. Iron could have been metabolized by anoxygenic bacteria. It has also been proposed that the 1.85 Ga Sudbury meteor impact mixed the previously stratified ocean via tsunamis, interaction between vaporized seawater and the oxygenated atmosphere, oceanic cavitation, and massive runoff of destroyed continental margins into the sea. Resultant suboxic deep waters (due to oxygenated surface water mixing with previously anoxic deep water) would have oxidized deep-water iron, preventing it from being transported and deposited on continental margins.

Nonetheless, iron-rich waters did exist, such as the 1.4 Ga Xiamaling Formation of Northern China, which perhaps was fed by deep water hydrothermal vents. Iron-rich conditions also indicate anoxic bottom water in this area, as oxic conditions would have oxidized all the iron.

== Lifeforms ==
Low nutrient abundance may have facilitated photosymbiosis—where one organism is capable of photosynthesis and the other metabolizes the waste product—among prokaryotes (bacteria and archaea), and the emergence of eukaryotes. Bacteria, Archaea, and Eukaryota are the three domains, the highest taxonomic ranking. Eukaryotes are distinguished from prokaryotes by a nucleus and membrane-bound organelles, and almost all multicellular organisms are eukaryotes.

=== Prokaryotes ===
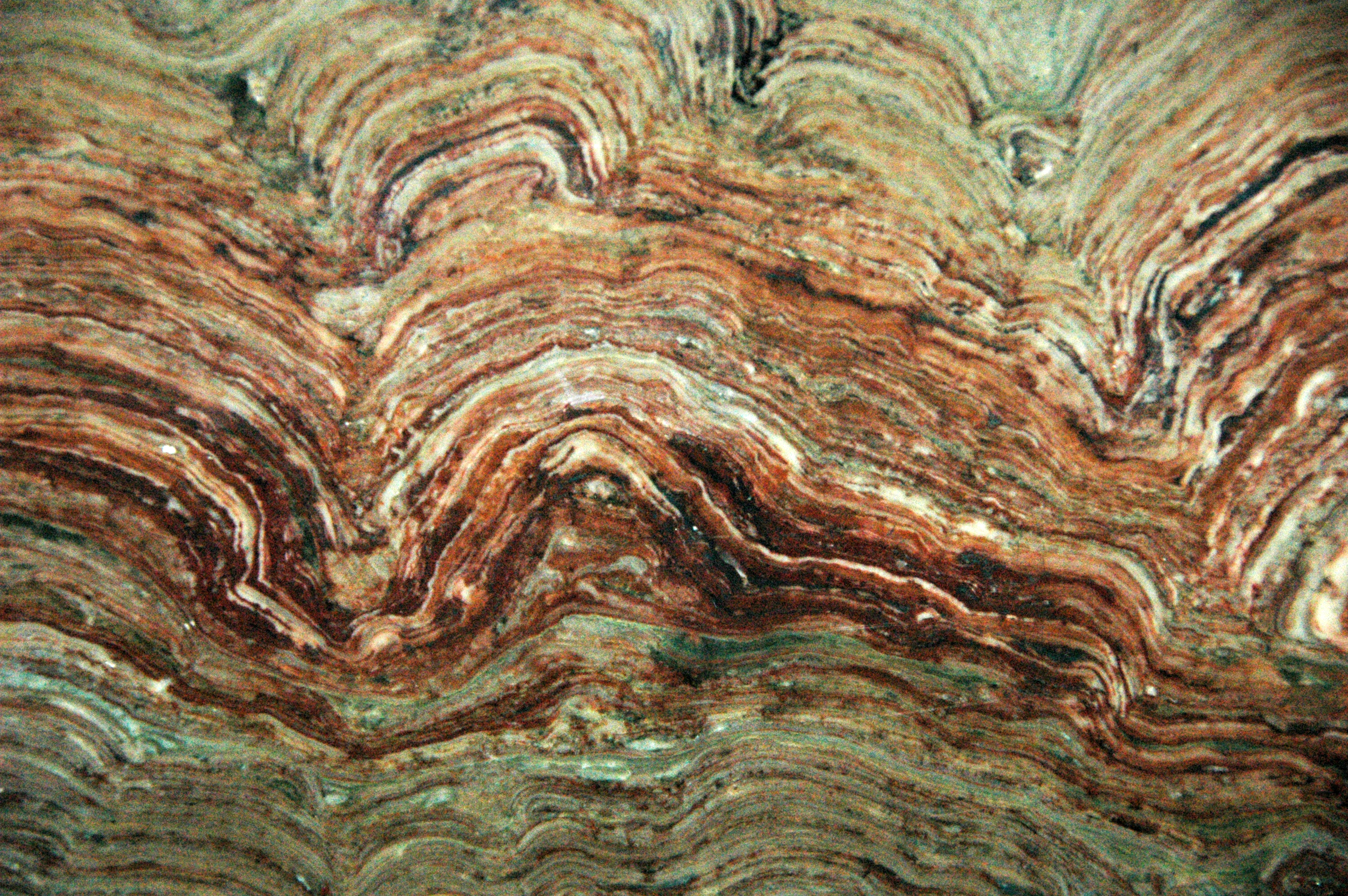
1.44 Ga stromatolite from Glacier National Park, Montana

Prokaryotes were the dominant lifeforms throughout the Boring Billion. Microfossils indicate the presence of cyanobacteria, green and purple sulfur bacteria, methane-producing archaea, sulfate-metabolizing bacteria, methane-metabolizing archaea or bacteria, iron-metabolizing bacteria, nitrogen-metabolizing bacteria, and anoxygenic photosynthetic bacteria.

Anoxygenic cyanobacteria are thought to have been the dominant photosynthesizers, metabolizing the abundant H_{2}S in the oceans. In iron-rich waters, cyanobacteria may have suffered from iron poisoning, especially in offshore waters where iron-rich deep water mixed with surface waters, and thus were outcompeted by other bacteria which could metabolize both iron and H_{2}S. However, iron poisoning could have been abated by silica-rich waters or biomineralization of iron within the cell.

Unicellular planktonic lineages of cyanobacteria evolved in freshwater during the middle of the Mesoproterozoic, and during the Neoproterozoic both benthic marine and some freshwater ancestors gave rise to marine planktonic cyanobacteria (both nitrogen-fixing and non-nitrogen fixing), contributing to the oxygenation of the Pre-Cambrian oceans.

Research on cyanobacteria in the laboratory has shown that the enzyme nitrogenase, which is used to fix atmospheric nitrogen, stops working when oxygen levels are higher than 10% of current atmospheric levels. The absence of nitrogen due to an increased amount of oxygen would have created a negative feedback loop where atmospheric oxygen levels stabilised at 2%, which began to change about 600 million years ago when land plants started releasing oxygen. By 408 million years ago, nitrogen fixating cyanobacteria had evolved heterocysts to protect their nitrogenase from oxygen.

=== Eukaryotes ===
Eukaryotes may have arisen around the beginning of the Boring Billion, coinciding with the accretion of Columbia, which could have somehow increased oceanic oxygen levels. Although there have been claimed records of eukaryotes as early as 2.1 billion years ago, these have been considered questionable, with the oldest unambiguous eukaryote remains dating to around 1.8-1.6 billion years ago in China. Following this, eukaryotic evolution was rather slow, possibly due to the euxinic conditions of the Canfield ocean and a lack of key nutrients and metals which prevented large, complex life with high energy requirements from evolving. Euxinic conditions would have also decreased the solubility of iron and molybdenum, essential metals in nitrogen fixation. A lack of dissolved nitrogen would have favored prokaryotes over eukaryotes, as the former can metabolize gaseous nitrogen. An alternative hypothesis for the lack of diversification among eukaryotes implicates high temperatures during the Boring Billion rather than low oxygen levels, positing that the fact that oxygenation events prior to the Late Neoproterozoic did not kickstart eukaryotic evolution suggests it was not the main limiting factor inhibiting it.

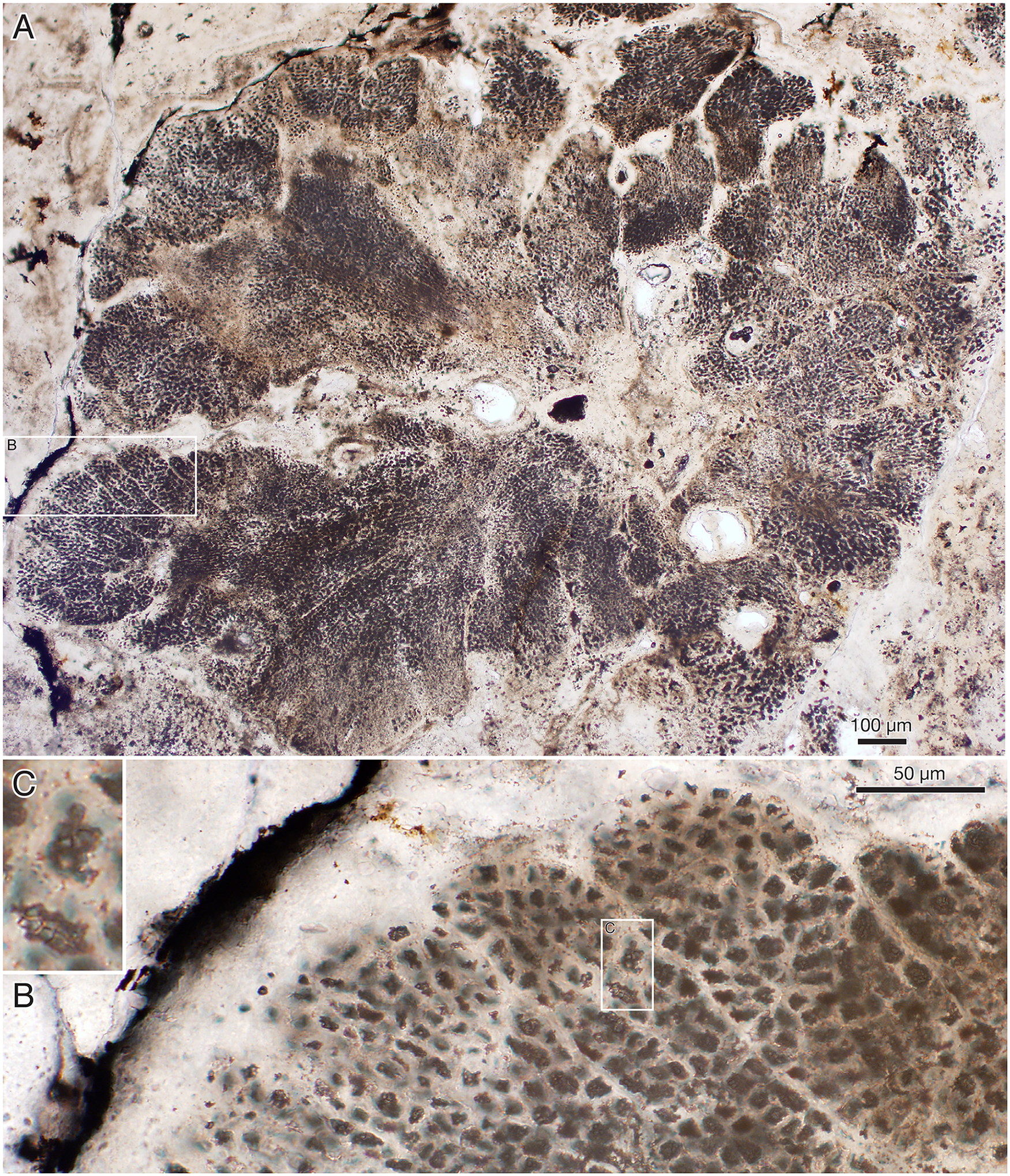
1.6 Ga Ramathallus fossil, the earliest known red alga

Nonetheless, the diversification of crown group eukaryotic macroorganisms seems to have started about 1.6–1 Ga, seemingly coinciding with an increase in key nutrient concentrations. According to molecular clock analysis, plants diverged from animals and fungi about 1.6 Ga; animals and fungi about 1.5 Ga; Sponges from other animals diverged about 1.35 Ga; Bilaterians and cnidarians (animals respectively with and without bilateral symmetry) about 1.3 Ga; and Ascomycota and Basidiomycota (the two divisions of the fungus subkingdom Dikarya) 0.97 Ga. The paper's authors state that their time estimates disagree with the scientific consensus.

Fossils from the late Palaeoproterozoic and early Mesoproterozoic of the Vindhyan sedimentary basin of India, the Ruyang Group of North China, and the Kotuikan Formation of the Anabar Shield of Siberia, among other places, indicate high rates (by pre-Ediacaran standards) of eukaryotic diversification between 1.7 and 1.4 Ga, although much of this diversity is represented by previously unknown, no longer existing clades of eukaryotes. The earliest known red algae mats date to 1.6 Ga. The earliest known fungus dates to 1.01–0.89 Ga from Northern Canada. Multicellular eukaryotes, thought to be the descendants of colonial unicellular aggregates, had probably evolved about 2–1.4 Ga. Likewise, early multicellular eukaryotes likely mainly aggregated into stromatolite mats.

The red alga Bangiomorpha is the earliest known sexually reproducing and meiotic lifeform, and evolved by 1.047 Ga. Based on this, these adaptations evolved between ca. 2–1.4 Ga. Alternatively, these may have evolved well before the last common ancestor of eukaryotes given that meiosis is performed using the same proteins in all eukaryotes, perhaps stretching to as far back as the hypothesized RNA world.

Cell organelles probably originated from free-living cyanobacteria (symbiogenesis) possibly after the evolution of phagocytosis (engulfing other cells) with the removal of the rigid cell wall which was only necessary for asexual reproduction. Mitochondria had already evolved in the Great Oxygenation Event, but plastids used in primoplants for photosynthesis are thought to have appeared about 1.6–1.5 Ga. Histones likely appeared during the Boring Billion to help organize and package the increasing amount of DNA in eukaryotic cells into nucleosomes. Hydrogenosomes used in anaerobic activity may have originated in this time from an archaeon.

Given the evolutionary landmarks achieved by eukaryotes, this time period could be considered an important precursor to the Cambrian explosion about 0.54 Ga, and the evolution of relatively large, complex life.

=== Ecology ===
Due to the marginalization of large food particles, such as algae, in favor of cyanobacteria and prokaryotes which do not transmit as much energy to higher trophic levels, a complex food web likely did not form, and large lifeforms with high energy demands could not evolve. Such a food web probably only sustained a small number of protists as, in a sense, apex predators.

The presumably oxygenic photosynthetic eukaryotic acritarchs, perhaps a type of microalga, inhabited the Mesoproterozoic surface waters. Their population may have been largely limited by nutrient availability rather than predation because species have been reported to have survived for hundreds of millions of years, but after 1 Ga, species duration dropped to about 100 Ma, perhaps due to increased herbivory by early protists. This is consistent with species survival dropping to 10 Ma just after the Cambrian explosion and the expansion of herbivorous animals.

The relatively low concentrations of molybdenum in the ocean throughout the Boring Billion have been suggested as a major limiting factor that kept populations of open ocean nitrogen fixing microorganisms, which require molybdenum to produce nitrogenases, low, although freshwater and coastal environments close to riverine sources of dissolved molybdenum may have still hosted significant communities of nitrogen fixers. The low rate of nitrogen fixation, which only ended during the Cryogenian with the evolution of planktonic nitrogen fixers, meant that free ammonium was in short supply across this time interval, severely constraining the evolution and diversification of multicellular biota.

=== Life on land ===
Some of the earliest evidence of the prokaryotic colonization of land dates to before 3 Ga, possibly as early as 3.5 Ga. During the Boring Billion, land may have been inhabited mainly by cyanobacterial mats. Dust would have supplied an abundance of nutrients and a means of dispersal for surface-dwelling microbes, though microbial communities could have also formed in caves and freshwater lakes and rivers. By 1.2 Ga, microbial communities may have been abundant enough to have affected weathering, erosion, sedimentation, and various geochemical cycles, and expansive microbial mats could indicate biological soil crust was abundant.

The earliest terrestrial eukaryotes may have been lichen fungi about 1.3 Ga, which grazed on the microbial mats. Abundant eukaryotic microfossils from the freshwater Scottish Torridon Group seems to indicate eukaryotic dominance in non-marine habitats by 1 Ga, probably due to increased nutrient availability in areas closer to the continents and continental runoff. These lichen may have later facilitated plant colonization 0.75 Ga in some manner. A massive increase in terrestrial photosynthetic biomass seems to have occurred about 0.85 Ga, indicated by a flux in terrestrially-sourced carbon, which may have increased oxygen levels enough to support an expansion of multicellular eukaryotes.

== See also ==
- Precambrian – History of Earth 4600–539 million years ago
- Ediacaran biota – Life of the Ediacaran period
- Francevillian biota – Possible Palaeoproterozoic multicellular fossils from Gabon
- L'Atalante basin – Anoxic hypersaline brine basin at the bottom of the Mediterranean Sea
- Snowball Earth – Worldwide glaciation episodes during the Proterozoic eon
- The natural nuclear fission reactors at what is now Oklo, Gabon were active in this era
- Geologic time scale
