= Robert Berner =

American scientist

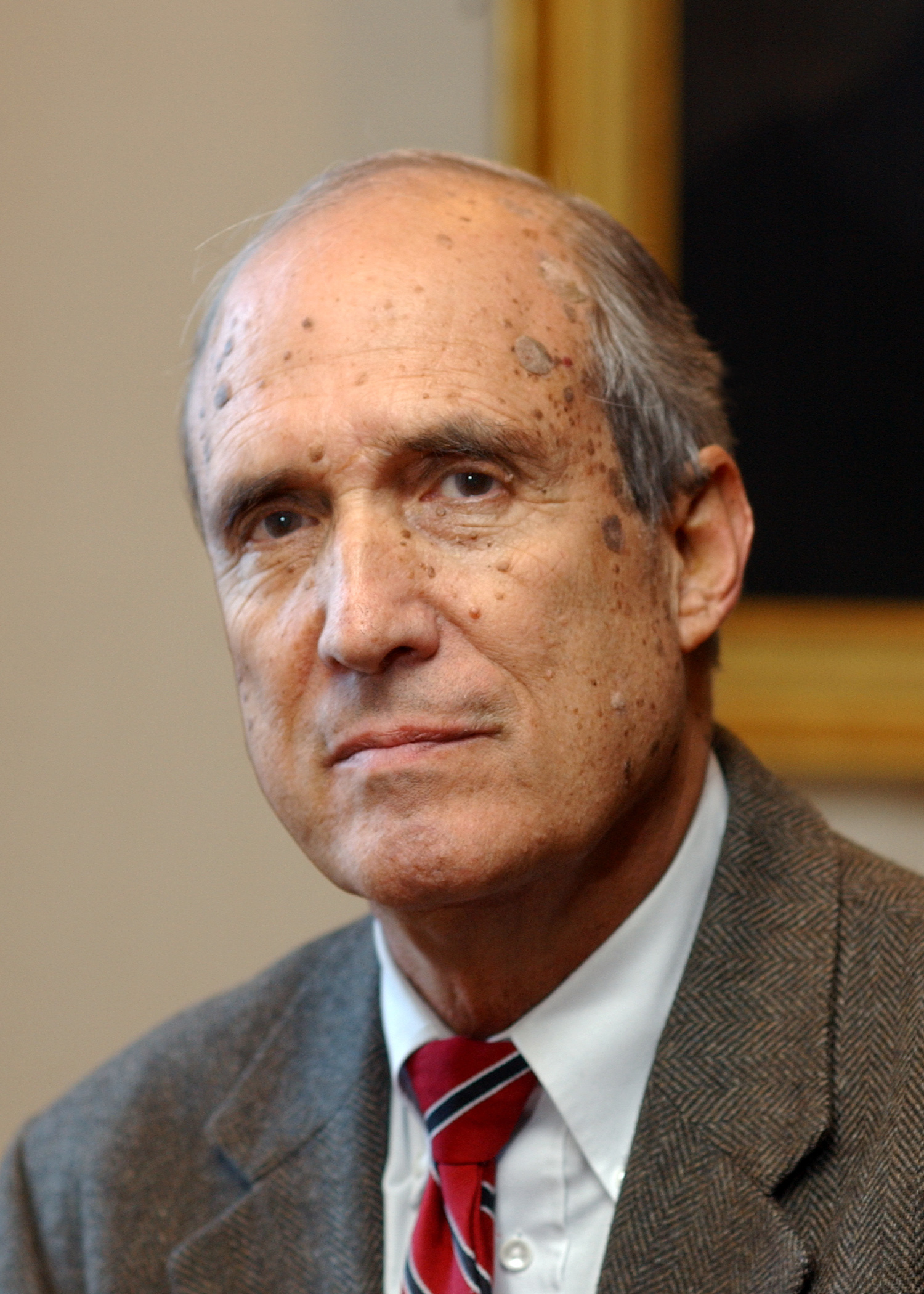
- Born: Robert Arbuckle Berner; November 25, 1935; Erie, Pennsylvania
- Died: January 10, 2015 (aged 79); New Haven, Connecticut
- Education: University of Michigan (BS, MS); Harvard University (PhD)
- Known for: BLAG model; GEOCARB model
- Awards: Guggenheim Fellow (1972); V. M. Goldschmidt Award (1995); Murchison Medal (1996); Benjamin Franklin Medal (2013)
- Scientific career
- Fields: Geochemistry; Paleoclimate; Carbon cycle; Carbonates; Diagenesis
- Workplaces: Yale University; Scripps Institution of Oceanography
- Notable students: Donald Canfield
- Website: earth.yale.edu/robert-berner-remembrance

Robert Arbuckle Berner (November 25, 1935 – January 10, 2015) was an American scientist known for his contributions to the modeling of the carbon cycle. He taught Geology and Geophysics from 1965 to 2007 at Yale University, where he latterly served as Professor Emeritus until his death. His work on sedimentary rocks led to the co-founding of the BLAG model of atmospheric carbon dioxide, which takes into account both geochemical and biological contributions to the carbon cycle.

== Early life ==
Berner was born on November 25, 1935, in Erie, Pennsylvania, to Paul Nau Berner and Priscilla (Arbuckle) Berner. He was encouraged to develop an interest in geology by his older brother (and now deceased geologist) Paul. Bob initially attended Purdue University but soon transferred to the University of Michigan, where he earned his bachelor's degree in 1958 and his master's degree in 1959. Next he attended Harvard University where in 1962 he earned his Ph.D. in Geology.

== Academic career and research ==
In 1962, Berner won a fellowship to do research at the Scripps Institute of Oceanography in San Diego, California. From 1963 until 1965, he worked as an assistant professor at the University of Chicago. Beginning in 1965, he taught at Yale University where he became the Alan M. Bateman Professor in 1987, a position he held until his retirement in 2007.

Berner's early research focused on the application of chemical thermodynamics and kinetics on sediments and sedimentary rocks. Results from these experiments led to his 1971 book Principles of Chemical Sedimentology. In 1980, Berner authored Early Diagenesis: A Theoretical Approach which was quoted so often that the Institute for Scientific Information declared it a Science Citation Classic. Noting the role that sedimentary rocks at or near the Earth's surface play in the carbon cycle, Berner, along with Tony Lasaga, and Bob Garrels put forth the BLAG model of the carbon cycle in 1983 (BLAG from the letters of their last names). BLAG attempts to model variations of atmospheric carbon dioxide back through geologic time to the Cretaceous using both Geochemical and Biological carbon cycles. Berner subsequently extended this idea with the GEOCARB model, which attempts to model such variations back to the Phanerozoic. Berner's later research focused on computer modeling of carbon and sulfur cycles, as well as the effects of atmospheric carbon dioxide and oxygen on the paleoclimate.

== Personal life ==
In 1959, Berner married fellow Geology graduate student Elizabeth Marshall Kay. They have three children, and coauthored a book together in 1995, Global Environment: Water, Air, and Geochemical Cycles. Berner's father-in-law, Professor Marshall Kay was a well-known academic geologist as well.

Berner died on January 10, 2015, following a long illness.

== Awards and honors ==
- Member of the National Academy of Sciences
- Most-cited Scientist, Institute for Science Information
- Sverdrup Postdoctoral Fellow, Scripps Institute of Oceanography, 1962-1963
- Alfred P. Sloan Research Fellowship in Chemistry, Alfred P. Sloan Foundation, 1968
- Mineralogical Society of America Award, 1971
- Guggenheim Fellow in Earth Science, John Simon Guggenheim Memorial Foundation, 1972
- Doctor Honoris Causa, Université Aix-Marseille III, 1991
- A.G. Huntsman Award for Excellence in the Marine Sciences, 1993
- V. M. Goldschmidt Medal, The Geochemical Society, 1995
- Murchison Medal, Geological Society of London, 1996
- Arthur L. Day Medal, Geological Society of America, 1996
- Bownocker Medal, Ohio State University 2001
- Vernadsky Medal, International Association of GeoChemistry, 2012
- Benjamin Franklin Medal in Earth and Environmental Science, Franklin Institute, 2013
