= Isorenieratene =

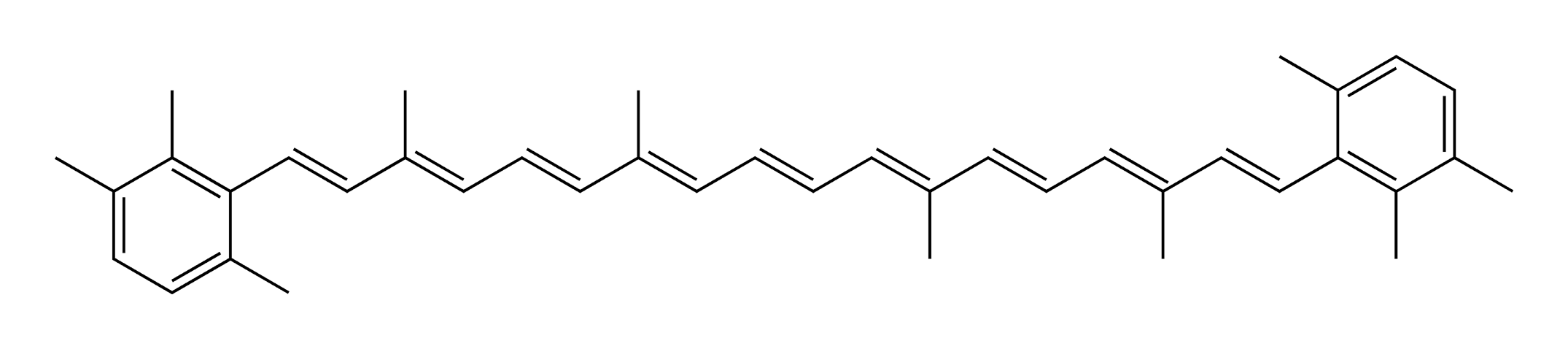

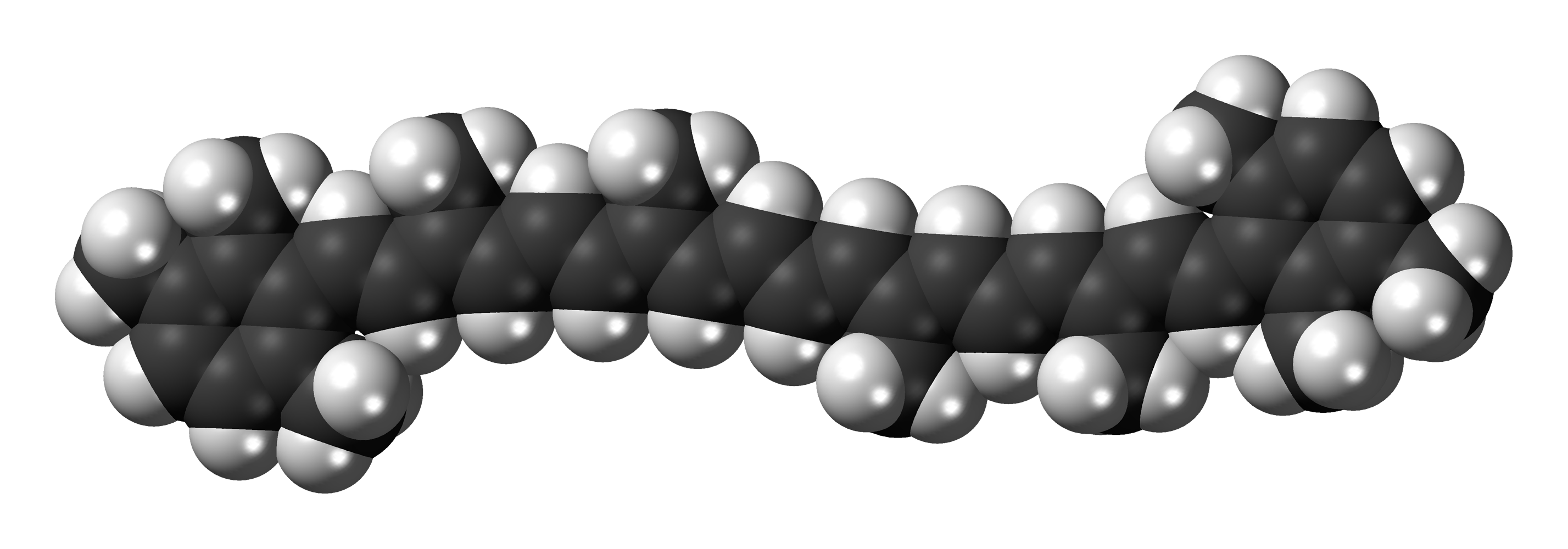

Names
- IUPAC name φ,φ-Carotene
- Systematic IUPAC name 1,2,4-trimethyl-3-[(1E,3E,5E,7E,9E,11E,13E,15E,17E)-3,7,12,16-tetramethyl-18-(2,3,6-trimethylphenyl)octadeca-1,3,5,7,9,11,13,15,17-nonaenyl]benzene

Identifiers
CAS Number	524-01-6
3D model (JSmol)	Interactive image
ChemSpider	8160010
KEGG	C15943
PubChem CID	9984420
UNII	L8X7K8799E
CompTox Dashboard (EPA)	DTXSID60433638
- InChI: InChI=1S/C40H48/c1-29(17-13-19-31(3)21-27-39-35(7)25-23-33(5)37(39)9)15-11-12-16-30(2)18-14-20-32(4)22-28-40-36(8)26-24-34(6)38(40)10/h11-28H,1-10H3/b12-11+,17-13+,18-14+,27-21+,28-22+,29-15+,30-16+,31-19+,32-20+ Key: ZCIHMQAPACOQHT-YSEOPJLNSA-N; InChI=1/C40H48/c1-29(17-13-19-31(3)21-27-39-35(7)25-23-33(5)37(39)9)15-11-12-16-30(2)18-14-20-32(4)22-28-40-36(8)26-24-34(6)38(40)10/h11-28H,1-10H3/b12-11+,17-13+,18-14+,27-21+,28-22+,29-15+,30-16+,31-19+,32-20+ Key: ZCIHMQAPACOQHT-YSEOPJLNBL
- SMILES: CC1=C(C(=C(C=C1)C)/C=C/C(=C/C=C/C(=C/C=C/C=C(/C=C/C=C(/C=C/C2=C(C=CC(=C2C)C)C)\C)\C)/C)/C)C

Properties
Chemical formula	C_{40}H_{48}
Molar mass	528.824 g·mol^{−1}
Appearance	purple-red crystalline solid
Melting point	199 to 200 °C (390 to 392 °F; 472 to 473 K)
- Except where otherwise noted, data are given for materials in their standard state (at 25 °C [77 °F], 100 kPa). verify (what is ?) Infobox references

Isorenieratene /ˌaɪsoʊrəˈnɪərətiːn/ is a carotenoid light-harvesting pigment produced exclusively by the genus Chlorobium, which are the brown-colored strains of the family of green sulfur bacteria (Chlorobiaceae). Green sulfur bacteria are anaerobic photoautotrophic organisms, meaning they perform photosynthesis in the absence of oxygen using hydrogen sulfide in the following reaction:

H_{2}S + CO_{2} → SO^{2−}_{4} + organic compounds

Such anoxygenic photosynthesis requires reduced sulfur and light; thus, this metabolism occurs only in strictly photic and euxinic environments. Therefore, the discovery of isorenieratene and its derivatives in sediments and rocks are helpful biomarkers to identify euxinic water columns in the photic zone.

== Structure ==
Isorenieratene has the chemical formula C_{40}H_{48}. It is a diaromatic carotenoid with a regularly-linked isoprenoid chain, except for a single tail-to-tail linkage in the middle of the molecule. Isorenieratene has a characteristic 1-alkyl-2,3,6-trimethyl substitution pattern on the aromatic rings, which helps identify the molecule. The nine conjugated double bonds on the isoprenoid backbone are all in the trans configuration and make the molecule highly reactive with reduced inorganic sulfur species. The molecule is hydrophobic and insoluble in water, like most other carotenoids. Isorenieratene is generally non-toxic.

== Biological sources ==
Isorenieratene was first discovered when isolated from the orange-colored sponge Reniera japonica. Marine sponges are brilliantly colored due to the occurrence of several carotenoids and their association with symbionts such as bacteria or algae. Therefore, isorenieratene in sponges is assumed to originate from the symbiosis between sponges and green sulfur bacteria (Chlorobiaceae).

Green sulfur bacteria live in euxinic environments, often at the chemocline, where the light flux is present but low. To increase their metabolic efficiency, they have developed a chlorosome, a membrane-bound antenna with bacteriochlorophyll c, d, or e. The brown-colored strain of Chlorobiaceae has bacteriochlorophyll e in its chlorosome, which primarily makes isorenieratene. It is speculated that isorenieratene and other related carotenoids are adaptations that help organisms live under low-light conditions. Green sulfur bacteria fix carbon through the reverse tricarboxylic acid cycle (TCA), resulting in the produced biomass, including isorenieratene, being anomalously enriched in carbon-13 (^{13}C) compared to other algal biomass by about 15 per mil. δ^{13}C of green sulfur bacteria biomass ranges between –9 and –21 per mil. Isorenieratene is relatively uncommon but of great significance when encountered. It is a powerful proxy for euxinic conditions in the photic zone both today and in the geologic record.

== Environmental distribution ==
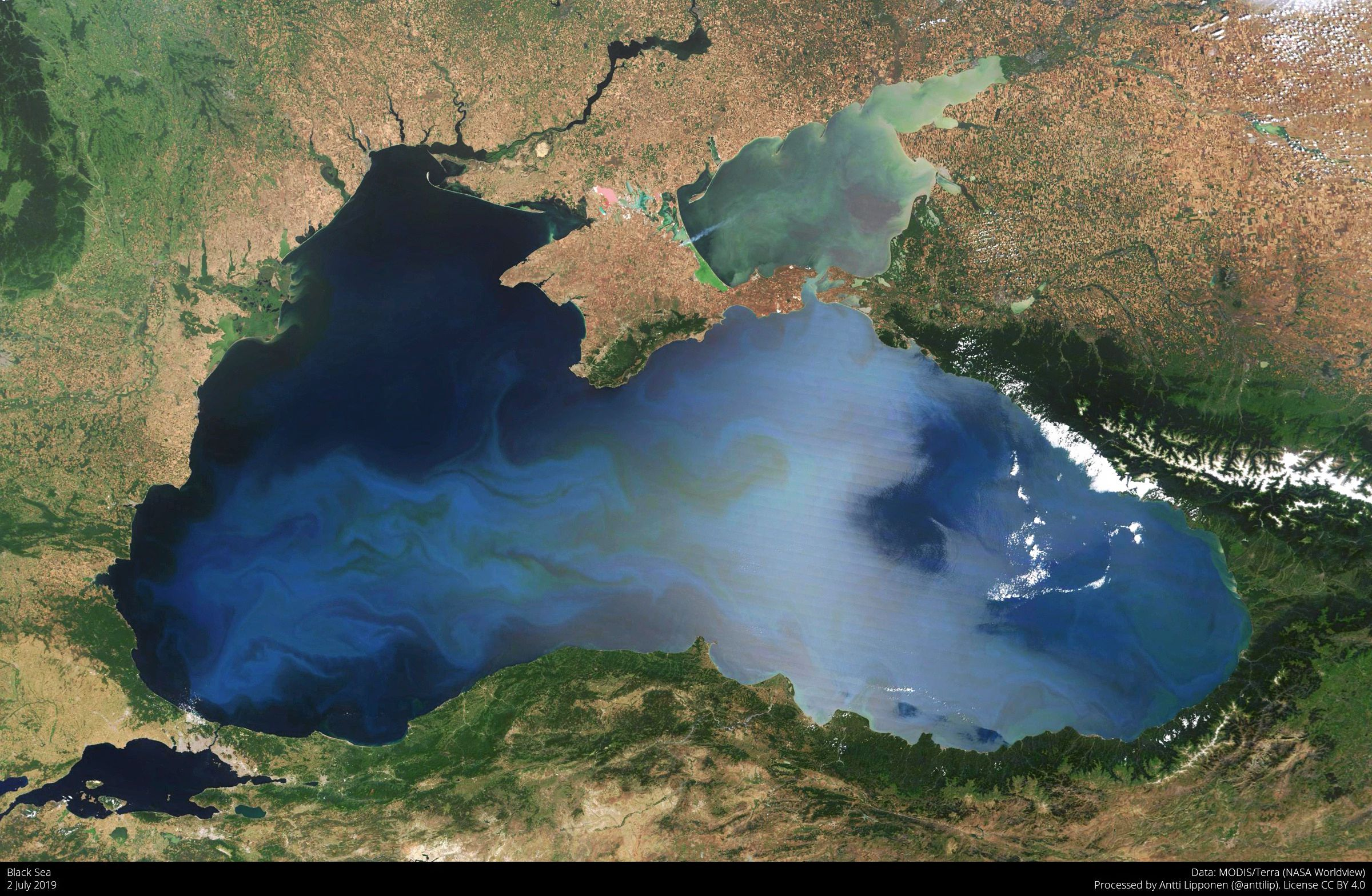
The Black Sea is the largest anoxic body of water on Earth today, and home to many green sulfur bacteria colonies.

The combination of conditions in which green sulfur bacteria live and, thereby, where isorenieratene is found are limited today. Most of these locations are restricted water basins with highly stratified waters, allowing for anoxia development in the lower layers and H_{2}S accumulation. The Black Sea is one such water basin where the hydrogen sulfide interface, or the chemocline, has moved up in the photic zone, and high concentrations of green sulfur bacteria and isorenieratene are found. Other modern-day environments include meromictic lakes, restricted fjords, and some marine settings. Green sulfur bacteria are found to play a role in coral ecosystems and have been documented to live on coral and sponges as possible symbionts.

Several cases have been found where green sulfur bacteria with bacteriochlorophyll e are abundant, but no isorenieratene was documented. Green sulfur bacteria were found to live near a deep-sea hydrothermal vent off the coast of Mexico; however, the bacteria are no longer doing photosynthesis at this depth, and no isorenieratene was isolated. In Fayetteville Green Lake (New York), green sulfur bacteria and bacteriochlorophyll e were abundant below the chemocline, yet the sediments lacked isorenieratene. These unexpected absences of isorenieratene call for continued exploration of the microbial ecology of biomarker production in modern environments.

== Preservation and measurement ==
Isorenieratene is generally poorly-preserved because its structure is susceptible to alteration and degradation. Upon diagenesis and catagenesis, isorenieratene may be transformed and produce various related products that still indicate photic zone euxinia in the depositional environment. The two main transformation processes are the saturation of double bonds to form isorenieratane and the rupture of the carbon chain resulting in smaller molecular fragments. Other alterations include sulphurization, cyclization, and aromatization.

== Use as a biomarker ==
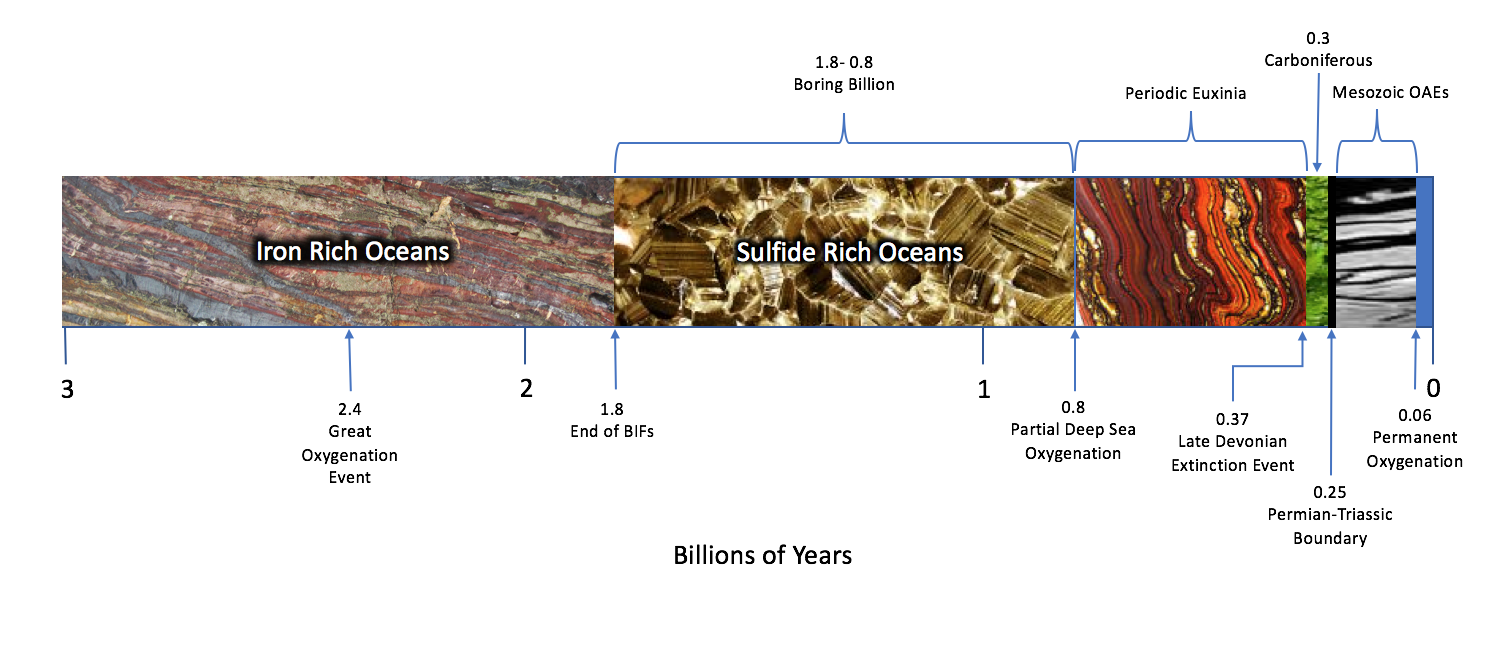
Occurrence of euxinic waters in early Earth history

While euxinic conditions are rare today, In the early history of the Earth, these conditions were thought to be present in all oceans at depths of about 100 m (330 ft). The detection of isorenieratene and green sulfur bacteria in the mid-Proterozoic has been used as evidence for the long-term euxinic conditions remaining in oceans after the Great Oxygenation Event. For example, the 1.64-Gyr-old Barney Creek Formation in northern Australia hosts many biomarkers, including isorenieratene, that signify that these rocks were deposited in a marine basin with anoxic, sulphidic, and highly-stratified deep waters with colonies of green and purple sulfur bacteria.

Isorenieratene derivatives have been identified in sedimentary rocks throughout the Paleozoic and Mesozoic, signifying that anoxygenic photosynthesis was a more common process in the past. Isorenieratene derivatives have also been isolated from many petroleum source rocks, suggesting euxinic conditions and anoxia are favorable for preserving organic matter, leading to forming of petroleum reservoirs. Additionally, the detection of isorenieratene derivatives during mass extinctions signifies that euxinic conditions may be common at such events. For example, the isolation of isorenieratene from rock units deposited during the Permian/Triassic Mass extinction, the deadliest mass extinction on Earth, was used as evidence for several pulses of widespread photic zone euxinia leading up to and during the extinction event.

== See also ==
- Carotenoids
- Biomarker
- Green sulfur bacteria
- Euxinia
