= Marshall Kay =

American geologist

George Marshall Kay
- Born: November 10, 1904; Paisley, Ontario
- Died: September 3, 1975 (aged 70); Englewood, New Jersey
- Education: Columbia University
- Known for: Stratigraphy
- Awards: Penrose Medal (1971)
- Scientific career
- Fields: Geology
- Workplaces: Columbia University

Marshall Kay (November 10, 1904 – September 4, 1975) was a geologist and professor at Columbia University. He is best known for his studies of the Ordovician of New York, Newfoundland, and Nevada, but his studies were global and he published widely on the stratigraphy of the middle and upper Ordovician. Kay's careful fieldwork provided much geological evidence for the theory of continental drift. He was awarded the Penrose Medal in 1971. Less well known is his work for the Manhattan Project, as a geologist searching for manganese deposits. Marshall's son Robert Kay of Cornell University, daughter Elizabeth (Kay) Berner of University of Connecticut and son-in-law Robert Berner of Yale University are also geology professors. His son Richard Kay of Duke University is a biological anthropologist and vertebrate paleontologist.

Kay received his Ph.D. from Columbia in 1929.

== Bibliography ==
- Marshall Kay, North American geosynclines (Memoir 48), Geological Society of America, 1951.
- Kay, Marshall; Colbert, Edwin (1965). Stratigraphy and Life History. New York, London, Sydney: John Wiley & Sons, Inc.
