= Canfield ocean =

Hypothetical middle to late Proterozoic ocean composition

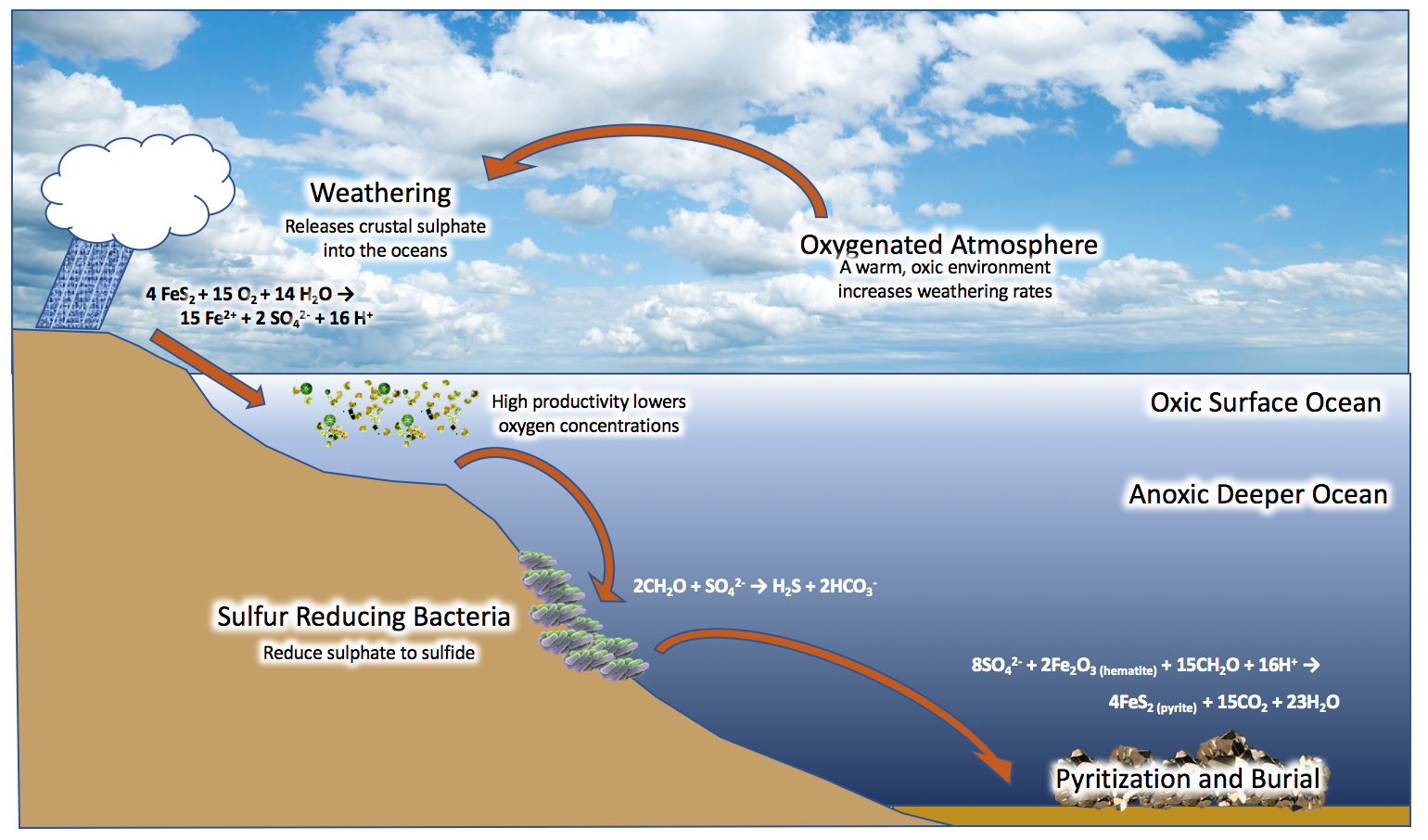
Diagram of the mechanisms hypothesized to have formed euxinic conditions in the deep ocean during the Boring Billion

The Canfield Ocean model was proposed by geochemist Donald Canfield to explain the composition of the ocean in the middle to late Proterozoic.

== History ==
In a paper published in 1998 in Nature, Canfield argued that the deep ocean was anoxic and sulfidic (also known as euxinic) during the time of the Boring Billion (1.8–0.8 billion years ago, Gya), and that those conditions ceased the mineral deposition of iron-rich banded iron formations (BIF) in ocean sediments. Prior to the Canfield Ocean theory, it was believed that the ocean becoming fully oxygenated during the Great Oxidation Event (GOE; ~2.46 Gya) was the mechanism that ceased BIF deposition.

== Formation ==
By the end of the GOE, oxygen levels in the atmosphere were as high as 10% of present-day levels. Under these conditions, the deep ocean would have likely remained anoxic. However, the atmosphere had enough oxygen to facilitate weathering of sulfate-containing terrestrial minerals, delivering sulfate (SO_{4}^{2-}) to the ocean through runoff. Sulfate was then reduced by microorganisms to produce hydrogen sulfide (H_{2}S):

$\ce{2CH2O + SO4^2- -> H2S + 2HCO3^-}$

By 1.8 Gya, sulfide (S^{2-}) concentrations were high enough to precipitate iron out of the deep ocean by binding with iron to form pyrite (FeS_{2}), effectively ending the formation of BIFs.

== Evidence ==
Most evidence for euxinic ocean conditions comes from stable isotope ratios found in sediment records. For example, δ^{34}S, or the measurement of ^{34}S and ^{32}S concentrations compared to a standard, were found to be around 40‰ during the Boring Billion. A δ^{34}S value higher than 45‰ would be evidence of a fully oxygenated ocean, while a δ^{34}S value lower than 5‰ would imply an anoxic atmosphere.

In the paper, Canfield also used a box model to explain how intermediate oceans, or oceans that are only partially oxidized, would have formed. The model shows that, assuming nutrient levels were anywhere near present-day levels, atmospheric oxygen levels would have needed to be much higher at the end of the GOE in order to fully oxygenate the ocean.

== Scientific dispute ==
There is some dispute about the stability of large-scale euxinia. Euxinic conditions would result in the depletion of metals essential for life, like molybdenum and copper. This would prevent the high rates of primary production that are required for euxinic oceans to form in the first place. Indeed, evidence from shale records found that molybdenum concentrations in the ocean were less than 1/5th of today's ocean.

== See also ==
- Anoxic event – Historic oxygen depletion events in Earth's oceans
- Hypoxia – Low oxygen conditions or levels
- Boring Billion – Earth history, 1.8 to 0.8 billion years ago
- Mass extinction – Rapid decrease in Earth's biodiversity
- Ocean stratification – Layering of ocean water due to density differences
- Permian–Triassic extinction event – Earth's most severe extinction event
- Suess effect – Atmospheric chemical signature of fossil fuel burning
