= Purple sulfur bacteria =

Group of bacteria

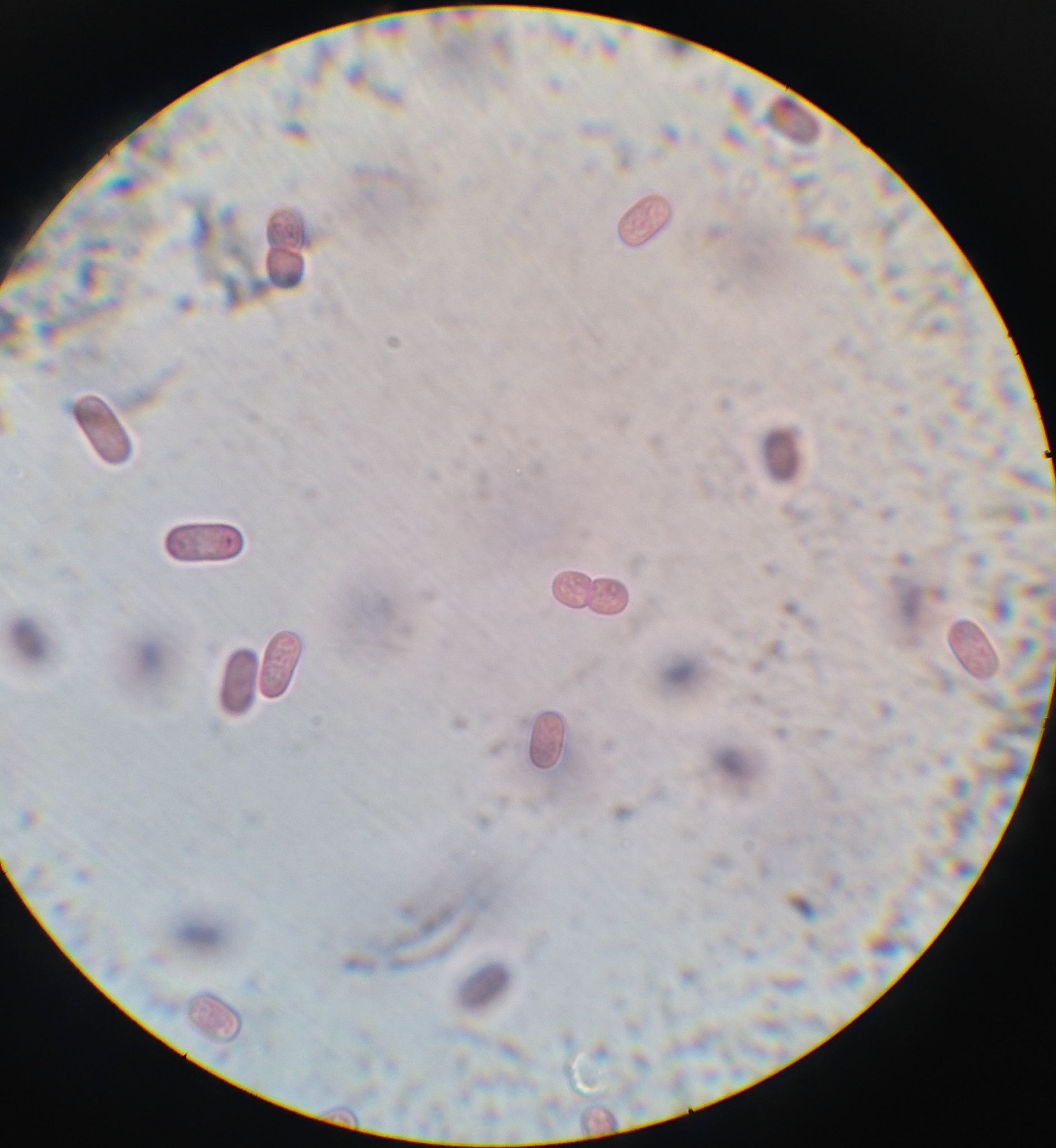
Chromatium okenii in the microscope at 600x magnification

The purple sulfur bacteria (PSB) are part of a group of Pseudomonadota capable of photosynthesis, collectively referred to as purple bacteria. They are anaerobic or microaerophilic, and are often found in stratified water environments including hot springs, stagnant water bodies, as well as microbial mats in intertidal zones. Unlike plants, algae, and cyanobacteria, purple sulfur bacteria do not use water as their reducing agent, and therefore do not produce oxygen. Instead, they can use sulfur in the form of sulfide or thiosulfate as the electron donor in their photosynthetic pathways. Some species can use H_{2}, Fe^{2+}, or NO_{2}^{−} as well. The sulfur is oxidized to produce granules of elemental sulfur. This, in turn, may be oxidized to form sulfuric acid.

The purple sulfur bacteria are largely divided into two families, the Chromatiaceae and the Ectothiorhodospiraceae, which produce internal and external sulfur granules respectively, and show differences in the structure of their internal membranes. They make up part of the order Chromatiales, included in the Gammaproteobacteria. The genus Halothiobacillus is also included in the Chromatiales, in its own family, but it is not photosynthetic.

== Characteristics of purple sulfur bacteria ==
Major photosynthetic pigments: Bacteriochlorophylls a or b

Location of photosynthetic pigments: Plasma membrane and chromatophore (lamellar membrane complexes that are continuous with the plasma membrane)

Photosynthetic electron donors: H_{2}, H_{2}S, S

Sulfur deposition: Inside the cell

Metabolic type: Photolithoautotroph

== Ecology ==
=== Habitat ===
Purple sulfur bacteria are generally found in illuminated anoxic zones of lakes and other aquatic habitats where hydrogen sulfide accumulates and also in "sulfur springs" where geochemically or biologically produced hydrogen sulfide can trigger the formation of blooms of purple sulfur bacteria. Anoxic conditions are required for photosynthesis; these bacteria cannot thrive in oxygenated environments.

The most favorable lakes for the development of purple sulfur bacteria are meromictic (permanently stratified) lakes. Meromictic lakes stratify because they have denser (usually saline) water in the bottom and less dense (usually fresh water) nearer the surface. Growth of purple sulfur bacteria is also supported by the layering in holomictic lakes. These lakes are thermally stratified; in the spring and summer time, water at the surface is warmed, making it less dense than underlying colder water, which provides sufficiently stable stratification for purple sulfur bacteria growth. If sufficient sulfate is present to support sulfate reduction, the sulfide, produced in the sediments, diffuses upward into the anoxic bottom waters, where purple sulfur bacteria can form dense cell masses, called blooms, usually in association with green phototrophic bacteria.

Purple sulfur bacteria can also be found and are a prominent component in intertidal microbial mats. Mats, such as the Sippewissett Microbial Mat, have dynamic environments due to the flow of tides and incoming fresh water leading to similarly stratified environments as meromictic lakes. Purple sulfur bacteria growth is enabled as sulfur is supplied from the death and decomposition of microorganisms located above them within these intertidal pools. The stratification and sulfur source allows the PSB to grow in these intertidal pools where the mats occur. The PSB can help stabilize these microbial mat environment sediments through the secretion of extracellular polymeric substances that can bind the sediments in the pools.

=== Ecological significance ===
Purple sulfur bacteria are able to affect their environment by contributing to nutrient cycling, and by using their metabolism to alter their surroundings. They are able to play a significant role in primary production suggesting that these organisms affect the carbon cycle through carbon fixation. Purple sulfur bacteria also contribute to the phosphorus cycle in their habitat, and the iron cycle. Through upwelling of these organisms, phosphorus, a limiting nutrient in the oxic layer of lakes, is recycled and provided to heterotrophic bacteria for use. This indicates that although purple sulfur bacteria are found in the anoxic layer of their habitat, they are able to promote the growth of many heterotrophic organisms by supplying inorganic nutrients to the above oxic layer. Another form of recycling of inorganic nutrients and dissolved organic matter by purple sulfur bacteria is through the food chain; they act as a source of food to other organisms.

Some purple sulfur bacteria have evolved to optimize their environmental conditions for their own growth. For example, in the South Andros Black Hole in the Bahamas, purple sulfur bacteria adopted a new characteristic in which they are able to use their metabolism to radiate heat energy into their surroundings. Due to the inefficiency of their carotenoids, or light-harvesting centres, the organisms are able to release excess light energy as heat energy. This adaptation allows them to compete more effectively within their environment. By raising the temperature of the surrounding water, they create an ecological niche which supports their own growth, while also allowing them to outcompete other non-thermotolerant organisms.

== Growth in meromictic lakes ==
Meromictic lakes are permanently stratified lakes produced by a gradient of saline concentrations. The highly salinated bottom layer is separated from the top layer of fresh water by the chemocline, where the salinity changes drastically. Due to the large difference in density, the upper and lower layers do not mix, resulting in an anoxic environment below the chemocline. This anoxic environment with light and sufficient sulfide availability is ideal for purple sulfur bacteria.

A study done at the Mahoney Lake suggested that purple sulfur bacteria contributes to the recycling of the inorganic nutrient, phosphorus. The upwelling of purple sulfur bacteria into the top layer of water creates a source of bound phosphorus, and phosphatase activity releases this phosphorus into the water. The soluble phosphorus is then incorporated into heterotrophic bacteria for use in developmental processes. In this way, purple sulfur bacteria participates in the phosphorus cycle and minimizes nutrient loss.

A study done in Switzerland indicated from the purple sulfur bacteria organism located in Lake Cadagno the strain Cad16^{T} had the highest CO_{2} assimilation rate.

== Biomarkers ==
Purple sulfur bacteria make conjugated pigments called carotenoids that function in the light harvesting complex. When these organisms die and sink, some pigment molecules are preserved in modified form in the sediments. One carotenoid molecule produced, okenone, is diagenetically altered to the biomarker okenane. The discovery of okenane in marine sediments implies the presence of purple sulfur bacteria during the time of burial. Okenane has been identified in one sedimentary outcrop from Northern Australia dating to 1.64 billion years ago. The authors of the study concluded that, based on the presence of purple sulfur bacteria's biomarker, the Paleoproterozoic ocean must have been anoxic and sulfidic at depth. This finding provides evidence for the Canfield Ocean hypothesis.

== Bioremediation ==
Purple sulfur bacteria can contribute to a reduction of environmentally harmful organic compounds and odour emission in manure wastewater lagoons where they are known to grow. Harmful compounds such as methane, a greenhouse gas, and hydrogen sulfide, a pungent, toxic compound, can be found in wastewater lagoons. PSB can help lower the concentration of both, and others.

Harmful organic compounds can be removed through photoassimilation, the uptake of carbon by organisms through photosynthesis. When PSB in the lagoons perform photosynthesis they can utilize the carbon from harmful compounds, such as methane, as their carbon source. This removes methane, a greenhouse gas, from the lagoon and reduces the lagoons' atmospheric pollution affect.

H_{2}S can act as a sulfur source for PSB during these same photosynthetic processes that remove the organic compounds. The use of H_{2}S as a reducing agent by PSB removes it from the lagoon and leads to a reduction of odour and toxicity in the lagoons.

== See also ==
- Anoxic event
- Anoxygenic photosynthesis
- Green Lake (New York)
- Green sulfur bacteria
- Okenane
- Sulfur-reducing bacteria
