= Donald Canfield =

American geologist

- Born: Donald Eugene Canfield; November 14, 1957 (age 68)
- Education: Miami University (BS); Yale University (PhD)
- Known for: Canfield ocean
- Spouse: Marianne prip Olsen
- Awards: Member of the National Academy of Sciences (2007), knight of the Order of the Dannebrog (2021)
- Scientific career
- Fields: Geobiology; Oceanography; Biogeochemistry
- Workplaces: Ames Research Center; Aarhus University; University of Michigan; Max Planck Institute for Marine Microbiology; Georgia Institute of Technology; University of Southern Denmark
- Thesis: Sulfate reduction and the diagenesis of iron in anoxic marine sediments (1988)
- Doctoral advisor: Robert Berner
- Website: www.sdu.dk/staff/dec

Donald Eugene Canfield (born 1957) is an American geochemist and Professor of Ecology at the University of Southern Denmark known for his work on the evolution of Earth's atmosphere and oceans. The Canfield ocean, a sulfidic partially oxic ocean existing during the middle of the Proterozoic eon, is named after him.

== Education ==
Canfield was educated at Miami University and Yale University where he was awarded a PhD for research on diagenesis in marine sediments supervised by Robert Berner in 1988.

== Career and research ==
Canfield has been the director of the Nordic Center for Earth Evolution (NordCEE) since August 2006, and works at the University of Southern Denmark. His research investigates the geobiology of ocean chemistry. Prior to his current position he has worked at the Ames Research Center, Aarhus University, the University of Michigan, the Max Planck Institute for Marine Microbiology in Germany and the Georgia Institute of Technology. Author of more than 350 articles. Cited nearly 55,000 times. He is Author of Oxygen: A Four Billion Year History (2014) Princeton University Press.

== Awards and honors ==
Canfield was elected a member of the National Academy of Sciences in 2007. He was awarded the European Geosciences Union's Vladimir Ivanovich Vernadsky Medal in 2010. In 2021, he was knighted by Queen Margrethe II into the Order of the Dannebrog. Canfield is a member of the Royal Society of London, Royal Danish Academy of Sciences and Letters, Royal Swedish Academy of Sciences, American Geophysical Union, Society for Microbiology, Geochemical society, and American Academy for the Advancement of Science (AAAS). Canfield is Chair, Danish Institute of Advanced Study (DIAS). He is the Villum Investigator, 2023.
