= Allochromatium renukae =

Scientific classification
- Domain: Bacteria
- Kingdom: Pseudomonadati
- Phylum: Pseudomonadota
- Class: Gammaproteobacteria
- Order: Chromatiales
- Family: Chromatiaceae
- Genus: Allochromatium
- Species: A. renukae

Binomial name
- Allochromatium renukae Anil Kumar et al. 2008

Type strain
- DSM 18713, JCM 14262, strain JA136

Synonyms
- Allochromatium renukaii

Genus of bacteria

Allochromatium renukae is a Gram-negative and phototrophic bacterium from the genus of Allochromatium which has been isolated from brackish water from Chollangi in India.
