= Sedimenticola selenatireducens =

Scientific classification
- Domain: Bacteria
- Kingdom: Pseudomonadati
- Phylum: Pseudomonadota
- Class: Gammaproteobacteria
- Order: Chromatiales
- Family: Sedimenticolaceae
- Genus: Sedimenticola
- Species: S. selenatireducens

Binomial name
- Sedimenticola selenatireducens Narasingarao and Häggblom 2006

Type strain
- AK4OH1, ATCC BAA-1233, DSM 17993

Species of bacterium

Sedimenticola selenatireducens is a gram-negative bacterium from the genus of Sedimenticola which has been isolated from estuarine sediments from the Arthur Kill in the United States.
