= Pararheinheimera mesophila =

Scientific classification
- Domain: Bacteria
- Kingdom: Pseudomonadati
- Phylum: Pseudomonadota
- Class: Gammaproteobacteria
- Order: Chromatiales
- Family: Chromatiaceae
- Genus: Pararheinheimera
- Species: P. mesophila

Binomial name
- Pararheinheimera mesophila (Kumar et al. 2015) Sisinthy et al. 2017

Type strain
- DSM 29723, MTCC 12064, strain IITR-13

Synonyms
- Rheinheimera mesophila

Genus of bacteria

Pararheinheimera mesophila is a Gram-negative bacterium from the genus of Pararheinheimera which has been isolated from sandy soil which was contaminated with pesticide from Eloor in India.
