= Thiorhodococcus mannitoliphagus =

Scientific classification
- Domain: Bacteria
- Kingdom: Pseudomonadati
- Phylum: Pseudomonadota
- Class: Gammaproteobacteria
- Order: Chromatiales
- Family: Chromatiaceae
- Genus: Thiorhodococcus
- Species: T. mannitoliphagus

Binomial name
- Thiorhodococcus mannitoliphagus Rabold et al. 2006

Type strain
- ATCC BAA-1228, VKM B-2393, strain WS

Synonyms
- Thiorhodococcus mannitophagus

Genus of bacteria

Thiorhodococcus mannitoliphagus is a bacterium from the genus of Thiorhodococcus which has been isolated from a microbial mat from the White Sea.
