= Thiohalocapsa marina =

Scientific classification
- Domain: Bacteria
- Kingdom: Pseudomonadati
- Phylum: Pseudomonadota
- Class: Gammaproteobacteria
- Order: Chromatiales
- Family: Chromatiaceae
- Genus: Thiohalocapsa
- Species: T. marina

Binomial name
- Thiohalocapsa marina Anil Kumar et al. 2009

Type strain
- DSM 19078, JCM 14780, strain JA142

Synonyms
- Thiohalocapsa jntuii

Genus of bacteria

Thiohalocapsa marina is a Gram-negative, spherical-shaped, phototrophic and non-motile bacterium from the genus of Thiohalocapsa which has been isolated from a marine aquaculture pond from Visakhapatnam in India.
