= Guyparkeria =

Scientific classification
- Domain: Bacteria
- Kingdom: Pseudomonadati
- Phylum: Pseudomonadota
- Class: Gammaproteobacteria
- Order: Chromatiales
- Family: Thioalkalibacteraceae
- Genus: Guyparkeria

Species
- Guyparkeria halophila Guyparkeria hydrothermalis

Genus of bacteria

Guyparkeria is a genus in the Gammaproteobacteria. Both species are obligate aerobic bacteria; they require oxygen to grow. They are also halophilic and have varying degrees of thermophilicity. They live in environments with high concentrations of salt or other solutes, such as in hydrothermal vent plumes or in hypersaline playas, and do require high sodium ion concentrations in order to grow, as is also the case in the other genus of the same family, Thioalkalibacter

Both species of this genus were originally published as members of the genus Thiobacillus, before they were reclassified in 2000 to Halothiobacillus, as Halothiobacillus halophilus and Halothiobacillus hydrothermalis, both of which reclassified on the grounds or morphological, genomic and physiological differences to the newly designated genus Guyparkeria in 2017, as Guyparkeria halophila and Guyparkeria hydrothermalis.
