= Allochromatium humboldtianum =

Scientific classification
- Domain: Bacteria
- Kingdom: Pseudomonadati
- Phylum: Pseudomonadota
- Class: Gammaproteobacteria
- Order: Chromatiales
- Family: Chromatiaceae
- Genus: Allochromatium
- Species: A. humboldtianum

Binomial name
- Allochromatium humboldtianum Serrano et al. 2015

Type strain
- DSM 21881, KCTC 15448, AX1YPE

Genus of bacteria

Allochromatium humboldtianum is a Gram-negative and motile bacterium from the genus of Allochromatium which has been isolated from shallow water and coastal sediments from the coast of Callao in Peru.
