= Rheinheimera coerulea =

Scientific classification
- Domain: Bacteria
- Kingdom: Pseudomonadati
- Phylum: Pseudomonadota
- Class: Gammaproteobacteria
- Order: Chromatiales
- Family: Chromatiaceae
- Genus: Rheinheimera
- Species: R. coerulea

Binomial name
- Rheinheimera coerulea Sheu et al. 2018

Type strain
- BCRC 81054, KCTC 52815, LMG 30056, strain TAPG2

Genus of bacteria

Rheinheimera coerulea is a Gram-negative, non-spore-forming, aerobic and motile bacterium from the genus of Rheinheimera which has been isolated from a freshwater creek in Taiwan.
