= Rheinheimera pacifica =

Scientific classification
- Domain: Bacteria
- Kingdom: Pseudomonadati
- Phylum: Pseudomonadota
- Class: Gammaproteobacteria
- Order: Chromatiales
- Family: Chromatiaceae
- Genus: Rheinheimera
- Species: R. pacifica

Binomial name
- Rheinheimera pacifica Romanenko et al. 2003

Type strain
- CCUG 46544, DSM 17616, IAM 15043, JCM 12090, KMM 1406, NBRC 103167, NRIC 0539

Synonyms
- Pacifibacter primarius

Genus of bacteria

Rheinheimera pacifica is a Gram-negative, rod-shaped, aerobic, halotolerant and motile bacterium from the genus of Rheinheimera which has been isolated from deep sea water from the Pacific.
