= Rheinheimera marina =

Scientific classification
- Domain: Bacteria
- Kingdom: Pseudomonadati
- Phylum: Pseudomonadota
- Class: Gammaproteobacteria
- Order: Chromatiales
- Family: Chromatiaceae
- Genus: Rheinheimera
- Species: R. marina

Binomial name
- Rheinheimera marina Wang et al. 2018

Type strain
- CGMCC 1.15399, KACC 18560, strain TP462

Species of bacterium

Rheinheimera marina is a Gram-negative, rod-shaped, aerobic and motile bacterium from the genus of Rheinheimera which has been isolated from a seamount in the near of Yap Trench from the western Pacific.
