= Thiorhodococcus kakinadensis =

Scientific classification
- Domain: Bacteria
- Kingdom: Pseudomonadati
- Phylum: Pseudomonadota
- Class: Gammaproteobacteria
- Order: Chromatiales
- Family: Chromatiaceae
- Genus: Thiorhodococcus
- Species: T. kakinadensis

Binomial name
- Thiorhodococcus kakinadensis Anil Kumar et al. 2007

Type strain
- ATCC BAA-1353, DSM 18858, JCM 14150, strain JA130

Synonyms
- Thiorhodococcus kakinadaii

Genus of bacteria

Thiorhodococcus kakinadensis is a Gram-negative and motile bacterium from the genus of Thiorhodococcus.
