= Thiorhodococcus alkaliphilus =

Scientific classification
- Domain: Bacteria
- Kingdom: Pseudomonadati
- Phylum: Pseudomonadota
- Class: Gammaproteobacteria
- Order: Chromatiales
- Family: Chromatiaceae
- Genus: Thiorhodococcus
- Species: T. alkaliphilus

Binomial name
- Thiorhodococcus alkaliphilus Prathyash et al. 2017

Type strain
- JCM 31245, KCTC 15531, strain JA878

Genus of bacteria

Thiorhodococcus alkaliphilus is a Gram-negative and phototrophic bacterium from the genus of Thiorhodococcus which has been isolated from sediments from a pond near the Nari Salt Pan in India.
