= Rheinheimera gaetbuli =

Scientific classification
- Domain: Bacteria
- Kingdom: Pseudomonadati
- Phylum: Pseudomonadota
- Class: Gammaproteobacteria
- Order: Chromatiales
- Family: Chromatiaceae
- Genus: Rheinheimera
- Species: R. gaetbuli

Binomial name
- Rheinheimera gaetbuli Baek and Jeon 2017

Type strain
- JCM 30403, KACC 18254, strain H26

Genus of bacteria

Rheinheimera gaetbuli is a Gram-negative, rod-shaped, strictly aerobic and motile bacterium from the genus of Rheinheimera which has been isolated from tidal flat sediments from the Jeju Island in Korea.
