= Thiorhodococcus fuscus =

Scientific classification
- Domain: Bacteria
- Kingdom: Pseudomonadati
- Phylum: Pseudomonadota
- Class: Gammaproteobacteria
- Order: Chromatiales
- Family: Chromatiaceae
- Genus: Thiorhodococcus
- Species: T. fuscus

Binomial name
- Thiorhodococcus fuscus Lakshmi et al. 2015

Type strain
- KCTC 5701, NBRC 104959, strain JA363

Synonyms
- Thiorhodococcus satpadensis

Genus of bacteria

Thiorhodococcus fuscus is a Gram-negative, moderately halophilic and photoautotrophic bacterium from the genus of Thiorhodococcus which has been isolated from sediments from the Chilika lagoon in India.
