= Imhoffiella bheemlica =

Scientific classification
- Domain: Bacteria
- Kingdom: Pseudomonadati
- Phylum: Pseudomonadota
- Class: Gammaproteobacteria
- Order: Chromatiales
- Family: Chromatiaceae
- Genus: Imhoffiella
- Species: I. bheemlica

Binomial name
- Imhoffiella bheemlica (Anil Kumar et al. 2007) Nupur et al. 2017

Type strain
- ATCC BAA-1362, DSM 18805, JCM 14149, MTCC 8120, strain JA132

Synonyms
- Thiorhodococcus bheemlicum, Thiorhodococcus bheemlicus

Genus of bacteria

Imhoffiella bheemlica is a bacterium from the genus of Imhoffiella which has been isolated from anoxic sediments from Bheemli in India.
