= Thiorhodococcus modestalkaliphilus =

Scientific classification
- Domain: Bacteria
- Kingdom: Pseudomonadati
- Phylum: Pseudomonadota
- Class: Gammaproteobacteria
- Order: Chromatiales
- Family: Chromatiaceae
- Genus: Thiorhodococcus
- Species: T. modestalkaliphilus

Binomial name
- Thiorhodococcus modestalkaliphilus Sucharita et al. 2010

Type strain
- KCTC 5710, NBRC 104958, strain JA395

Genus of bacteria

Thiorhodococcus modestalkaliphilus is a Gram-negative, phototrophic and motile bacterium from the genus of Thiorhodococcus which has been isolated from sediments from the Chilika Lagoon in India.
