= Halochromatium roseum =

Scientific classification
- Domain: Bacteria
- Kingdom: Pseudomonadati
- Phylum: Pseudomonadota
- Class: Gammaproteobacteria
- Order: Chromatiales
- Family: Chromatiaceae
- Genus: Halochromatium
- Species: H. roseum

Binomial name
- Halochromatium roseum Anil Kumar et al. 2007

Type strain
- ATCC BAA-1363, DSM 18859, JCM 14151, strain JA134

Synonyms
- Halochromatium rosei Lamprobacter pseudofilamentous

Genus of bacteria

Halochromatium roseum is a Gram-negative, rod-shaped, phototrophic and non-motile bacterium from the genus of Halochromatium which has been isolated from a marine solar saltern from Kakinada in India.
