= Rheinheimera nanhaiensis =

Scientific classification
- Domain: Bacteria
- Kingdom: Pseudomonadati
- Phylum: Pseudomonadota
- Class: Gammaproteobacteria
- Order: Chromatiales
- Family: Chromatiaceae
- Genus: Rheinheimera
- Species: R. nanhaiensis

Binomial name
- Rheinheimera nanhaiensis Li et al. 2011

Type strain
- CCTCC AB 209089, KACC 14030, strain E407-8

Genus of bacteria

Rheinheimera nanhaiensis is a Gram-negative, rod-shaped, and facultatively aerobic bacterium from the genus of Rheinheimera which has been isolated from sediments from the South China Sea.
