= Thiorhodococcus minor =

Scientific classification
- Domain: Bacteria
- Kingdom: Pseudomonadati
- Phylum: Pseudomonadota
- Class: Gammaproteobacteria
- Order: Chromatiales
- Family: Chromatiaceae
- Genus: Thiorhodococcus
- Species: T. minor

Binomial name
- Thiorhodococcus minor Guyoneaud et al. 1998

Type strain
- ATCC 700259, DSM 11518, strain CE2203

Synonyms
- Thiorhodococcus minus

Genus of bacteria

Thiorhodococcus minor is a bacterium from the genus of Thiorhodococcus which has been isolated from lagoon sediments from the Arcachon Bay.
