= Allochromatium phaeobacterium =

Scientific classification
- Domain: Bacteria
- Kingdom: Pseudomonadati
- Phylum: Pseudomonadota
- Class: Gammaproteobacteria
- Order: Chromatiales
- Family: Chromatiaceae
- Genus: Allochromatium
- Species: A. phaeobacterium

Binomial name
- Allochromatium phaeobacterium Srinivas et al. 2009

Type strain
- DSM 19781, JCM 14796, strain JA144

Synonyms
- Allochromatium sequicentenarium Allochromatium sesquicentenarium

Genus of bacteria

Allochromatium phaeobacterium (A. phaeobacterium) is a phototrophic and rod-shaped purple sulfur bacterium from the genus of Allochromatium which has been isolated from brackish water in Bheemli, Visakhapatnam, India.

A. phaeobacterium was first isolated from anoxic sediment in 2007, and isolated on a modified Bielbl and Pfennig medium.

== Description ==
A. phaeobacterium is a rod-shaped, gram-negative species of bacteria. This species appears brown in color, and is 1.0–1.5x2.0–4.0 $\mu m$in length. A. phaeobacterium is motile and reproduces through binary fission. It has been observed growing photoautotrophically, photolithoautotrophically, photolithotrophically, and photoorganoheterotrophically.

Absorption spectra has confirmed photoreceptors bacteriochlorophyll α, rhodopinals, and carotenoids.

== Genome ==
A. phaeobacterium has been partially sequenced through 16s rRNA gene sequencing with a sequence of approximately 1400 base pairs. The G/C content is 59.8%. Based on phylogenetic analysis from this 16s sequence, Allochromatium phaeobacterium is considered morphologically and physiologically distinct from others in the Allochromatium genus.
