= Pararheinheimera texasensis =

Scientific classification
- Domain: Bacteria
- Kingdom: Pseudomonadati
- Phylum: Pseudomonadota
- Class: Gammaproteobacteria
- Order: Chromatiales
- Family: Chromatiaceae
- Genus: Pararheinheimera
- Species: P. texasensis

Binomial name
- Pararheinheimera texasensis (Merchant et al. 2007) Sisinthy et al. 2017

Type strain
- ATCC BAA-1235, DSM 17496, strain A62-14B

Synonyms
- Rheinheimera texana, Rheinheimera texasensis

Genus of bacteria

Pararheinheimera texasensis is a Gram-negative, rod-shaped, non-spore-forming and motile bacterium from the genus of Pararheinheimera which has been isolated from the Spring Lake from San Marcos in the United States.
