= Rheinheimera baltica =

Scientific classification
- Domain: Bacteria
- Kingdom: Pseudomonadati
- Phylum: Pseudomonadota
- Class: Gammaproteobacteria
- Order: Chromatiales
- Family: Chromatiaceae
- Genus: Rheinheimera
- Species: R. baltica

Binomial name
- Rheinheimera baltica Brettar et al. 2002

Type strain
- DSM 14885, LMG 21511, strain OSBAC1

Synonyms
- Curacaobacter baltica

Genus of bacteria

Rheinheimera baltica is a bacterium from the genus of Rheinheimera which has been isolated from water from the Baltic Sea.
