= Rheinheimera aquimaris =

Scientific classification
- Domain: Bacteria
- Kingdom: Pseudomonadati
- Phylum: Pseudomonadota
- Class: Gammaproteobacteria
- Order: Chromatiales
- Family: Chromatiaceae
- Genus: Rheinheimera
- Species: R. aquimaris

Binomial name
- Rheinheimera aquimaris Yoon et al. 2007

Type strain
- JCM 14331, KCTC 12840, strain SW-353

Genus of bacteria

Rheinheimera aquimaris is a Gram-negative, non-spore-forming and motile bacterium from the genus of Rheinheimera which has been isolated from seawater from the Sea of Japan at Hwajinpo in Korea.
