= Rheinheimera perlucida =

Scientific classification
- Domain: Bacteria
- Kingdom: Pseudomonadati
- Phylum: Pseudomonadota
- Class: Gammaproteobacteria
- Order: Chromatiales
- Family: Chromatiaceae
- Genus: Rheinheimera
- Species: R. perlucida

Binomial name
- Rheinheimera perlucida Brettar et al. 2006

Type strain
- CIP 109200, DSM 18276, LMG 23581, strain BA131

Synonyms
- Alishewanella baltica

Genus of bacteria

Rheinheimera perlucida is a Gram-negative, rod-shaped and motile bacterium from the genus of Rheinheimera which has been isolated from water from the Baltic Sea.
