= Pararheinheimera aquatica =

Scientific classification
- Domain: Bacteria
- Kingdom: Pseudomonadati
- Phylum: Pseudomonadota
- Class: Gammaproteobacteria
- Order: Chromatiales
- Family: Chromatiaceae
- Genus: Pararheinheimera
- Species: P. aquatica

Binomial name
- Pararheinheimera aquatica (Chen et al. 2011) Sisinthy et al. 2017

Type strain
- BCRC 80081, LMG 25379, strain GR5

Synonyms
- Rheinheimera aquatica

Genus of bacteria

Pararheinheimera aquatica is a Gram-negative, aerobic, rod-shaped and motile bacterium from the genus of Pararheinheimera which has been isolated from a freshwater culture pond in Taiwan.
