= Pararheinheimera arenilitoris =

Scientific classification
- Domain: Bacteria
- Kingdom: Pseudomonadati
- Phylum: Pseudomonadota
- Class: Gammaproteobacteria
- Order: Chromatiales
- Family: Chromatiaceae
- Genus: Pararheinheimera
- Species: P. arenilitoris

Binomial name
- Pararheinheimera arenilitoris (Park et al. 2014) Sisinthy et al. 2017

Type strain
- CECT 8623, CTC 42112, strain J-MS1

Synonyms
- Rheinheimera arenilitoris

Genus of bacteria

Pararheinheimera arenilitoris is a Gram-negative, aerobic and rod-shaped bacterium from the genus of Pararheinheimera which has been isolated from seashore sand from the South Sea in Korea.
