= Rheinheimera japonica =

Scientific classification
- Domain: Bacteria
- Kingdom: Pseudomonadati
- Phylum: Pseudomonadota
- Class: Gammaproteobacteria
- Order: Chromatiales
- Family: Chromatiaceae
- Genus: Rheinheimera
- Species: R. japonica

Binomial name
- Rheinheimera japonica Romanenko et al. 2015

Type strain
- NRIC 0918, KMM 9512, KMM 9513

Genus of bacteria

Rheinheimera japonica is a Gram-negative, rod-shaped, aerobic and motile bacterium from the genus of Rheinheimera which has been isolated from seashore sediments from the Sea of Japan in Russia. Rheinheimera japonica has an antimicrobial activity.
