= Rheinheimera hassiensis =

Scientific classification
- Domain: Bacteria
- Kingdom: Pseudomonadati
- Phylum: Pseudomonadota
- Class: Gammaproteobacteria
- Order: Chromatiales
- Family: Chromatiaceae
- Genus: Rheinheimera
- Species: R. hassiensis

Binomial name
- Rheinheimera hassiensis Suarez et al. 2014

Type strain
- KACC 17070, LMG 27268, strain E48

Genus of bacteria

Rheinheimera hassiensis is a Gram-negative, rod-shaped and aerobic bacterium from the genus of Rheinheimera which has been isolated from the rhizosphere of the plant Hordeum secalinum from a salt meadow near Münzenberg in Germany.
