= Imhoffiella purpurea =

Scientific classification
- Domain: Bacteria
- Kingdom: Pseudomonadati
- Phylum: Pseudomonadota
- Class: Gammaproteobacteria
- Order: Chromatiales
- Family: Chromatiaceae
- Genus: Imhoffiella
- Species: I. purpurea

Binomial name
- Imhoffiella purpurea Nupur et al. 2017

Type strain
- JCM 18851, KCTC 15575, MTCC 12304, strain AK35

Genus of bacteria

Imhoffiella purpurea is a Gram-negative, phototrophic and motile bacterium from the genus of Imhoffiella which has been isolated from coastal water from Visakhapatnam in India.
