= Thiorhodovibrio winogradskyi =

Scientific classification
- Domain: Bacteria
- Kingdom: Pseudomonadati
- Phylum: Pseudomonadota
- Class: Gammaproteobacteria
- Order: Chromatiales
- Family: Chromatiaceae
- Genus: Thiorhodovibrio
- Species: T. winogradskyi

Binomial name
- Thiorhodovibrio winogradskyi Overmann et al. 1993

Species of bacterium

Thiorhodovibrio winogradskyi is a purple sulfur bacteria, the type species of its genus. Its cells are vibrioid-to spirilloid-shaped and motile by means of single polar flagella. It is moderately halophilic, with type strain SSP1 (=DSM 6702).
