= Rheinheimera aestuari =

Scientific classification
- Domain: Bacteria
- Kingdom: Pseudomonadati
- Phylum: Pseudomonadota
- Class: Gammaproteobacteria
- Order: Chromatiales
- Family: Chromatiaceae
- Genus: Rheinheimera
- Species: R. aestuari

Binomial name
- Rheinheimera aestuari Baek and Jeon 2015

Genus of bacteria

Rheinheimera aestuari is a Gram-negative, non-spore-forming, strictly aerobic and motile bacterium from the genus of Rheinheimera which has been isolated from coastal sediments from the Jeju Island in Korea.
