= Pararheinheimera tangshanensis =

Scientific classification
- Domain: Bacteria
- Kingdom: Pseudomonadati
- Phylum: Pseudomonadota
- Class: Gammaproteobacteria
- Order: Chromatiales
- Family: Chromatiaceae
- Genus: Pararheinheimera
- Species: P. tangshanensis

Binomial name
- Pararheinheimera tangshanensis (Zhang et al. 2008) Sisinthy et al. 2017

Type strain
- CGMCC 1.6362, DSM 19460, J3-A52, JA3-B52

Synonyms
- Rheinheimera tangshanensis

Genus of bacteria

Pararheinheimera tangshanensis is a Gram-negative, aerobic, rod-shaped and motile bacterium from the genus of Pararheinheimera which has been isolated from the roots of a rice plants (Oryza sativa) from Luannan County in China.
