= Pararheinheimera soli =

Scientific classification
- Domain: Bacteria
- Kingdom: Pseudomonadati
- Phylum: Pseudomonadota
- Class: Gammaproteobacteria
- Order: Chromatiales
- Family: Chromatiaceae
- Genus: Pararheinheimera
- Species: P. soli

Binomial name
- Pararheinheimera soli (Ryu et al. 2008) Sisinthy et al. 2017

Type strain
- DSM 19413, KCTC 22077, strain BD-d46

Synonyms
- Rheinheimera soli

Genus of bacteria

Pararheinheimera soli is a Gram-negative and non-spore-forming bacterium from the genus of Pararheinheimera which has been isolated from playground soil from Jinju in Korea.
