= Thiophaeococcus fuscus =

Scientific classification
- Domain: Bacteria
- Kingdom: Pseudomonadati
- Phylum: Pseudomonadota
- Class: Gammaproteobacteria
- Order: Chromatiales
- Family: Chromatiaceae
- Genus: Thiophaeococcus
- Species: T. fuscus

Binomial name
- Thiophaeococcus fuscus Divyasree et al. 2014

Type strain
- KCTC 15337, NBRC 109958, strain JA633

Genus of bacteria

Thiophaeococcus fuscus is a Gram-negative and motile bacterium from the genus of Thiophaeococcus has been isolated from black sand from a lagoon.
