= Thiodictyon =

Scientific classification
- Domain: Bacteria
- Kingdom: Pseudomonadati
- Phylum: Pseudomonadota
- Class: Gammaproteobacteria
- Order: Chromatiales
- Family: Chromatiaceae
- Genus: Thiodictyon; Sergei Winogradsky 1888

Species
- Thiodictyon elegans Sergei Winogradsky 1888; Thiodictyon bacillosum (Winogradsky 1888) Pfennig and Truper 1971; "Ca. T. syntrophicum" Luedin et al 2018; "Ca. T. intracellulare" Muñoz-Gómez et al 2021

Genus of bacteria

Thiodictyon is a genus of gram-negative bacterium classified within purple sulfur bacteria (PSB).

- T. elegans forms "netlike aggregates under certain culture conditions." It is obligately phototrophic and strictly anaerobic.
- T. bacillosum does not form netlike aggregates, only clumps.
- "Ca. T. syntrophicum" grows best under micro-oxic and low light conditions. There has only been one successful enrichment of "Ca. T. syntrophicum"; "Ca. T. syntrophicum" strain Cad16^{T}.
- "Ca. T. intracellulare" is reported in 2021 as a symbiont of Pseudoblepharisma tenue. It has lost a great portion of its genome, including known genes for sulfur dissimilation, but the remaining sequence place it quite close to "Ca. T. syntrophicum".

== Classification ==
Thiodictyon belongs to the family Chromatiaceae and class Gammaproteobacteria. "Ca. T. syntrophicum" is known to be related to the genera Lamprocystis, Thiocystis and Thiocapsa. Strain Cad16^{T} was previously assigned to the genus Lamprocystis, but was recently reassigned to the genus Thiodictyon by Peduzzi et al. Matrix-assisted laser desorption/ionization time of flight mass spectrometry (MALDI-TOF MS) was used to separate Cad16^{T} from Lamprocystis due to differences in cell morphology/arrangement, caretenoid groups and chemolithotrophic growth; all of which are important factors used to consider Cad16^{T} a member of the genus Thiodictyon rather than the genus Lamprocystis.

== Genetics ==
The 16S rRNA from the type strains of the two recognized species have been sequenced. The two proposed Candidatus species have had their whole genomes sequenced. GTDB reports that several whole genomes from metagenomic samples, not yet named, are also available, clustering into three additional species-level groups.

== Strain Cad16^{T} ==
Cad16^{T} is a novel strain of "Ca. T. syntrophicum", which was isolated from the chemocline of a crenogenic meromictic lake. 16S rRNA gene sequence data shows that Cad16^{T} is closely related to Thiodictyon bacillosum DSM234^{T} (99.2% sequence similarity) and Thiodictyon elegans DSM232^{T} (98.9% sequence similarity).

=== Environment ===
The Cad16^{T} strain of "Ca. T. syntrophicum" was isolated from Lake Cadagno. This lake is crenogenic and meromictic, and its layers create diverse ecological niches which support the growth of diverse and often novel species. Lake Cadagno is euxinic, meaning it is both anoxic and sulphidic at depth. Its chemocline, which occurs at approximately 12 m, is quite narrow and has high concentrations of sulfide, sulfate, oxygen and light. A turbidity maximum also correlates with the chemocline, and this is caused by high concentrations of anaerobic phototrophic sulfur bacteria.

=== Carbon fixation ===
"Ca. T. syntrophicum" strain Cad16^{T} has the capability for CO_{2} fixation, and was found to play a key role in the overall inorganic carbon fixation that occurred in Lake Cadagno. Within the chemocline of Lake Cadagno, Cad16^{T} and another isolate from the lake, CadA31 (a PSB), were the two most efficient CO_{2} fixing strains, and researchers found that CO_{2} fixation occurred in both light and dark conditions. However, Cad16^{T} was most likely the main contributor to light and dark carbon fixation within the chemocline of the lake, as Storelli et al. found that this strain assimilated approximately 25.9% of all hypothetical carbon fixed within the chemocline.

=== Sulfur cycling ===
Strain Cad16^{T} of "Ca. T. syntrophicum" is a species of PSB. Researchers discovered that strain Cad16^{T} creates and stores sulfur globules intracellularly. The pure cultures of Cad16^{T} were found to utilize sulfide and elemental sulfur as their electron donors.

Cad16^{T} is known to have syntrophic associations and cell-to-cell aggregation with Desulfocapsa sp. Desulfocapsa sp. is a sulfate reducing and sulfur disproportionating bacteria found in both mixed culture and within the natural environment.
