= Pararheinheimera chironomi =

Scientific classification
- Domain: Bacteria
- Kingdom: Pseudomonadati
- Phylum: Pseudomonadota
- Class: Gammaproteobacteria
- Order: Chromatiales
- Family: Chromatiaceae
- Genus: Pararheinheimera
- Species: P. chironomi

Binomial name
- Pararheinheimera chironomi (Halpern et al. 2007) Sisinthy et al. 2017

Type strain
- DSM 18694, LMG 23818, strain K19414

Synonyms
- Rheinheimera chironomi

Genus of bacteria

Pararheinheimera chironomi is a Gram-negative and aerobic bacterium from the genus of Pararheinheimera.
