= Rheinheimera salexigens =

Scientific classification
- Domain: Bacteria
- Kingdom: Pseudomonadati
- Phylum: Pseudomonadota
- Class: Gammaproteobacteria
- Order: Chromatiales
- Family: Chromatiaceae
- Genus: Rheinheimera
- Species: R. salexigens

Binomial name
- Rheinheimera salexigens Hayashi et al. 2018

Type strain
- ATCC BAA-2715, CIP 111115, strain KH87

Synonyms
- Rheinheimera makueensis

Genus of bacteria

Rheinheimera salexigens is a Gram-negative and rod-shaped bacterium from the genus of Rheinheimera which has been isolated from a fishing hook from Oahu.
