= Pararheinheimera tilapiae =

Scientific classification
- Domain: Bacteria
- Kingdom: Pseudomonadati
- Phylum: Pseudomonadota
- Class: Gammaproteobacteria
- Order: Chromatiales
- Family: Chromatiaceae
- Genus: Pararheinheimera
- Species: P. tilapiae

Binomial name
- Pararheinheimera tilapiae (Chen et al. 2013) Sisinthy et al. 2017

Type strain
- BCRC 80263, KCTC 23315, LMG 26339, strain Ruye-90

Synonyms
- Rheinheimera tilapiae

Genus of bacteria

Pararheinheimera tilapiae is a Gram-negative, rod-shaped, aerobic and motile bacterium from the genus of Pararheinheimera which has been isolated from a pond which was cultivated with Tilapiine cichlid fish from Taiwan.
