= Rheinheimera tuosuensis =

Scientific classification
- Domain: Bacteria
- Kingdom: Pseudomonadati
- Phylum: Pseudomonadota
- Class: Gammaproteobacteria
- Order: Chromatiales
- Family: Chromatiaceae
- Genus: Rheinheimera
- Species: R. tuosuensis

Binomial name
- Rheinheimera tuosuensis Zhong et al. 2014

Type strain
- CGMCC 1.12461, JCM 19264, strain TS-T4

Genus of bacteria

Rheinheimera tuosuensis is a Gram-negative and non-spore-forming bacterium from the genus of Rheinheimera which has been isolated from the Tuosu Lake from the Qaidam Basin in China.
