= Sedimenticola thiotaurini =

Scientific classification
- Domain: Bacteria
- Kingdom: Pseudomonadati
- Phylum: Pseudomonadota
- Class: Gammaproteobacteria
- Order: Chromatiales
- Family: Sedimenticolaceae
- Genus: Sedimenticola
- Species: S. thiotaurini

Binomial name
- Sedimenticola thiotaurini Flood et al. 2015

Type strain
- ATCC BAA-2640, DSM 28581, SIP-G1

Species of bacterium

Sedimenticola thiotaurini is a sulfur-oxidizing and facultative anaerobe bacterium from the genus of Sedimenticola which has been isolated from salt marsh sediments from the Sippewissett Salt Marsh in the United States.
