= Thiorhodococcus =

Scientific classification
- Domain: Bacteria
- Kingdom: Pseudomonadati
- Phylum: Pseudomonadota
- Class: Gammaproteobacteria
- Order: Chromatiales
- Family: Chromatiaceae
- Genus: Thiorhodococcus; Guyoneaud et al. 1998

Type species
- Thiorhodococcus minor

Species
- T. alkaliphilus T. fuscus T. kakinadensis T. mannitoliphagus T. minor T. modestalkaliphilus

Genus of bacteria

Thiorhodococcus is a Gram-negative genus of bacteria from the family of Chromatiaceae.
