= Marichromatium =

Scientific classification
- Domain: Bacteria
- Kingdom: Pseudomonadati
- Phylum: Pseudomonadota
- Class: Gammaproteobacteria
- Order: Chromatiales
- Family: Chromatiaceae
- Genus: Marichromatium; Imhoff et al. 1998

Type species
- M. gracile

Species
- See text.

Genus of bacteria

Marichromatium is a genus in the phylum Pseudomonadota (Bacteria). The name Marichromatium derives from: Latin mare, the sea; Neo-Latin Chromatium, a genus name; to give Marichromatium, the Chromatium of the sea, the truly marine Chromatium.

== Species ==
The genus contains five species (including basonyms and synonyms), namely:

- M. bheemlicum (Anil Kumar et al. 2007, New Latin bheemlicum, pertaining to Bheemli, the place from which the type strain was isolated)
- M. fluminis (Sucharita et al. 2010, Latin n fluminis, of a river, referring to the isolation of the type strain from sediment of the Baitarani River, located in Kalibanj Forest, Orissa, India)
- M. gracile (Strzeszewski 1913) Imhoff et al. 1998, (type species of the genus), Latin gracile, thin, slender)
- M. indicum (Arunasri et al. 2005, Latin indicum, Indian, pertaining to India, the country in which the type strain was isolated)
- M. purpuratum (Imhoff and Trüper 1980, Imhoff et al. 1998, Latin purpuratum, clad or dressed in purple)

== See also ==
- Bacterial taxonomy
- Microbiology
