= Thiorhodovibrio =

Scientific classification
- Domain: Bacteria
- Kingdom: Pseudomonadati
- Phylum: Pseudomonadota
- Class: Gammaproteobacteria
- Order: Chromatiales
- Family: Chromatiaceae
- Genus: Thiorhodovibrio; Overmann et al. 1993

Type species
- Thiorhodovibrio winogradskyi

Species
- T. winogradskyi T. sibirica

Genus of bacteria

Thiorhodovibrio is a Gram-negative genus of bacteria from the family of Chromatiaceae.
