= Imhoffiella =

Scientific classification
- Domain: Bacteria
- Kingdom: Pseudomonadati
- Phylum: Pseudomonadota
- Class: Gammaproteobacteria
- Order: Chromatiales
- Family: Chromatiaceae
- Genus: Imhoffiella; Nupur et al. 2017

Type species
- Imhoffiella purpurea

Species
- I. bheemlica I. purpurea

Genus of bacteria

Imhoffiella is a phototrophic genus of bacteria from the family of Chromatiaceae. Imhoffiella is named after the German microbiologist Johannes F. Imhoff.
