= Lamprobacter =

Scientific classification
- Domain: Bacteria
- Kingdom: Pseudomonadati
- Phylum: Pseudomonadota
- Class: Gammaproteobacteria
- Order: Chromatiales
- Family: Chromatiaceae
- Genus: Lamprobacter; Gorlenko et al. 1988

Type species
- Lamprobacter modestohalophilus

Species
- L. modestohalophilus

Genus of bacteria

Lamprobacter is a Gram-negative, rod-shaped and motile genus of bacteria from the family of Chromatiaceae with one known species (Lamprobacter modestohalophilus). The habitat of Lamprobacter bacteria is hydrogen sulfide-containing mud and saline water.
