= Sedimenticola =

Scientific classification
- Domain: Bacteria
- Kingdom: Pseudomonadati
- Phylum: Pseudomonadota
- Class: Gammaproteobacteria
- Order: Chromatiales
- Family: Sedimenticolaceae
- Genus: Sedimenticola; Narasingarao and Häggblom 2006

Type species
- Sedimenticola selenatireducens Narasingarao and Häggblom 2006

Species
- Sedimenticola selenatireducens Sedimenticola thiotaurini

Genus of bacteria

Sedimenticola is a genus of gram-negative bacteria from the class Gammaproteobacteria.
