= Halochromatium =

Scientific classification
- Domain: Bacteria
- Kingdom: Pseudomonadati
- Phylum: Pseudomonadota
- Class: Gammaproteobacteria
- Order: Chromatiales
- Family: Chromatiaceae
- Genus: Halochromatium; Imhoff et al. 1998

Type species
- Halochromatium salexigens

Species
- H. glycolicum H. roseum H. salexigens

Genus of bacteria

Halochromatium is a Gram-positive and motile genus of bacteria from the family of Chromatiaceae. Halochromatium bacteria occur in microbial mats from hypersaline habitates.
