= Phaeobacterium =

Scientific classification
- Domain: Bacteria
- Kingdom: Pseudomonadati
- Phylum: Pseudomonadota
- Class: Gammaproteobacteria
- Order: Chromatiales
- Family: Chromatiaceae
- Genus: Phaeobacterium; Nupur et al. 2015

Type species
- Phaeobacterium nitratireducens

Species
- P. nitratireducens

Genus of bacteria

Phaeobacterium is a Gram-negative, rod-shaped, phototrophic and motile genus of bacteria from the family of Chromatiaceae with one known species (Phaeobacterium nitratireducens).
