= Thioalkalicoccus =

Scientific classification
- Domain: Bacteria
- Kingdom: Pseudomonadati
- Phylum: Pseudomonadota
- Class: Gammaproteobacteria
- Order: Chromatiales
- Family: Chromatiaceae
- Genus: Thioalkalicoccus; Bryantseva et al. 2000

Type species
- Thioalkalicoccus limnaeus

Species
- T. limnaeus

Synonyms
- Thialkalicoccus

Genus of bacteria

Thioalkalicoccus is a Gram-negative, mesophilic and obligate alkaliphilic genus of bacteria from the family of Chromatiaceae with one known species (Thioalkalicoccus limnaeus). Thioalkalicoccus limnaeus occurs in brackish water lakes.
