= Thiobaca =

Scientific classification
- Domain: Bacteria
- Kingdom: Pseudomonadati
- Phylum: Pseudomonadota
- Class: Gammaproteobacteria
- Order: Chromatiales
- Family: Chromatiaceae
- Genus: Thiobaca; Rees et al. 2002

Type species
- Thiobaca trueperi

Species
- T. trueperi

Genus of bacteria

Thiobaca is a phototrophic and motile genus of bacteria from the family of Chromatiaceae with one known species (Thiobaca trueperi). Thiobaca trueperi has been isolated from sediments from a eutrophic lake.
