= Thiohalocapsa =

Scientific classification
- Domain: Bacteria
- Kingdom: Pseudomonadati
- Phylum: Pseudomonadota
- Class: Gammaproteobacteria
- Order: Chromatiales
- Family: Chromatiaceae
- Genus: Thiohalocapsa; Imhoff et al. 1998

Type species
- Thiohalocapsa halophila

Species
- T. halophila T. marina

Genus of bacteria

Thiohalocapsa is a Gram-negative and non-motile genus of bacteria from the family of Chromatiaceae.
