= Thiococcus =

Scientific classification
- Domain: Bacteria
- Kingdom: Pseudomonadati
- Phylum: Pseudomonadota
- Class: Gammaproteobacteria
- Order: Chromatiales
- Family: Chromatiaceae
- Genus: Thiococcus; Imhoff et al. 1998

Type species
- Thiococcus pfennigii

Species
- T. pfennigii

Genus of bacteria

Thiococcus is a Gram-negative, non‐motile, obligately phototrophic and strictly anaerobic genus of bacteria from the family of Chromatiaceae with one known species (Thiococcus pfennigii). Thiococcus pfennigii was first isolated from salt marshes.
