= Halochromatium glycolicum =

Scientific classification
- Domain: Bacteria
- Kingdom: Pseudomonadati
- Phylum: Pseudomonadota
- Class: Gammaproteobacteria
- Order: Chromatiales
- Family: Chromatiaceae
- Genus: Halochromatium
- Species: H. glycolicum

Binomial name
- Halochromatium glycolicum (Caumette et al. 1997) Imhoff et al. 1998

Type strain
- ATCC 700202, DSM 11080, strain SL 3201

Synonyms
- Chromatium glycolicum

Genus of bacteria

Halochromatium glycolicum is a bacterium from the genus of Halochromatium which has been isolated from microbial mats from the Solar Lake from Sinai in Egypt.
