= Thioflavicoccus =

Scientific classification
- Domain: Bacteria
- Kingdom: Pseudomonadati
- Phylum: Pseudomonadota
- Class: Gammaproteobacteria
- Order: Chromatiales
- Family: Chromatiaceae
- Genus: Thioflavicoccus; Imhoff and Pfennig 2001
- Species: T. mobilis

Binomial name
- Thioflavicoccus mobilis Imhoff and Pfennig 2001

Genus of bacteria

Thioflavicoccus is a Gram-negative, obligately phototrophic, strictly anaerobic and motile genus of bacteria from the family of Chromatiaceae with one known species (Thioflavicoccus mobilis).

Thioflavicoccus mobilis was first discovered during a 1986 "Microbial Diversity" summer course. The microbe was isolated from a flat, laminated microbial mat in a salt marsh and was determined to be a marine bacterium.

The culture was collected from the Great Sippewisset Salt Marsh in Woods Hole, Massachusetts; it was found to be the first purple sulfur bacteria that contained bacteriochlorophyll b as the main photosynthetic pigment. When T. mobilis was first analyzed, it was misidentified as Thiocapsa pfennigii due to its similarities in morphology and structure, but this was later disproved with 16S rDNA sequencing.

== Morphology and structure ==
The average cell size for a well-grown culture of T. mobilis is 0.8 to 1.0 nm (nanometers) in diameter. It has a rod and diplococcus shape before reproduction, and is highly motile with the use of a monopolar monotrichous flagella. T. mobilis stains Gram-negative and has a tubular, intracellular photosynthetic membrane system.

Like Thiococcus pfennigii, T. mobilis ranges from a yellowish-beige to orange-brown tint. However, pigment extractions and co-chromatography showed that 3,4,3',4'-tetrahydrospirilloxanthin is the main carotenoid of T. mobilis. T. mobilis is a strictly anaerobic and obligately phototrophic microbe which uses hydrogen sulfide and elemental sulfur as electron donors in natural environments.

== Genetic ==
The DNA base composition for T. mobilis is 66.5 mol% G+C and T. mobilis reproduces through binary fission. It's closest relative is Thiococcus pfennigii, which the 8320 strain of T. mobilis shares a 91.8% similarity with. After the sequencing of 16S rDNA, it was indicated that T. mobilis should be classified within the family Chromatiaceae. The entire genome has been sequenced, with a genome size of 4.13752 Mb and a protein count of 3538.

== Environment and culture ==
The natural habitat of T. mobilis are laminated microbial mats found within salt marshes. To best culture T. mobilis, pH levels must be between 7.2 and 7.4, salt levels should be at 2% with NaCl being required for growth, and ideal temperatures should be between 25-30 °C. T. mobilis will not grow in oxic and/or microoxic conditions.

T. mobilis was isolated from deep-agar dilution series with an inoculation of a peach-coloured sample (top layer). The cultures were incubated at 20-22 °C with a light intensity of 300–500 lx with the use of a tungsten lamp.
