= Thermochromatium =

Scientific classification
- Domain: Bacteria
- Kingdom: Pseudomonadati
- Phylum: Pseudomonadota
- Class: Gammaproteobacteria
- Order: Chromatiales
- Family: Chromatiaceae
- Genus: Thermochromatium; Imhoff et al. 1998

Type species
- Thermochromatium tepidum

Species
- T. tepidum

Genus of bacteria

Thermochromatium is a Gram-negative and thermophilic genus of bacteria from the family of Chromatiaceae with one known species (Thermochromatium tepidum). The habitats of Thermochromatium tepidum are hot springs which contain sulfide. Thermochromatium tepidum was first isolated from the Mammoth Hot Springs from the Yellowstone National Park in the United States.
