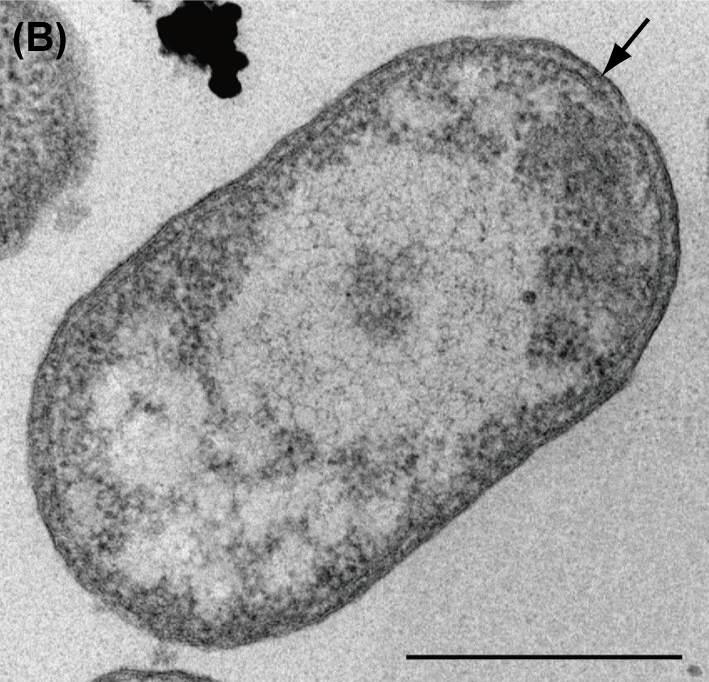
- A thin section cell of Thiolapillus sp. under chemolithoautotrophic conditions

Scientific classification
- Domain: Bacteria
- Kingdom: Pseudomonadati
- Phylum: Pseudomonadota
- Class: Gammaproteobacteria
- Order: Chromatiales
- Family: Sedimenticolaceae
- Genus: Thiolapillus; Nunoura et al. 2015
- Species: T. brandeum

Binomial name
- Thiolapillus brandeum Nunoura et al. 2015

= Thiolapillus =

Genus of bacteria

Thiolapillus is a genus of gram-negative bacteria from the class Gammaproteobacteria with one known species (Thiolapillus brandeum).
