= Rheinheimera =

Scientific classification
- Domain: Bacteria
- Kingdom: Pseudomonadati
- Phylum: Pseudomonadota
- Class: Gammaproteobacteria
- Order: Chromatiales
- Family: Chromatiaceae
- Genus: Rheinheimera; Brettar et al. 2002

Type species
- Rheinheimera baltica

Species
- R. aestuari R. aquimaris R. baltica R. coerulea R. gaetbuli R. hassiensis R. japonica R. marina R. muenzenbergensis R. nanhaiensis R. pacifica R. perlucida R. salexigens R. tuosuensis

Genus of bacteria

Rheinheimera is a genus of bacteria from the family of Chromatiaceae. Rheinheimera is named after the German microbiologist Gerhard Rheinheimer.
