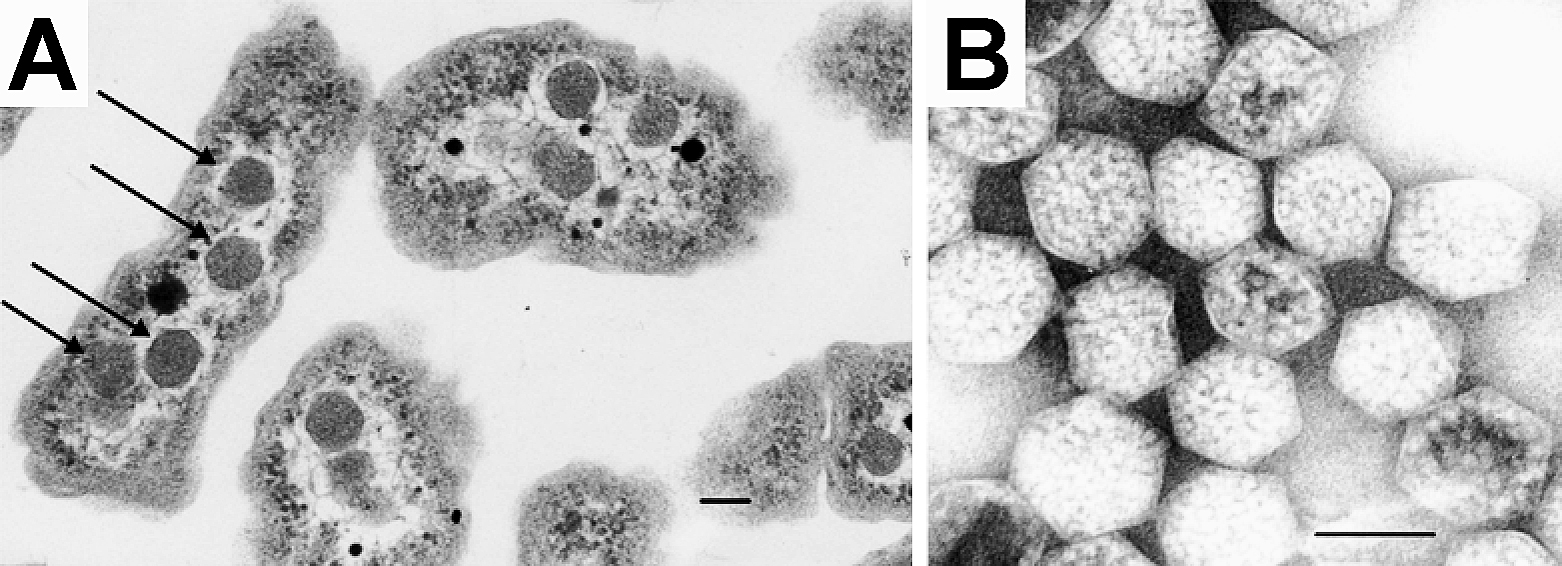
- Halothiobacillus neapolitanus with carboxysomes

Scientific classification
- Domain: Bacteria
- Kingdom: Pseudomonadati
- Phylum: Pseudomonadota
- Class: Gammaproteobacteria
- Order: Chromatiales
- Family: Halothiobacillaceae
- Genus: Halothiobacillus; Kelly and Wood 2000

Species
- Halothiobacillus kellyi Halothiobacillus neapolitanus

= Halothiobacillus =

Genus of bacteria

Halothiobacillus is a genus in the class Gammaproteobacteria. Both species are obligate aerobic bacteria; they require oxygen to grow. They are also halotolerant; they live in environments with high concentrations of salt or other solutes, but don't require them in order to grow.

The type species of this genus, Halothiobacillus neapolitanus used to be members of the genus Thiobacillus, before they were reclassified in 2000. A further two former Thiobacillus spp. were also reclassified as Halothiobacillus halophilus and Halothiobacillus hydrothermalis, both of which were obligate halophiles rather than being halotolerant and showed comparatively low 16S rRNA gene identity to Halothiobacillus neapolitanus and so were reclassified to the newly designated genus Guyparkeria in 2017, as Guyparkeria halophila and Guyparkeria hydrothermalis.

== Environmental importance ==
Halothiobacillus spp. and other chemolithoautotrophic organisms play an important role in global carbon and sulfur cycles. They are able to depend entirely on inorganic compounds (CO_{2} and reduced sulfur) for their carbon and energy needs, but can assimilate some Krebs cycle intermediates during autotrophic growth.

== Species ==
- Halothiobacillus kellyi
- Halothiobacillus neapolitanus (basonym: Thiobacillus neapolitanus), the type strain of which is ParkerX^{T}, isolated from decomposing concrete in the sewer outfall of Melbourne, Australia by Cecil David 'Guy' Parker in the 1940s - this strain is now a common model organism for autotrophy research, in particular study of carboxysomes and their role in carbon concentration and maintaining RuBisCO efficiency during autotrophic growth.
