= Thiophaeococcus mangrovi =

Scientific classification
- Domain: Bacteria
- Kingdom: Pseudomonadati
- Phylum: Pseudomonadota
- Class: Gammaproteobacteria
- Order: Chromatiales
- Family: Chromatiaceae
- Genus: Thiophaeococcus
- Species: T. mangrovi

Binomial name
- Thiophaeococcus mangrovi Anil Kumar et al. 2008

Type strain
- DSM 19863, JCM 14889, strain JA304

Synonyms
- Neothiorhodococcus bhitarkanikensis

Genus of bacteria

Thiophaeococcus mangrovi is a Gram-negative bacterium from the genus of Thiophaeococcus which has been isolated from mud from the Bhitarkanika mangrove forest from Orissa in India.
