= Sulfur globule =

A sulfur globule is an intracellular, and sometimes extracellular, aggregate used by various sulfur oxidizing bacteria as storage for elemental sulfur. Sulfur globules were first explained in 1887 by Sergei Winogradsky, and their complete structure and chemical composition has been a debate since then. More recently, tools of fluorescence microscopy and genomics have begun to shed light on the structure, formation, and function of sulfur globules.

Further, sulfur globules have been primarily described in chemoautotrophs and phototrophs belonging to the phylum proteobacteria. Sulfur globules can be formed and deposited intracellularly or extracellularly. The formation of extracellular sulfur globules is generally characteristic of green sulfur bacteria and sulfur oxidizers from the family Ectothiorhodospiraceae, whereas intracellular sulfur globules are more typical of magnetotactic sulfur oxidizers, purple sulfur bacteria from the Chromatiaceae family, as well as sulfur-oxidizing bacterial endosymbionts.

Currently, the model organism for studying the structure and function of these sulfur globules is Allochromatium vinosum.

== Model organism Allochromatium vinosum ==
Allochromatium vinosum is a purple sulfur bacteria, belonging to the Chromatiaceae family, that oxidizes both thiosulfate and sulfide from its surrounding environments. While A. vinosum is usually found in lakes or ponds, it can also be found in sewage lagoons or salt marshes, where it plays an important role in re-oxidizing sulfide produced from the sulfate-reducing bacteria in its immediate environment.

Modern technologies including fluorescence microscopy, proteomics, genomics, and other molecular methods have shed light onto the location and structure of sulfur globules in A. vinosum. Such methods have demonstrated that these sulfur globules are about 1 micrometer in diameter and can make up approximately 34% of the cellular dry weight. Structure wise, A. vinosum sulfur globules generally consist of three hydrophobic proteins: SgpA, SgpB, and SgpC. These 3 proteins are essential to the formation, expansion, and degradation of sulfur globules, though their complete function is still being explored. Sulfur globules in A. vinosum are intracellular- meaning within the cell wall- but are located in the periplasm along with essential periplasmic sulfur oxidizing enzymes and thiosulfate. Research on the A. vinosum species has also helped to explain the mechanisms by which sulfur globule-containing bacteria decompose said sulfur globules. Perhaps the most studied of these mechanisms involves the dissimilatory sulfite reductase genes, otherwise denoted as the dsr genes.

== General structure ==
Intracellular sulfur globules are generally round in shape, and have a diameter that ranges from 1 μm-3 μm, however, some have been found to be larger than 15 μm. The chemical composition of sulfur globules can vary between bacterial species. Purple sulfur bacteria contain globules that consist of long sulfur chains. Chemotrophic sulfur oxidizers such as Beggiatoa alba and Thiomargarita namibiensis contain cyclo-octasulfur as their primary form. Other species, namely Acidithiobacillus ferrooxidans, store sulfur as long chains of polythionates.

Likewise, techniques in X-ray absorption structure analysis have indicated that the sulfur chains found within these globules usually contain organic end groups and resemble the sulfur found in purple sulfur bacteria- implying that the process of sulfur globule formation in bacteria may be a phylogenetically ancient trait.

== Cellular location ==
The location of intracellular sulfur globules varies throughout bacterial species. Oftentimes, they are found in the periplasm, along with the presence of active sulfur oxidizing enzymes. Sulfur globules in the model organism A. vinosum, for instance, have been shown to be located in the periplasm based on evidence from peptide coding sequences present in the globule envelope. They have also been found to be scattered asymmetrically, for example in Thiovulum, where they congregate to one pole of the cell.

Many sulfur globules are enclosed by electron dense layers (2-14 nm thick) that resemble cytoskeletal keratins or proteins of a plant cell wall. Thioalkalivibrio, Beggiatoa, and Thiothrix are species of bacteria that this layer is present in. Analyses of the genome dealing with proteins that encode common sulfur globule proteins show that they are found among many sulfur oxidizing bacteria.

== Function in bacteria ==
Intracellular and extracellular sulfur globules serve as a temporary reservoir for sulfur in bacteria that oxidize reduced sulfur compounds such as hydrogen sulfide, thiosulfate, or sulfite. These globules allow bacteria to store sulfur, when abundant, to be utilized when conditions become less favorable. This enables the bacteria to better survive while providing a metabolic advantage in fluctuating environments.

In addition to serving as temporary energy reserves, research has also demonstrated that the pool of sulfur in intracellular globules may also act as a buffer in reduction-oxidation reactions that take place in phototrophic sulfur bacteria.
