= Isochromatium =

Scientific classification
- Domain: Bacteria
- Kingdom: Pseudomonadati
- Phylum: Pseudomonadota
- Class: Gammaproteobacteria
- Order: Chromatiales
- Family: Chromatiaceae
- Genus: Isochromatium; Imhoff et al. 1998

Type species
- Isochromatium buderi

Species
- I. buderi

Genus of bacteria

Isochromatium is a Gram-negative, obligately phototrophic and strictly anaerobic genus of bacteria from the family of Chromatiaceae with one known species (Isochromatium buderi).
