= Thiophaeococcus =

Scientific classification
- Domain: Bacteria
- Kingdom: Pseudomonadati
- Phylum: Pseudomonadota
- Class: Gammaproteobacteria
- Order: Chromatiales
- Family: Chromatiaceae
- Genus: Thiophaeococcus; Anil Kumar et al. 2008

Type species
- Thiophaeococcus mangrovi

Species
- T. fuscus T. mangrovi

Synonyms
- Neothiorhodococcus

Genus of bacteria

Thiophaeococcus is a genus of bacteria from the family of Chromatiaceae.
