= Pararheinheimera =

Scientific classification
- Domain: Bacteria
- Kingdom: Pseudomonadati
- Phylum: Pseudomonadota
- Class: Gammaproteobacteria
- Order: Chromatiales
- Family: Chromatiaceae
- Genus: Pararheinheimera; Sisinthy et al. 2017

Species
- P. chironomi P. aquatica P. arenilitoris P. mesophila P. soli P. tangshanensis P. texasensis P. tilapiae

Genus of bacteria

Pararheinheimera is a genus of bacteria from the family of Chromatiaceae.
