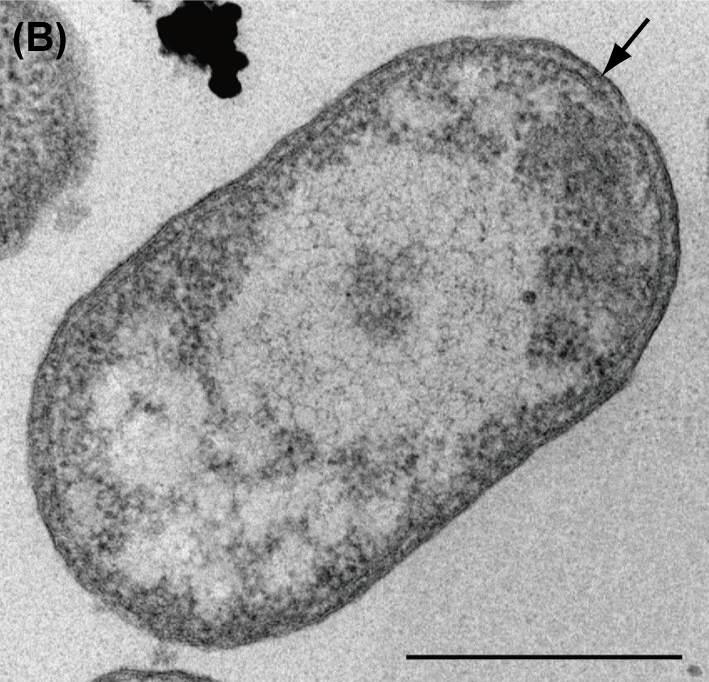
- A thin section cell of Thiolapillus sp. under chemolithoautotrophic conditions.

Scientific classification
- Domain: Bacteria
- Kingdom: Pseudomonadati
- Phylum: Pseudomonadota
- Class: Gammaproteobacteria
- Order: Chromatiales
- Family: Sedimenticolaceae; Slobodkina et al. 2024

Type genus
- Sedimenticola Narasingarao and Häggblom 2006

Genera
- "Candidatus Endoriftia" Robidart et al. 2008; "Magnetovirga" Sirinelli-Kojadinovic et al. 2025; Sedimenticola Narasingarao and Häggblom 2006; "Candidatus Thiodiazotropha" König et al. 2016; Thiolapillus Nunoura et al. 2015

= Sedimenticolaceae =

Family of bacteria

Sedimenticolaceae is a family of bacteria of the order Chromatiales within the Gammaproteobacteria. The family was proposed upon the discovery of Sedimenticola hydrogenitrophicus in samples isolated from a terrestrial mud volcano.

Like other Proteobacteria, the Sedimenticolaceae are Gram-negative and some members are chemolithoautotrophic (similar to the Halothiobacillaceae and Thioalkalibacteraceae).
