= Vampirococcus =

Scientific classification (Candidatus)
- Domain: Bacteria
- Phylum: Minisyncoccota
- Class: "Gracilibacteria"
- Order: "Absconditabacterales"
- Family: "Absconditicoccaceae"
- Genus: "Ca. "Vampirococcus" Guerrero et al. 1986

Type species
- "Ca. Vampirococcus lugosii" Moreira et al. 2021

Species
- "Ca. V. lugosii"

Genus of bacteria

Vampirococcus is an informally described genus of ovoid Gram-negative bacteria, but the exact phylogeny remains to be determined. This predatory prokaryote was first described in 1983 by Esteve et al. as small, anaerobic microbe about 0.6 μm wide before being given the name of Vampirococcus in 1986 by Guerrero et al. This prokaryote is a freshwater obligate predator that preys specifically on various species of the photosynthetic purple sulfur bacterium, Chromatium. As an epibiont, Vampirococcus attaches to the cell surface of their prey and "sucks" out the cytoplasm using a specialized cytoplasmic bridge. They are commonly mentioned as an example of epibionts when discussing strategies employed by bacterial predators. This microbe still has yet to be classified based on genomic sequencing or 16S rRNA because it cannot be sustained long enough outside its natural environment to isolate a pure culture.

== Characterization ==
Vampirococcus is a predatory prokaryotic genus that lives in anaerobic, aquatic conditions. This bacterium is distinguished from other predatory prokaryotes because it feeds upon its prey using epibiosis (also see epibiont). Vampirococcus cells are small and ovoid, being only 0.6μm wide. This small size is characteristic of prokaryotes - as they are smaller than eukaryotic cells - and is beneficial for predatory species, as discussed in the Prey and Predation section below. In addition, Vampirococcus specifically preys upon various species within the bacterial genus, Chromatium, a freshwater purple sulfur bacteria. Because Chromatium is a primary producer as a phototroph, it has been suggested that Vampirococcus could be considered a primary consumer as a predator of photosynthetic bacteria.

There is some disagreement in the scientific community regarding Vampirococcus's motility. Many papers have stated that this specific predatory prokaryote does not have cilia or flagella, rendering the prokaryote immotile. However, recent scientific papers have begun to describe Vampirococcus specifically with a single polar flagellum that allows it to interact with potential prey in its environment. Other recent articles have referred to Vampirococcus as part of a group of similar organisms known as BALOs (Bdellovibrio And Like Organisms) which are known to be very motile predatory microbes. It is difficult to find recent research specifically about Vampirococcus that elaborates on this topic, so the motility of this organism should be addressed with caution until further research clarifies the matter.

== Genomics and phylogeny ==
As of now, the genome of Vampirococcus has not been sequenced, and the phylogeny and taxonomy of the microbe have not been determined. Despite this fact, Vampirococcus has now been included in a group of microbes known as BALOs, or Bdellovibrio And Like Organisms. These organisms are Gram-negative, obligate predators that exhibit either epibiotic predation or intracellular periplasmic predation. Although these microbes are similar in function, grouping them together does not indicate any close phylogenetic or evolutionary relationships. Only a small portion of the microbes included in BALO have been genetically sequenced. Because Vampirococcus is difficult to culture and sustain in a laboratory outside of its natural environment. Without a pure, isolated culture of this organism, more information regarding its genome, genes, evolutionary relationships with other microbes, cellular functions, and behavior cannot be attained.

== Habitat ==
Currently, Vampirococcus has only been found in two freshwater lakes in northeastern Spain: Lake Estanya and Lake Cisó. These lakes were formed in karst areas where rocks underground have been dissolved by groundwater. High concentrations of calcium sulfate and hydrogen sulfide make the lakes anoxic, providing an anaerobic environment to sustain both Vampirococcus and its prey, Chromatium. Cell concentrations of Vampirococcus are highest during the fall months and are indirectly proportional to the cell concentrations of Chromatium, an indication of Vampirococcus's predation.

== Prey and predation ==
Predatory microbes attack and feed off of prey through extracellular or intracellular methods. Since predatory prokaryotes are smaller than their prey, they cannot engulf, or phagocytize, the larger bacteria. This difference in ability and size may have led to the evolution of different predation methods. Vampirococcus utilizes epibiotic predation to feed on specifically on various species of Chromatium. Epibiosis is an extracellular method of predation and requires cell to cell contact between predator and prey. This is the only way in which this predatory acquires nutrients to grow. The steps of Vampirococcus's predation are as follows:

1. When the predator cell finds its prey – through chemotaxis or quorum sensing – it attaches to the prey's cell membrane via a cytoplasmic bridge structure. At first, this attachment is reversible but soon becomes permanent.
2. Vampirococcus then secretes hydrolytic enzymes into the Chromatium bacterium to digest and degrade the cytoplasm.
3. The nutrients are directly transported into the predator cell. According to observations, Vampirococcus appears to "suck" out the contents like a vampire.
4. Once the prokaryote has used all the prey's nutrients and reproduced, Vampirococcus leaves the Chromatium cell dead. All that remains of the prey are the cell membrane and a few intercellular components.

As stated previously, Vampirococcus solely preys upon species of Chromatium, a phototrophic purple sulfur bacterium that lives in freshwater. As a bacterium, Chromatium is much larger than Vampirococcus. The benefit of preying on larger microbes is the sheer abundance of nutrients and resources from one individual. In 1986, Guerrero et al. observed that a single Chromatium could sustain up to six Vampirococcus simultaneously. In contrast, predators larger than their prey must phagocytize multiple microbes in order to receive sufficient nutrition.

== Reproduction ==
Vampirococcus can exist freely in its aquatic environment without being attached to another microbe. However, this prokaryote only reproduces when it is attached to a prey bacterium which makes it an obligate predator. Reproduction occurs via binary fission to produce two daughter cells. Vampirococcus does not use Chromatium's cellular machinery to reproduce like a virus. It only uses the bacterium as a source of nutrition, and attachment is merely a requirement for reproduction.

== Future research ==
Research was being conducted in 2005 to evaluate whether or not predatory prokaryotes can be used in other ways to degrade biofilms and cancerous tumor cells. It has been suggested that if predatory microbes attack and kill a certain type of microbe, then they may exhibit the same behavior toward a cell with characteristics similar to their normal prey. Certain BALOs are already being considered for these specific tasks, particularly Bdellovibrio bacteriovorus. Once Vampirococcus is more thoroughly researched and understood, it too could potentially be used to treat cancer or biofilms.
