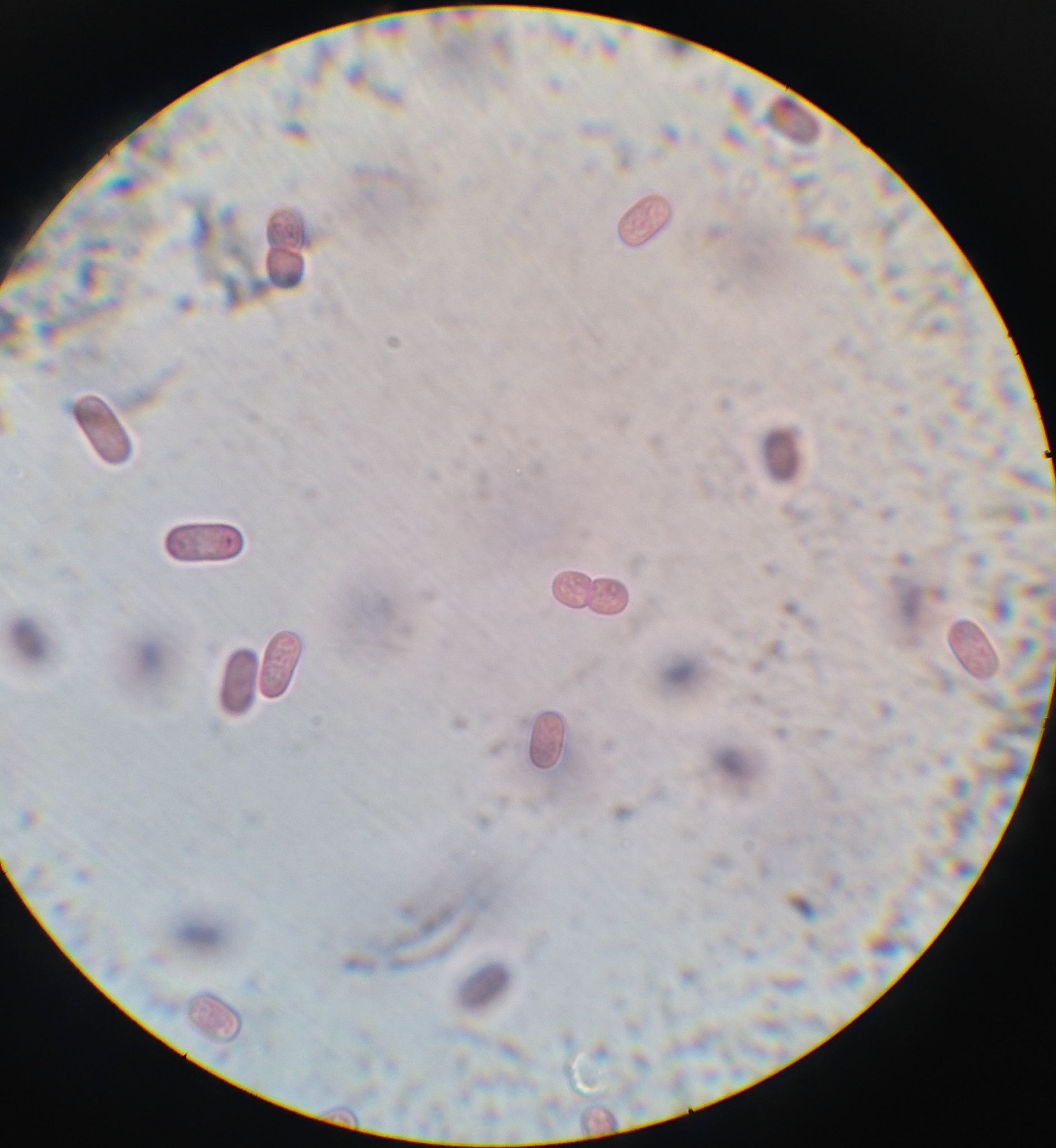
- C. okenii in the microscope at 600x magnification.

Scientific classification
- Domain: Bacteria
- Kingdom: Pseudomonadati
- Phylum: Pseudomonadota
- Class: Gammaproteobacteria
- Order: Chromatiales
- Family: Chromatiaceae
- Genus: Chromatium
- Species: C. okenii

Binomial name
- Chromatium okenii (Ehrenberg 1838) Perty 1852 (Approved Lists 1980)

Synonyms
- Monas okenii Ehrenberg 1838; Rhabdomonas rosea Cohn 1875; Spirillum violaceum Warming 1875; Bacterium okenii (Ehrenberg 1838) Trevisan 1879; Beggiatoa roseopersicina Zopf 1883; Rhabdochromatium roseum (Cohn 1875) Winogradsky 1888; Rhabdochromatium fusiforme Winogradsky 1888; Bacillus okenii (Ehrenberg 1838) Trevisan 1889; Mantegazzea winogradskyi Trevisan 1889; Mantegazzea rosea (Cohn 1875) Trevisan 1889; Pseudomonas okenii (Ehrenberg 1838) Migula 1895; Thiospirillum violaceum (Warming 1875) Migula 1900; Chromatium densegranulatum Skuja 1948

= Chromatium okenii =

Species of bacterium

Chromatium okenii is a Gram-negative bacterium found in water. It is a purple sulfur bacterium. These bacteria are capable of photosynthesis and use Hydrogen sulfide (H_{2}S) as an electron donor for CO_{2} reduction and so do not produce oxygen. This type of photosynthesis is called anoxygenic photosynthesis. Chromatium okenii is anaerobic and the cells are slightly curved or straight rods.
