= Thioalkalibacter =

Scientific classification
- Domain: Bacteria
- Kingdom: Pseudomonadati
- Phylum: Pseudomonadota
- Class: Gammaproteobacteria
- Order: Chromatiales
- Family: Thioalkalibacteraceae
- Genus: Thioalkalibacter; Banciu et al. 2009

Type species
- Thioalkalibacter halophilus

Species
- T. halophilus

Genus of bacteria

Thioalkalibacter is a faculatively alkaliphilic and halophilic genus of bacteria from the family of Thioalkalibacteraceae with one known species (Thioalkalibacter halophilus).
