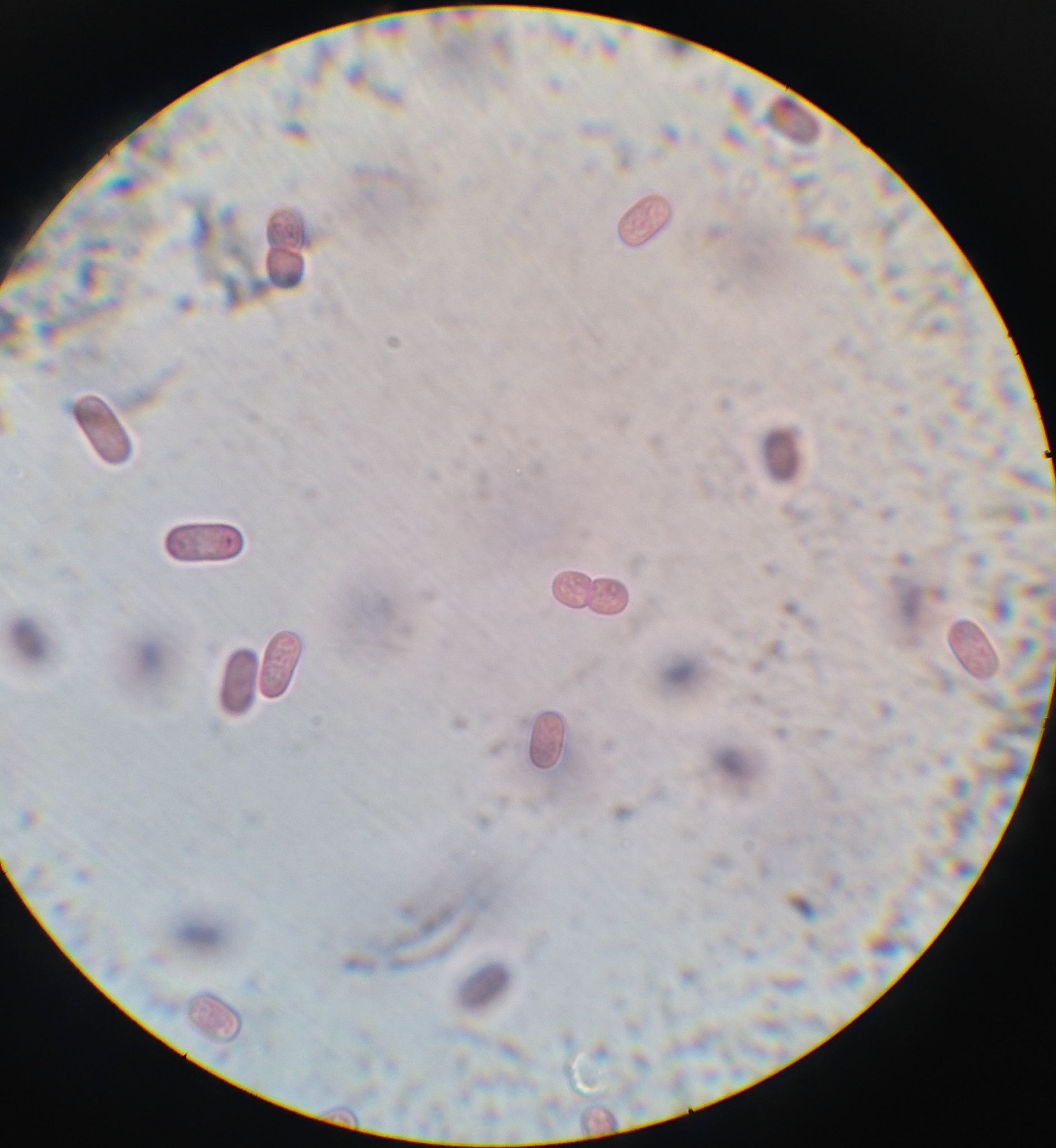
- Chromatium okenii in the microscope at 600x magnification.

Scientific classification
- Domain: Bacteria
- Kingdom: Pseudomonadati
- Phylum: Pseudomonadota
- Class: Gammaproteobacteria
- Order: Chromatiales
- Family: Chromatiaceae
- Genus: Chromatium; Perty 1852

Type species
- Chromatium okenii

Species
- C. buderi C. glycolicum C. gracile C. minus C. minutissimum C. okenii C. purpuratum C. salexigens C. tepidum C. vinosum C. violascens C. armingii C. weisii

= Chromatium =

Bacteria

Chromatium is a genus of photoautotrophic Gram-negative bacteria which are found in water. The cells are straight rod-shaped or slightly curved. They belong to the purple sulfur bacteria and oxidize sulfide to produce sulfur which is deposited in intracellular granules of the cytoplasm.
