= Allochromatium =

Scientific classification
- Domain: Bacteria
- Kingdom: Pseudomonadati
- Phylum: Pseudomonadota
- Class: Gammaproteobacteria
- Order: Chromatiales
- Family: Chromatiaceae
- Genus: Allochromatium

Genus of bacteria

Allochromatium is a genus of bacteria in the family Chromatiaceae.

== Species ==
- Allochromatium humboldtianum
- Allochromatium minutissimum
- Allochromatium phaeobacterium
- Allochromatium renukae
- Allochromatium vinosum
- Allochromatium warmingii
