= Phaeochromatium =

Scientific classification
- Missing taxonomy template (fix): Phaeochromatium

Type species
- Phaeochromatium fluminis

Species
- P. fluminis

Genus of bacteria

Phaeochromatium is a genus of bacteria from the family of Chromatiaceae with one known species (Phaeochromatium fluminis).
