= Chollangi =

- village
- Interactive map of Chollangi
- Location in Andhra Pradesh, India Chollangi (India)
- Coordinates: 16.80°N 82.23°E
- Country: India
- State: Andhra Pradesh
- District: Kakinada

Population (2001)
  - Total: 3,000

Languages
  - Official: Telugu
- Time zone: UTC+5:30 (IST)
- PIN: 533461

Chollangi is a village in Thallarevu Mandal in Kakinada district, Andhra Pradesh, India.
