= Thioalkalibacteraceae =

Scientific classification
- Domain: Bacteria
- Kingdom: Pseudomonadati
- Phylum: Pseudomonadota
- Class: Gammaproteobacteria
- Order: Chromatiales
- Family: Thioalkalibacteraceae

Genera
- Thioalkalibacter; Guyparkeria

Family of bacteria

The Thioalkalibacteraceae are a family of extremophiles, namely halophilic, alkaliphilic or alkalitolerant, mesophilic to thermophilic obligately chemolithoautotrophic organisms in the Chromatiales comprising the genus Thioalkalibacter and Guyparkeria. The family is closely related to the family Halothiobacillaceae of halotolerant, mesophilic obligate autotrophs.

The type genus of the family is Thioalkalibacter, and both genera in the family are obligate autotrophs that fix carbon dioxide into biological material using the Calvin-Benson-Bassham cycle (using form IAc RuBisCO) and oxidise sulfur oxyanions, sulfide and elementary sulfur as their electron donor. All genera use ubiquinone-8 as their major respiratory quinone and have a G+C fraction of 54-68 mol%. Unlikely the closely related family the Halothiobacillaceae, no detectable polythionate intermediates of sulfur oxidation are detectable, and the Thioalkalibacteracaceae are obligate halophiles rather than halotolerant, as well as alkaliphilic or alkalitolerant, rather than mesophilic or acidotolerant.
