= Halothiobacillaceae =

Scientific classification
- Domain: Bacteria
- Kingdom: Pseudomonadati
- Phylum: Pseudomonadota
- Class: Gammaproteobacteria
- Order: Chromatiales
- Family: Halothiobacillaceae; Kelly and Wood 2005

Genera
- Halothiobacillus; Thiofaba; Thiovirga

Family of bacteria

The Halothiobacillaceae are a family of halotolerant, mesophilic, and obligate chemolithoautotrophic organisms in the Chromatiales comprising the genus Halothiobacillus. It is closely related to the family Thioalkalibacteraceae of halophilic obligate autotrophs with distinct morphological and genomic features.
