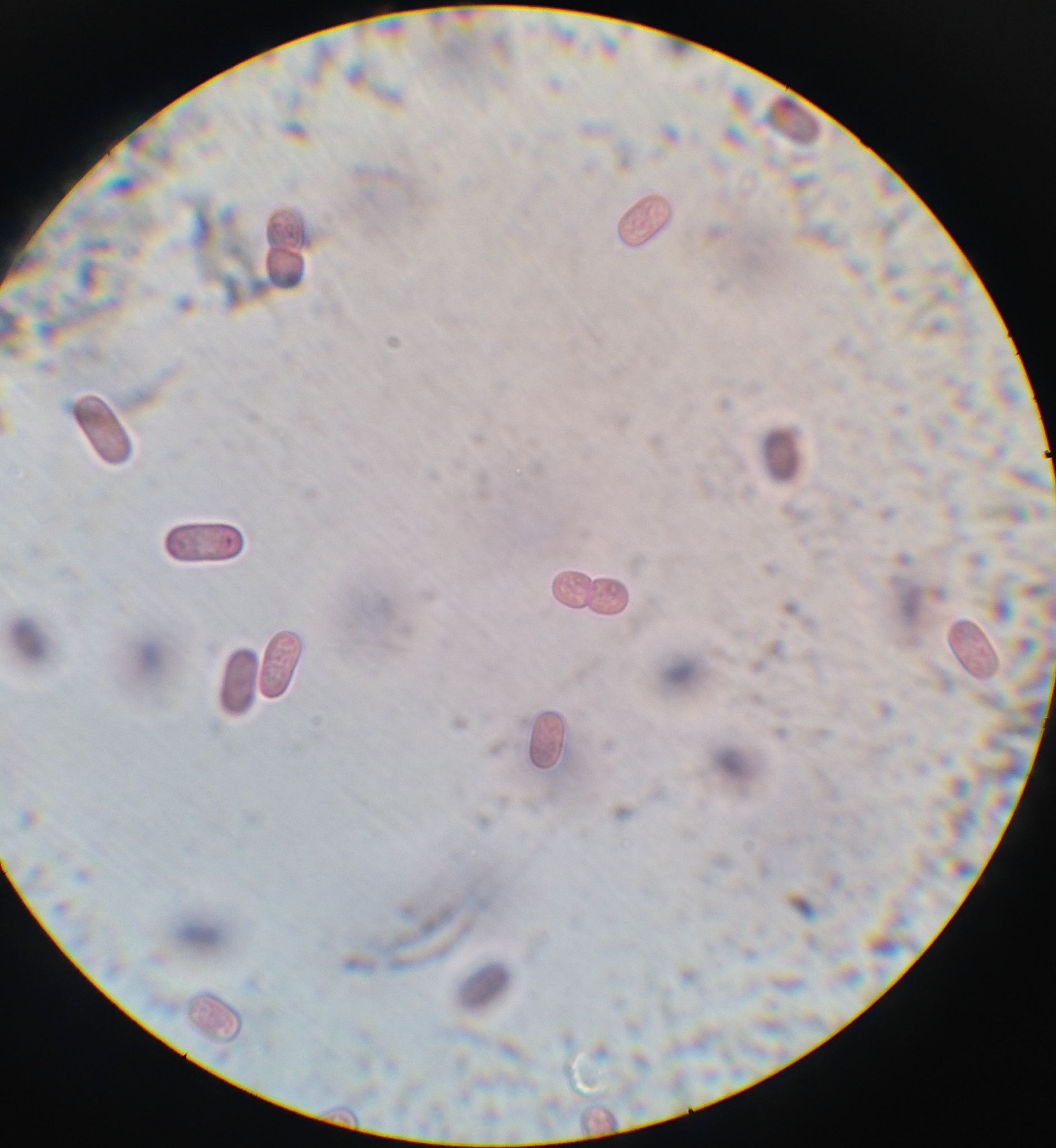
- Microscopic image (600x magnification) of the species Chromatium okenii, belonging to the family Chromatiaceae

Scientific classification
- Domain: Bacteria
- Kingdom: Pseudomonadati
- Phylum: Pseudomonadota
- Class: Gammaproteobacteria
- Order: Chromatiales
- Family: Chromatiaceae; Bavendamm 1924 (Approved Lists 1980)

Genera
- "Ca. Nitrosoglobus" Hayatsu et al. 2017; "Ca. Tenderia" Eddie et al. 2017; "Pararheinheimera" Sisinthy et al. 2017; "Rhodothece" Molisch 1906; "Thioflavicoccus" Imhoff and Pfennig 2001; "Thiothece" Winogradsky 1888; "Vampirococcus" Guerrero et al. 1986; Alishewanella Fonnesbech Vogel et al. 2000; Allochromatium Imhoff et al. 1998; Amoebobacter Winogradsky 1888 (Approved Lists 1980); Caldichromatium Saini et al. 2020; Chromatium Perty 1852 (Approved Lists 1980); Halochromatium Imhoff et al. 1998; Imhoffiella Nupur et al. 2017; Isochromatium Imhoff et al. 1998; Lamprobacter Gorlenko et al. 1988; Lamprocystis Schroeter 1886 (Approved Lists 1980); Marichromatium Imhoff et al. 1998; Monas; Nitrosococcus Winogradsky 1892 (Approved Lists 1980); Ophidomonas; Pfennigia Tindall 1999; Phaeobacterium Nupur et al. 2015; Phaeochromatium Shivalia et al. 2012; Rhabdochromatium (ex Winogradsky 1888) Dilling et al. 1996; Rheinheimera Brettar et al. 2002; Thermochromatium Imhoff et al. 1998; Thialkalicoccus Bryantseva et al. 2000; Thiobaca Rees et al. 2002; Thiocapsa Winogradsky 1888 (Approved Lists 1980); Thiococcus (ex Eimhjellen et al. 1967) Imhoff et al. 1998; Thiocystis Winogradsky 1888 (Approved Lists 1980); Thiodictyon Winogradsky 1888 (Approved Lists 1980); Thiohalocapsa Imhoff et al. 1998; Thiolamprovum Guyoneaud et al. 1998; Thiopedia Winogradsky 1888 (Approved Lists 1980); Thiophaeococcus Anil Kumar et al. 2008; Thiorhodococcus Guyoneaud et al. 1998; Thiorhodovibrio Overmann et al. 1993; Thiospirillum Winogradsky 1888 (Approved Lists 1980)

= Chromatiaceae =

Family of purple sulfur bacteria

The Chromatiaceae are one of the two families of purple sulfur bacteria, together with the Ectothiorhodospiraceae. They belong to the order Chromatiales of the class Gammaproteobacteria, which is composed of gram-negative bacteria. Most of the species are photolithoautotrophs and conduct an anoxygenic photosynthesis, but there are also representatives capable of growing under dark and/or microaerobic conditions as either chemolithoautotrophs or chemoorganoheterotrophs.

Both Ectothiorhodospiraceae and Chromatiaceae bacteria produce elemental sulfur globules, the difference is that in the second case they are stored inside the cells rather than outside. Sulfur is an intermediate in the oxidization of sulfide, which is ultimately converted into sulfate, and may serve as a reserve.

== History of classification ==
Although purple sulfur bacteria have been known for some time, the difficulty in cultivating these microorganisms in the laboratory has made that few scientific depositions are available to date, and even less are those that provide comparative studies between the two families of the order: Chromatiaceae and Ectothiorhodospiraceae. This is evidenced by the fact that most of the publications at disposal of the scientific community are the result of the work of a relatively small number of scientists, first of all Norbert Pfennig, Johannes Imhoff and Jörg Overmann.

The taxonomy of these two families was originally drawn up entirely on characteristics easy to observe, such as the storage of elemental sulfur inside or outside the cells, the presence of gas vesicles and the internal membrane systems. This led to a first subdivision based on phenotypic properties without taking into account the phylogenetic relationships between the two families.

The first taxonomic system (1907) was based on the Molisch's pigment and the storage of elemental sulfur. According to these traits, Molisch made a first distinction of the purple sulfur bacteria into two groups: the Thiorhodaceae, including all the members that store globules of elemental sulfur inside their cells, and the Athiorhodaceae, without this feature. These two groups appeared as families of the order Pseudomonadales in the Bergey's Manual of Determinative Bacteriology, 7th ed. In the next edition, they were split in the Rhodospirillaceae (Pfennig and Triiper, 1971) and the Chromatiaceae (Bavendamm, 1924), respectively.

Then, the term Chromatiaceae was used for the first time by Bavendamm in 1924, in particular as referred to all those purple bacteria which follow the pathway of anoxygenic photosynthesis, that is to say without using water as electron donor (and consequently without oxygen production), but rather oxidizing sulfide and storing the resulting sulfur either inside or outside the cells. As a consequence of this definition, both the bacteria that accumulate sulfur inside (current Chromatiaceae) and outside the cells (current Ectothiorhodospiraceae) were initially grouped together.

With the development of chemotaxonomy and DNA sequencing, thanks to analyses on 16S rRNA and pufLM genes as well as on some peculiar phenotypic features (such as lipid and fatty acid composition, quinone structure and amino acid sequence of cytochrome c_{551}), it was possible to demonstrate the phylogenetic distance between the two families. This emerging data led Imhoff (1984) to redefine them: he assigned the genus Ectothiorhodospira (Pelsh, 1936) to a new family called Ectothiorhodospiraceae, and the genus Chromatium (Perty, 1852) to the family Chromatiaceae.

Referring to the latest definition, Chromatiaceae family includes only those purple sulfur bacteria that perform anoxygenic photosynthesis and store elemental sulfur inside their cells. This is in line with the first Molisch definition of the Thiorhodaceae group and reflects the distance, but phylogenetic correlation between the two families. Therefore, the current taxonomic system for Chromatiaceae corresponds primarily to the phylogenetic knowledge, but it also takes into account phenotypic characteristics and ecological features, which allow to broadly distinguish the members of this family to the Ectothiorhodospiraceae ones. For example, the pH and the response to salinity play an important role in terms of ecological distribution: the species belonging to the family Ectothiorodospiraceae prefer basic pH and habitats with high salt concentration, while the optimal conditions for the Chromatiaceae species include a pH close to neutral and a higher range of salinity, enabling them to occupy more varied habitats, from fresh to brackish and marine water.

The Chromatiaceae bacteria have been divided into four major phylogenetic branches set on the basis of all the aforementioned information:

1. Allochromatium spp., Thermochromatium spp., Thiocystis spp. and Chromatium okenii. They share some cytological properties, such as rod-shaped or spherical cells, flagellar movements and the absence of vesicles. This group includes the most versatile species of the family Chromatiaceae: although they are considered primarily freshwater bacteria as they do not have a specific need for salt, some members can grow under low salinity conditions and thus also in brackish and marine habitats.
2. Thiocapsa spp., Thiolamprovum spp., Thiobaca spp., Lamprocystis spp. and Thiodictyon spp. As well as in the previous case, the members of this group are primarily freshwater bacteria, even if some of them can be salt tolerant enough to grow in coastal habitats. Thiocapsa roseopersicina and Lamprocystis roseopersicina are among the well-known species of this group; the first one lacks gas vesicles, while in the second one gas vesicles and flagella-dependent movements occur.
3. Marichromatium spp. and Thiorhodococcus spp. They are typical marine bacteria and capable of flagellar movements, but they differ from each other for their cell shape, which is rod and spherical, respectively. The species Thiophaeococcus mangrovi is associated to this group.
4. The fourth group is phylogenetically more distant to the others and is composed by halophilic (Halochromatium spp. and Thiohalocapsa spp.), marine (Thiorhodovibrio spp., Rhabdochromatium spp. and Isochromatium spp.) and bacteriochlorophyll b-containing genera (Thiococcus spp., Thioflavicoccus spp. and Thioalkalicoccus spp.). Some species belonging to the last three genera are characterized by the presence of tubular internal membranes, a feature which distinguishes them from all the other genera of the family Chromatiaceae, which instead have internal membrane systems arranged as vesicles.

== Distinctive features ==
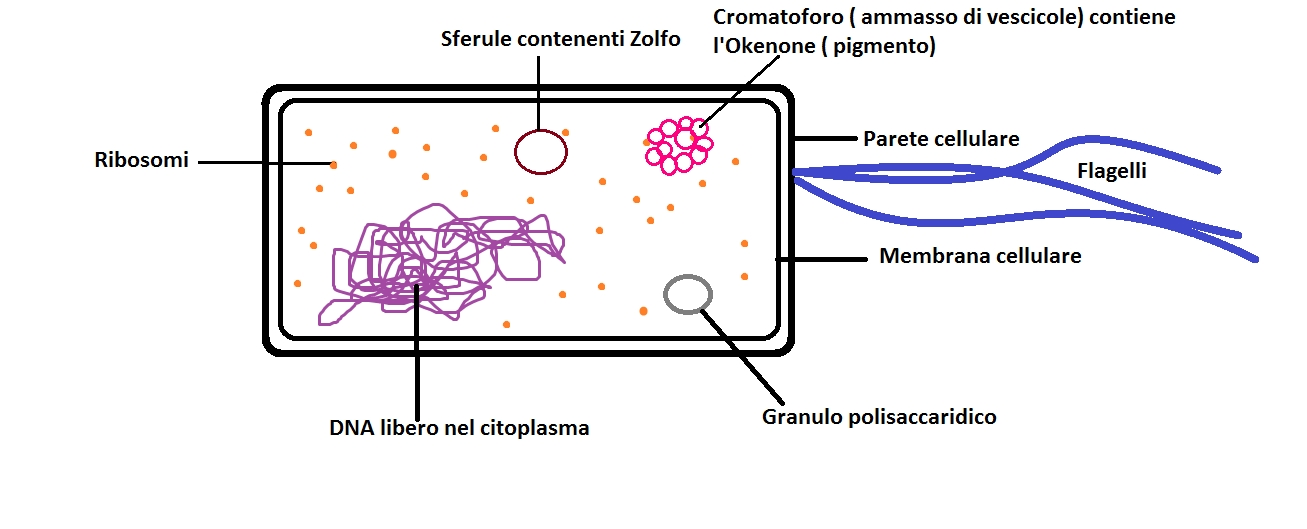
Schematic cellular structure of the species Chromatium okenii. Note the presence of those distinctive features found in many members of the family Chromatiaceae, such as the sulfur globules (red circle on the top) and the vesicles containing the pigment okenone (pink cluster on the right).

There is a great variety among Chromatiaceae species. From a physiological and morphological point of view, individual members can be distinguished from each other on the basis of cell size and shape (sphere, rod, vibrio, spirillum), motility (polar flagella-dependent motility or nonmotile members), presence of gas vesicles and ability to form cellular aggregates.

Unlike Ectothiorhodospiraceae and Chlorobiaceae bacteria, which store elemental sulfur outside their cells, the intracellularly formed elemental sulfur by Chromatiaceae bacteria gives them great advantages. The chemical element, as it is inaccessible to other bacteria, could serve as a useful personal reserve:

- of electron donors for photosynthesis in the case of external sulfide depletion;
- of electron acceptors for endogenous respiration in the absence of light (dark, oxic conditions);
- of electron acceptors for endogenous fermentation in the absence of both light and oxygen (dark, anoxic conditions).

Regarding their photosynthetic pigment composition, in the Chromatiaceae can be found bacteriochlorophyll a or b and different types of carotenoids, according to the species. They confer to these bacteria their characteristic pigmentation, and if the amount of cells in the medium is high enough, the coloring may also be visible to the naked eye. Most of them have bacteriochlorophyll a, with a maximum absorption wavelength of 800-900 nm, and a number of species uniquely biosynthesize the red-colored aromatic carotenoid okenone. Okenone has an absorption peak around 500 nm and is involved in both photosynthesis and photoprotection. Bacteriochlorophylls and carotenoids are part of the light-harvesting complex; together with the reaction center, this one makes up the photosynthetic apparatus of Chromatiaceae, which is localized within an intracytoplasmic membrane system arranged as vesicles or tubules, depending on the species. Those able to synthesize okenone are advantaged in deeper water layers, since water absorbs the longer wavelengths in the upper 10 meters thus limiting the use of bacteriochlorophylls for light harvesting.

== Metabolism ==
Out of a metabolic point of view, Chromatiaceae bacteria are divided into two main groups: specialized and versatile species. The specialized species are obligate anaerobic photolithoautotrophs, they use reduced sulfur compounds as electron donors and photoassimilate exclusively acetate and pyruvate (or propionate). This group does not include chemotrophs. The versatile species photoassimilate a wider range of organic substrates and most of them do not require the presence of reduced sulfur compounds for their growth, since they are also capable of alternative metabolic strategies.

Various metabolic activities are observed in Chromatiaceae:

=== Sulfur metabolism ===
Chromatiaceae bacteria carry out anoxygenic photosynthesis, during which they oxidize reduced sulfur compounds to sulfate (SO_{4}^{2-}). All the species are able to use elemental sulfur (S^{0}) and hydrogen sulfide (H_{2}S) as electron donors. As early as 1931, the stoichiometric link between photosynthetic CO_{2} fixation and sulfide oxidation was demonstrated: the overall reaction contains the reduction of 2 carbon dioxide molecules to 2 carbohydrates molecules coupled with the oxidation of 1 sulfide molecule to 1 sulfate molecule.

$\ce{2CO2 + H2S + 2H2O -> 2CH2O + H2SO4}$

Many species utilize thiosulfate (S_{2}O_{3}^{2-}) as electron donor, whereas only few of them oxidize sulfite (SO_{3}^{2-}) and tetrathionate (S_{4}O_{6}^{2-}). In the following example reaction, thiosulfate appears as sodium thiosulfate (Na_{2}S_{2}O_{3}) and is oxidized to sulfuric acid (H_{2}SO_{4}) and sodium sulfate (Na_{2}SO_{4}).

$\ce{2CO2 + Na2S2O3 + 3H2O -> 2CH2O + H2SO4 + Na2SO4}$

The final goal of those enzymatic reactions is the oxidation to sulfate. Meanwhile, metabolic intermediates can be formed as sulfur and sulfite. Sulfur is stored as granules inside the cells and can be used as an electron reserve in dark growth conditions during respiration and fermentation. Conversely, sulfite does not accumulate intracellularly since it is readily oxidized to sulfate.

=== Nitrogen metabolism ===
Most of the species can perform biological nitrogen fixation, during which atmospheric nitrogen or dinitrogen (N_{2}) is converted into ammonia by a nitrogenase.

$\ce{N2 + 16ATP + 16H2O + 8e- + 8H+ -> 2NH3 + H2 + 16ADP + 16Pi}$

The favorite nitrogen source of all Chromatiaceae is ammonia; as in many other bacteria, its assimilation is catalyzed by the enzymes GS (glutamine synthetase) and GOGAT (glutamine oxoglutarate aminotransferase), which incorporate the inorganic ammonia into amino acids. Regarding the organic nitrogen sources used by these bacteria, glutamate and aspartate are among the most common.

=== Hydrogen metabolism ===
Hydrogen (H_{2}) is a major electron donor for photoautotrophic Chromatiaceae. It can be obtained in different ways, according to the growth conditions:

- the membrane-bound enzyme hydrogenase can recycle the hydrogen produced by the enzyme nitrogenase during the biological nitrogen fixation;
- it can be photoproduced through the process of photosynthesis;
- it can be produced together with CO_{2} via the complete degradation of a number of organic carbon compounds (i.e. lactate and acetate) using dinitrogen, glutamate or aspartate as nitrogen source; H_{2} and CO_{2} thus obtained can be then used as substrates for photosynthesis.

=== Carbon metabolism ===
The majority of Chromatiaceae species utilize CO_{2} as the sole carbon source for autotrophic growth. They employ the Calvin cycle with the key enzymes ribulose bisphosphate carboxylase (RubisCO) and phosphoribulokinase. Versatile species are able to metabolize a larger number of organic compounds than specialized species, which instead mainly assimilate acetate and pyruvate.

=== Oxygenic metabolism ===
As mentioned above, although Chromatiaceae largely practice anoxygenic photosynthesis, there are also versatile species able to switch their metabolism in the presence of oxygen.

== Ecology and distribution ==
As in the case of the other purple sulfur bacteria, Chromatiaceae are mainly found in all those anaerobic habitats where the presence of light and the geochemical or biological production of sulfide can support their growth. These types of habitats occur especially in the anoxic sediments of both fresh and sea water, salt marshes, saline and soda lakes, sulfur springs and in stratified environments such as microbial mats and meromictic lakes.

The natural distribution of Chromatiaceae strongly depends on the selective environmental factors described above (anoxic conditions, availability of light and sulfide) and follows daily and seasonal fluctuations, especially in response to the changes in sunlight intensity and temperature. Sulfide concentration tends to fall during the day and rise during the night, this is due to the fact that oxygen production by algae and Cyanobacteria and sulfide oxidation by phototrophic bacteria are diurnal activities; conversely, sulfide production by sulfate reducers and oxygen utilization by respiratory bacteria occur overnight since they are light-independent reactions.

Light absorption changes also according to the type of habitat: the photic zone in sediments is less extensive compared to that in the water, in fact, while in the latter the penetration depth of light is many meters, sediment particles strongly reduce the amount of light entering, and this is the reason why phototrophic bacteria in sediments often form thinner layers within the uppermost millimeters. Sulfate present in the sediments is metabolised to sulfide by sulfate-reducing bacteria and the sulfide thus produced diffuses upwards into the water column. Then, sulfide forms a vertical gradient with an opposite trend to that of the light, which on the contrary decreases going downwards. This is the reason why these bacteria can find their optimal growth conditions in small areas of overlap between the countercurrent gradients of the above-mentioned factors.

The bacteria inhabiting meromictic lakes generally grow at a quite fixed depth and in a relatively stable way over time, as in these lakes there is a permanent stratification due to the higher salinity of the bottom water layers; in particular, photosynthetic purple sulfur bacteria are located at the level of the chemocline, where they can benefit from both the sunlight from above and the sulfide produced by the underlying anaerobic bacteria. Since the chemocline is usually relatively deep (from a few centimeters up to several meters, depending on the lake), the blooms of these bacteria tend not to be visible at the water surface. Regarding the holomictic lakes, here occurs a seasonal, thermal stratification maintained by temperature differences (especially during summer), which also provides a stable enough layering for purple sulfur bacteria growth; in this case, they cluster at the level of the anoxic and sulfidic hypolimnion, that is to say the dense, bottom water layer of the lake.

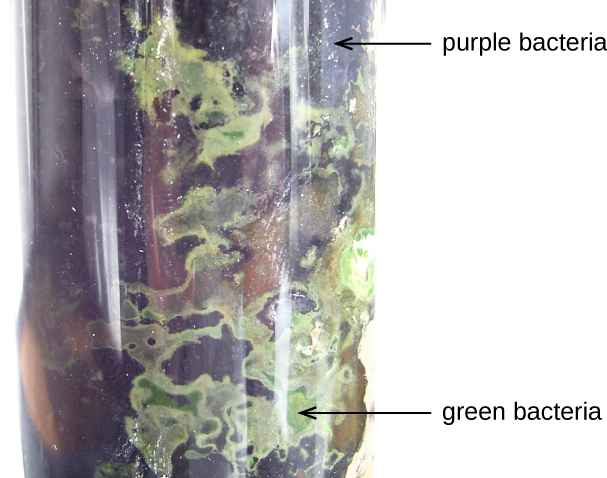
Purple and green sulfur bacteria in a Winogradsky column

Ectothiorhodospiraceae and Chlorobiaceae are the only other families of phototrophic bacteria which thrive under similar environmental conditions: despite their dissimilarities from a genetic and evolutionary point of view, both purple and green sulfur bacteria depend on reduced inorganic sulfur compounds for their growth and it allows them to play similar ecological roles. The metabolic flexibility of the versatile species belonging to the Chromatiaceae family provides a better adaptation to the environmental changes, such as those occurring in the intermittently oxygenated areas; anyway, the growth they obtain through photosynthesis is greater than that obtained through any other metabolic strategy, regardless of the fact that using forms of metabolism different from photosynthesis means having to compete with those nonphototrophic bacteria and facultative chemotrophic purple nonsulfur bacteria which share the same habitat.

Generally, in the multi-layering of a microbial mat, the green sulfur bacteria are placed immediately underneath layers of phototrophic purple sulfur bacteria (and of algae and Cyanobacteria); this coexistence is strategic for several reasons, just to name a few:

- the green sulfur bacteria are typically much more sulfide tolerant than the purple sulfur bacteria;
- the green sulfur bacteria require lower light intensities than the purple sulfur bacteria and they also absorb different light wavelengths;
- since they are physically covered by one or more layers of purple sulfur bacteria, the green sulfur bacteria are protected from oxygen, as they are obligate anaerobes; in return, the green sulfur bacteria supply extracellular elemental sulfur to the purple sulfur bacteria. This is a full-fledged form of syntrophy which has been observed among several species, for example Chromatium vinosum and Chlorobium limicola.

== Applications ==
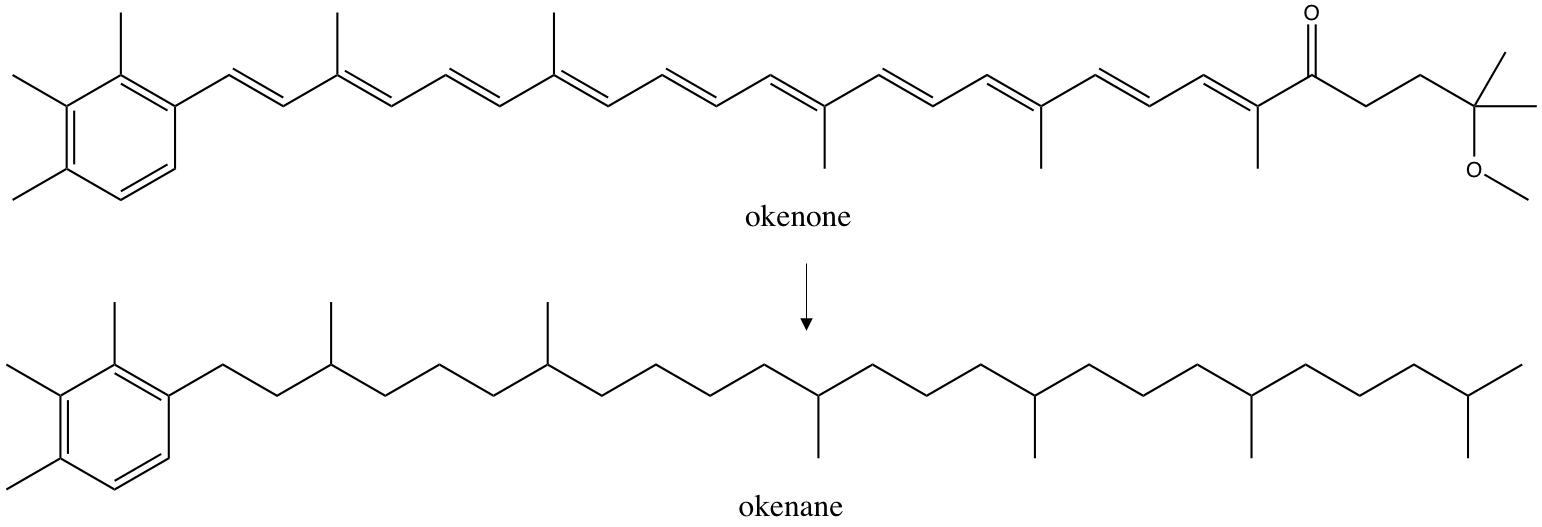
The pigment molecule okenone is diagenetically altered and preserved as the partially saturated okenane.

=== Use as biomarkers ===
The diagenetic end product of okenone, okenane, is considered a valid biomarker. When bacteria die, they sink to the seafloor together with some of their pigment molecules, including okenone. Under conditions of preservation, the environment is often anoxic and reducing, leading to the chemical loss of functional groups and the partial saturation of okenone to okenane, which in this form can evade microbial and chemical degradation and therefore is buried in marine sediments. This molecule allows to carry out paleoenvironmental reconstructions, since its discovery in marine sediments implies the presence of purple sulfur bacteria during the time of burial and thus a past euxinic environment (that is to say, anoxic and sulfidic waters).

=== Use as bioremediators ===
An anaerobic lagoon is a shallow, man-made, covered basin designed to hold and pretreat industrial, urban or other kinds of wastewaters. Here Chromatiaceae (and purple sulfur bacteria in general) are the predominant phototrophic bacteria, since they play a key role in metabolizing and thus lowering the concentration of undesirable compounds present in the influent wastewater stream. This is an example of in situ bioremediation, during which the bacteria inhabiting the lagoon exploit these compounds to support their photoheterotrophic growth. For example, they can use the toxic and bad-smelling hydrogen sulfide as the electron source and the greenhouse gas methane as the carbon source for anoxygenic photosynthesis; in this way, the contaminants are removed from the lagoon thus reducing odour and toxicity as well as atmospheric pollution, respectively.
