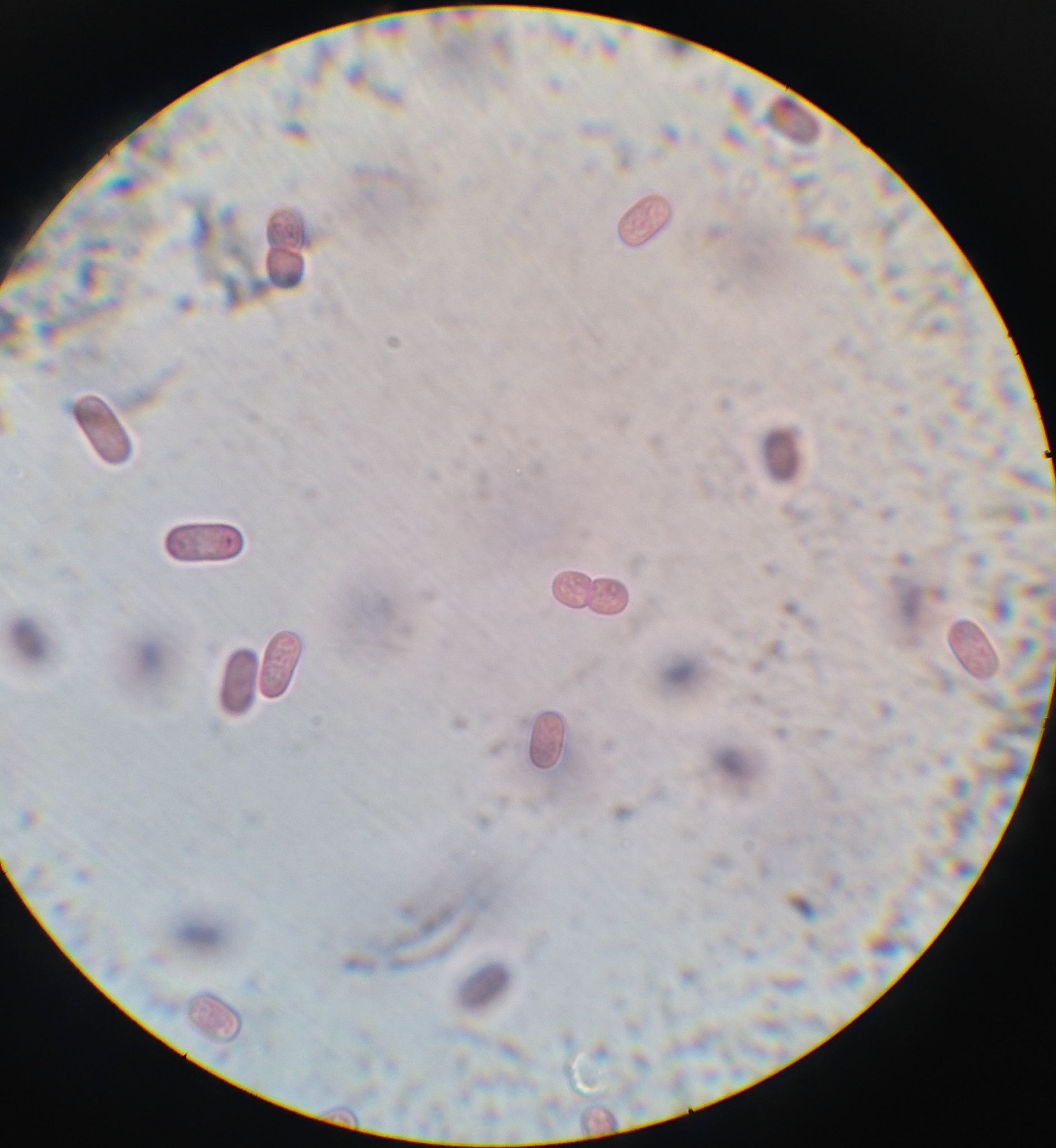
- Chromatium okenii in the microscope at 600x magnification.

Scientific classification
- Domain: Bacteria
- Kingdom: Pseudomonadati
- Phylum: Pseudomonadota
- Class: Gammaproteobacteria
- Order: Chromatiales; Imhoff 2005

Type genus
- Chromatium Perty 1852 (Approved Lists 1980)

Families
- Chromatiaceae Bavendamm 1924 (Approved Lists 1980); Acidihalobacteraceae Chuvochina et al. 2024; Aquisalimonadaceae Chuvochina et al. 2024; Ectothiorhodospiraceae Imhoff 1984; Granulosicoccaceae Lee et al. 2008; Halofilaceae Chuvochina et al. 2024; Halorhodospiraceae Imhoff et al. 2023; Halothiobacillaceae Kelly and Wood 2005; Methylohalomonadaceae Sorokin and Merkel 2023; Natronospiraceae Sorokin et al. 2025; Nitrococcaceae Chuvochina et al. 2024; Nitrosococcaceae Chuvochina et al. 2024; Oceanococcaceae Chuvochina et al. 2024; "Ca. Poriferisulfidaceae" Chuvochina et al. 2023; Sedimenticolaceae Slobodkina et al. 2024; "Ca. Tenderiaceae" Chuvochina et al. 2023; Thioalkalibacteraceae Boden 2017; Thioalkalispiraceae Mori et al. 2011; Thioalkalivibrionaceae Chuvochina et al. 2024; Thiocapsaceae Bavendamm 1924 (Approved Lists 1980); Thiohalomonadaceae Sorokin and Merkel 2023; Thiohalophilaceae Sorokin and Merkel 2023; Thiohalospiraceae Sorokin and Merkel 2023; Thioprofundaceae Kojima et al. 2017; Wenzhouxiangellaceae Wang et al. 2015; Woeseiaceae Du et al. 2016; "Aquichromatiaceae" Yang et al. 2017

Synonyms
- Ectothiorhodospirales Chuvochina et al. 2024; Granulosicoccales Chuvochina et al. 2024; Halothiobacillales Chuvochina et al. 2024; Nitrococcales Chuvochina et al. 2024; Methylohalomonadales Sorokin and Merkel 2023; Natronospirales Sorokin et al. 2025; Nitrosococcales Chuvochina et al. 2024; Thiohalomonadales Sorokin and Merkel 2023; Thiohalospirales Sorokin and Merkel 2023; Woeseiales Chuvochina et al. 2024 "Ca. Tenderiales" Chuvochina et al. 2023

= Chromatiales =

Order of bacteria

The Chromatiales are an order of Gammaproteobacteria within Pseudomonadota. Like other Proteobacteria, the Chromatiales are Gram-negative and can be spherical, vibrioid, spiral or rod-shaped.

== Classification ==
Some members of the order comprise the primarily anaerobic and phototrophic purple sulfur bacteria (PSBs), found specifically within the families Chromatiaceae and Ectothiorhodospiraceae. Other members, like those in the families Halothiobacillaceae and Thioalkalibacteraceae, are aerobic and chemolithoautotrophic.
