= Deinococcus frigens =

Scientific classification
- Domain: Bacteria
- Kingdom: Thermotogati
- Phylum: Deinococcota
- Class: Deinococci
- Order: Deinococcales
- Family: Deinococcaceae
- Genus: Deinococcus
- Species: D. frigens

Binomial name
- Deinococcus frigens Hirsch et al. 2006

Species of bacterium

Deinococcus frigens is a species of low temperature and drought-tolerating, UV-resistant bacteria from Antarctica. It is Gram-positive, non-motile and coccoid-shaped. It is a AA-692 type strain. Individual Deinococcus frigens range in size from 0.9-2.0 μm. The bacterial colonies appears orange or pink in color. Liquid-grown cells viewed using a phase-contrast light microscope or transmission electron microscope on agar-coated slides show that isolated D. frigens appear to produce buds. Comparison of the genomes of Deiococcus radiodurans and D. frigens have predicted that no flagellar assembly exists in D. frigens.

== Discovery ==
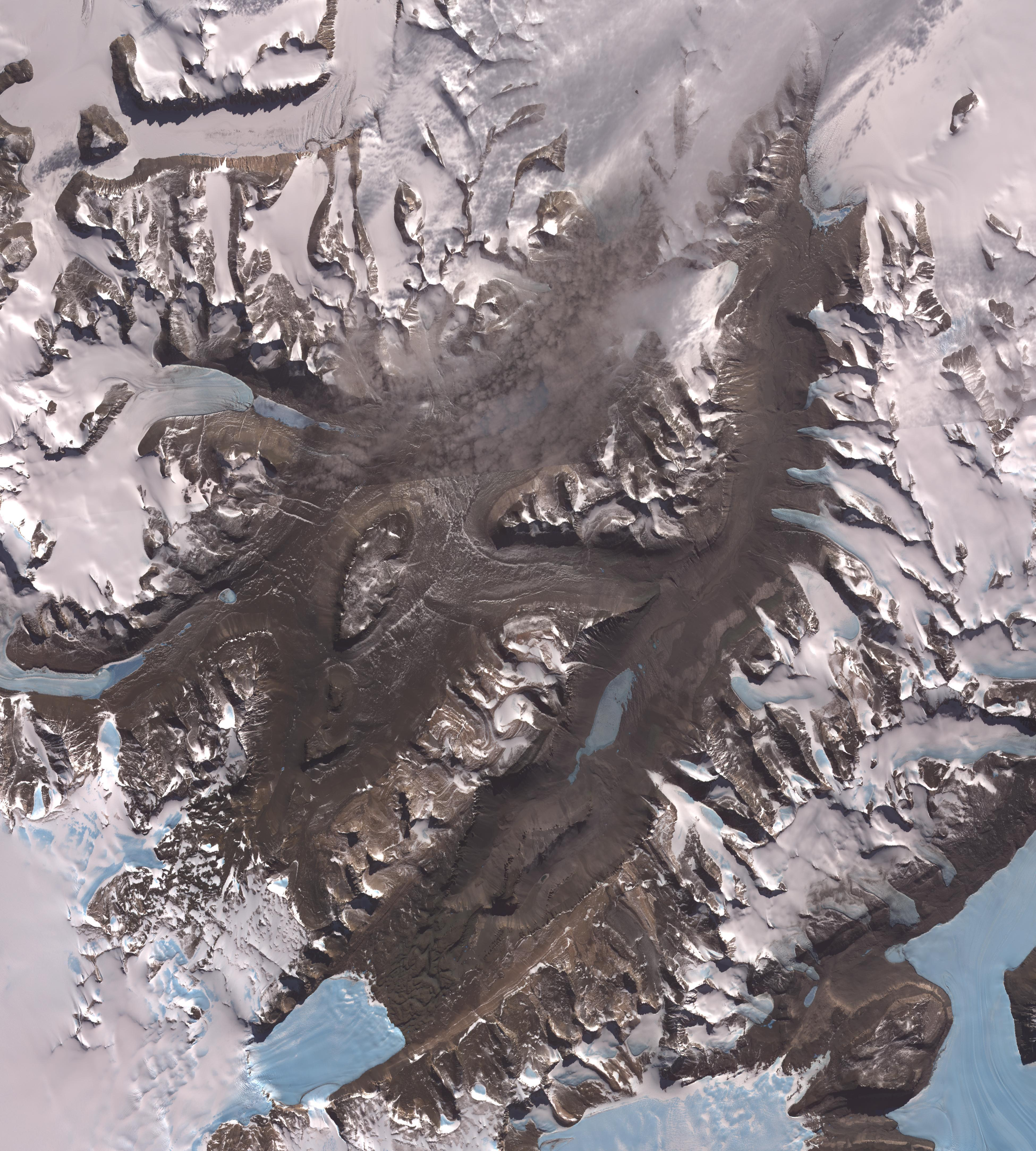
Dry Valleys, Antarctica

Deinococcus frigens was discovered in 2004 by Peter Hirsch, a researcher at the Institute for General Microbiology of the Christian-Albrechts-University Kiel, in soil samples gathered from the ice-free McMurdo Dry Valleys of Continental Antarctica. Whether D. frigens can be found in other areas of the Antarctic is currently unknown. The soil sample containing D. frigens was collected from the top 0–4 cm of soil at pH 6.3. To enrich for certain bacteria, the soil sample was added to PYGV medium and incubated at 9 °C and pH 8.0. PYGV is a media containing peptone, yeast, and glucose at low concentrations, first used to culture freshwater bacteria that could survive oligotrophic conditions, or low amounts of nutrients. To isolate and cultivate these bacteria, enrichment samples taken at various time intervals were streaked on PYGV plates, where individual colonies could be subcultured onto PYGV slants.

== Taxonomy ==
Deinococcus frigens is an extremophilic, gram-positive cocci bacterium. The genus Deinococcus is generally known for its resistance to very large doses of radiation, and the species D. frigens is no exception. The species designation “frigens” refers to the harsh, cold climate of Antarctica where this microbe is found.

DNA sequences from six isolates found in the McMurdo Valley were determined by extraction of the genomic DNA, PCR amplification of the 16S rDNA, and analysis of the PCR product sequences. High molecular DNA was obtained and purified by using Marmur's technique of lysing the cells, centrifuging the cell debris off, denaturing proteins, removing RNA with RNase, and precipitating the DNA with isopropanol. The 16S rDNA sequences amplified from PCR were then aligned with the sequences of previously identified bacterial lines of descent. Using sequence databases, these six isolates were shown to all be related to the Deinococcus lineage; however, they form three coherent clusters, separate from other Deinococcus species. DNA-DNA similarity data, obtained using the DNA hybridization technique, shows that these three clusters represented three new species of Deinococcus, and were given the names D. frigens, Deinococcus saxicola and Deinococcus marmoris. Using 16s rRNA sequencing as a basis of comparison, D. frigens has been found to have a 97.3% similarity with D. saxicola and a 96.6% similarity to D. marmoris. The closest relative to these three more recently discovered species is Deinococcus radiopugnans, which has a genome with a 96.1% similarity. The full scientific classification of this species is Kingdom Bacteria, Phylum Deinococcota, Class Deinococci, Order Deinococcales, Family Deinococcaceae, Genus Deinococcus, Species D. frigens.

=== Genome ===
The full genome of D. frigens was sequenced by the DOE Joint Genome institute using the sequencing technology Illumina HiSeq 2000. The genome was then annotated using the standard procedures of the DOE-JGI Microbial Genome Annotation Pipeline by quality control pre-processing, structural annotation, and functional annotation. The assembly method was vpAllpaths v.r46652, and the gene calling method used was Prodigal 2.5. This information was collected and entered into the Joint Genome Institute's database by Dr. Nikos Kyrpides and Dr. Tanja Woyke.

The genome of D. frigens is made up of 2,015,889 base pairs of DNA with a GC-content of 65.5%. Of the 4057 genes found in D. frigens, 3987 are protein-coding. The JGI IMG database shows genes which are found within D. frigens and associated with metabolic pathways found in the KEGG database. For carbohydrate metabolism, the genome of D. frigens contains genes necessary for metabolism of fructose to glucose, galactose to glucose, the entirety of the glycolysis pathway, pyruvate metabolism, TCA cycle, gluconeogenesis, the pentose phosphate pathway. Additionally, the genome includes genes necessary for extracellular nitrate and nitrite transport, assimilatory reduction of nitrite to ammonia, assimilatory reduction of nitrate to nitrite, and sulfite reduction. The electron transport chain of D. frigens is made up of five complexes: NADH dehydrogenase, succinate dehydrogenase, cytochrome bc1 complex, cytochrome c oxidase, and ATP synthase. Unlike its close relative, Deinococcus radiodurans, D. frigens has no flagellar assembly for movement.

== Growth conditions ==
Deinococcus species such as these are well known for being some of the most resilient bacteria discovered on Earth. Deinococcus frigens is in many ways similar to other microbes of the genus Deinococcus, but with several adaptations that allow it to live in the extreme environment of the Antarctic- an area characterized by heavy, incessant winds, droughts, and severely cold winters. D. frigens is aerobic to facultatively anaerobic allowing it to survive in topsoil, and it is able to hydrolyze glucose, acetate, and casein for use as carbon sources. Additionally, this species grows at low temperatures (psychrophile organism), ranging from 1-21 °C, which was determined by placing test tubes containing isolates into an aluminum block that produced a range of temperatures from 0-40 °C. D. frigens can tolerate growth in up to 10% NaCl and can grow in pH ranging from 3.8-8.7. To determine ideal NaCl concentration and pH levels for growth, isolated samples were placed into several PYGV plates where various amounts of NaCl, ranging from 1-20% weight by volume, and 0.05 g*1^{−1} phosphate buffer were added respectively. D. frigens is also resistant to UV radiation. By placing samples of D. frigens at various distances, 8–12 cm, from a 254 nm UV lamp, the bacterial growth under UV conditions could then be measured over 4-20 minute time periods.

== Relevance ==
These extremo-tolerant characteristics make D. frigens a candidate for further study in areas as diverse as cancer, aging, and microbiology in space. Because of their hardy nature and extreme characteristics, Deinococcus species are often used as model organisms for oncological and aging studies. Their ability to combat oxidative stress and the formation of carcinogenic reactive oxygen species may be the vital key in future endeavors for anti aging research and anticancer treatments. The psychrophilic, or thriving in cold temperatures, nature of D. frigens is also of interest to humanity. Psychrophiles’ ability to survive in extremely cold environments may potentially be studied by astrophysicists trying to unlock the key to exploring frozen environments within the Solar System. Indeed, the field of "astrobiology” seeks to explore life within the upper atmosphere of Earth. Psychrophiles in the atmosphere have been found living at the very interface between water and ice, and new species, such as Colwellia psychrerythraea have been discovered as a result of this research. Psychrophilic bacteria have also been shown to contain unique lipids and membrane structures which help add stability to the membrane of the cells. In general, microorganisms from the Antarctic are used as model organisms for studying methods and tools of adaptation to extremely cold temperatures.
