= List of microorganisms tested in outer space =

The survival of some microorganisms exposed to outer space has been studied using both simulated facilities and low Earth orbit exposures. Bacteria were some of the first organisms investigated, when in 1960 a Russian satellite carried Escherichia coli, Staphylococcus, and Enterobacter aerogenes into orbit. Many kinds of microorganisms have been selected for exposure experiments since, as listed in the table below.

Experiments of the adaption of microbes in space have yielded unpredictable results. While sometimes the microorganism may weaken, they can also increase in their disease-causing potency.

It is possible to classify these microorganisms into two groups, the human-borne and the extremophiles. Studying the human-borne microorganisms is significant for human welfare and future crewed missions in space, whilst the extremophiles are vital for studying the physiological requirements of survival in space. NASA has pointed out that normal adults have ten times as many microbial cells as human cells in their bodies. They are also nearly everywhere in the environment and, although normally invisible, can form slimy biofilms.

Extremophiles have adapted to live in some of the most extreme environments on Earth. This includes hypersaline lakes, arid regions, deep sea, acidic sites, cold and dry polar regions and permafrost. The existence of extremophiles has led to the speculation that microorganisms could survive the harsh conditions of extraterrestrial environments and be used as model organisms to understand the fate of biological systems in these environments. The focus of many experiments has been to investigate the possible survival of organisms inside rocks (lithopanspermia), or their survival on Mars for understanding the likelihood of past or present life on that planet. Because of their ubiquity and resistance to spacecraft decontamination, bacterial spores are considered likely potential forward contaminants on robotic missions to Mars. Measuring the resistance of such organisms to space conditions can be applied to develop adequate decontamination procedures.

Research and testing of microorganisms in outer space could eventually be applied for directed panspermia or terraforming.

== Table ==
indicates testing conditions

Organism	Low Earth orbit	Impact event and planetary ejection	Atmospheric reentry	Simulated conditions	References
Bacteria & bacterial spores					
Actinomyces erythreus				Checked	
Aeromonas proteolytica	Checked				
Anabaena cylindrica (akinetes)	Checked			Checked	
Azotobacter chroococcum				Checked	
Azotobacter vinelandii				Checked	
Bacillus cereus				Checked	
Bacillus megaterium				Checked	
Bacillus mycoides				Checked	
Bacillus pumilus				Checked	
Bacillus subtilis	Checked	Checked	Checked	Checked	
Bacillus thuringiensis	Checked				
Carnobacterium				Checked	
Chroococcidiopsis	Checked	Checked	Checked	Checked	
Clostridium botulinum				Checked	
Clostridium butyricum				Checked	
Clostridium celatum				Checked	
Clostridium mangenotii				Checked	
Clostridium roseum				Checked	
Deinococcus aerius	Checked				
Deinococcus aetherius	Checked				
Deinococcus geothermalis	Checked			Checked	
Deinococcus radiodurans	Checked	Checked		Checked	
Enterobacter aerogenes				Checked	
Escherichia coli	Checked	Checked		Checked	
Gloeocapsa	Checked				
Gloeocapsopsis pleurocapsoides				Checked	
Haloarcula-G	Checked				
Hydrogenomonas eutropha	Checked				
Klebsiella pneumoniae				Checked	
Kocuria rosea				Checked	
Lactobacillus plantarum				Checked	
Leptolyngbya				Checked	
Luteococcus japonicus				Checked	
Micrococcus luteus	Checked				
Nostoc commune	Checked			Checked	
Nostoc microscopicum				Checked	
Photobacterium				Checked	
Pseudomonas aeruginosa	Checked			Checked	
Pseudomonas fluorescens				Checked	
Rhodococcus erythropolis	Checked				
Rhodospirillum rubrum				Checked	
Salmonella enterica				Checked	
Serratia marcescens				Checked	
Serratia plymuthica		Checked			
Staphylococcus aureus				Checked	
Streptococcus mutans				Checked	
Streptomyces albus				Checked	
Streptomyces coelicolor				Checked	
Synechococcus (halite)	Checked				
Synechocystis	Checked			Checked	
Symploca				Checked	
Tolypothrix byssoidea				Checked	
Archaea	Low Earth orbit	Impact event and planetary ejection	Atmospheric reentry	Simulated conditions	
Halobacterium noricense				Checked	
Halobacterium salinarum				Checked	
Halococcus dombrowskii				Checked	
Halorubrum chaoviatoris	Checked				
Methanosarcina sp. SA-21/16				Checked	
Methanobacterium MC-20				Checked	
Methanosarcina barkeri				Checked	
Fungi and algae	Low Earth orbit	Impact event and planetary ejection	Atmospheric reentry	Simulated conditions	
Aspergillus niger				Checked	
Aspergillus oryzae	Checked			Checked	
Aspergillus terreus				Checked	
Aspergillus versicolor	Checked				
Chaetomium globosum	Checked			Checked	
Cladosporium herbarum				Checked	
Cryomyces antarcticus	Checked			Checked	
Cryomyces minteri	Checked			Checked	
Euglena gracilis	Checked			Checked	
Mucor plumbeus				Checked	
Nannochloropsis oculata		Checked			
Penicillium roqueforti	Checked				
Rhodotorula mucilaginosa				Checked	
Sordaria fimicola	Checked				
Trebouxia				Checked	
Trichoderma koningii	Checked				
Trichoderma longibrachiatum	Checked				
Trichophyton terrestre	Checked				
Ulocladium atrum			Checked		
Lichens	Low Earth orbit	Impact event and planetary ejection	Atmospheric reentry	Simulated conditions	
Aspicilia fruticulosa	Checked			Checked	
Buellia frigida				Checked	
Circinaria gyrosa	Checked			Checked	
Diploschistes muscorum				Checked	
Rhizocarpon geographicum	Checked			Checked	
Rosenvingiella	Checked				
Xanthoria elegans	Checked	Checked		Checked	
Xanthoria parietina	Checked			Checked	
Bacteriophage / virus	Low Earth orbit	Impact event and planetary ejection	Atmospheric reentry	Simulated conditions	
T7 phage				Checked	
Canine hepatitis	Checked				
Influenza PR8	Checked				
Tobacco mosaic virus	Checked				
Vaccinia virus	Checked				
Yeast	Low Earth orbit	Impact event and planetary ejection	Atmospheric reentry	Simulated conditions	
Rhodotorula rubra	Checked			Checked	
Saccharomyces cerevisiae	Checked			Checked	
Saccharomyces ellipsoides	Checked				
Zygosaccharomyces bailii	Checked				
Animals	Low Earth orbit	Impact event and planetary ejection	Atmospheric reentry	Simulated conditions	
Caenorhabditis elegans (nematode)	Checked				
Hypsibius dujardini (tardigrade)		Checked		Checked	
Milnesium tardigradum (tardigrade)	Checked				
Richtersius coronifer (tardigrade)	Checked			Checked	
Mniobia russeola (rotifer)				Checked	

== See also ==
Misc

- Animals in space
- Astrobiology
- Earliest known life forms
- Extremophiles
- Health threat from cosmic rays
- Interplanetary contamination
- Microscopic life
- Panspermia and directed panspermia
- Plants in space
- Space research

Low Earth orbit missions

- Bion
- BIOPAN
- Biosatellite program
- EXPOSE
- O/OREOS
- Tanpopo
