= Deinococcus marmoris =

Scientific classification
- Domain: Bacteria
- Kingdom: Thermotogati
- Phylum: Deinococcota
- Class: Deinococci
- Order: Deinococcales
- Family: Deinococcaceae
- Genus: Deinococcus
- Species: D. marmoris

Binomial name
- Deinococcus marmoris Hirsch 2004

Species of bacterium

Deinococcus marmoris is a Gram-positive bacterium isolated from Antarctica. As a species of the genus Deinococcus, the bacterium is UV-tolerant and able to withstand low temperatures.

== Isolation ==
Deinococcus marmoris type strain AA-63^{T} (DSM 12784^{T}) was isolated from a marble sample in Antarctica by Peter Hirsch and colleagues in 2004, and the specific strain PAMC 26562 was isolated in the King George Island in Antarctica from a sample of lichen species called Ursnea. The isolates from antarctic marble were isolated in PGYV broth, a mineral salt solution containing peptone, glucose, yeast, and vitamin solution, at neutral pH and incubated at a range of 9 to 18 degrees Celsius.

== Taxonomy ==
Deinococcus marmoris is a part of the domain Bacteria, phylum Deinococcota, class Deinococci, order Deinococcales, family Deinococcaceae, and genus Deinococcus. This bacterium was isolated along with six other related species, among which are its closest relatives, D. frigens and D. saxicola. The bacterium is in close phylogenetic proximity to Deinococcus radiodurans, which has become well understood in terms of its metabolic functions and radiation tolerance. D. marmoris is also related to thermophiles from the genera Thermus and Meiothermus. The phylogenetic relationships were determined using 16S ribosomal RNA analyses.

== Ecology ==
With respect to the ecology of the genus Deinococcus most of the species are able to live under increased levels of radiation and desiccation. Deinococcus have also shown the ability to precipitate heavy metals and toxins from nuclear waste in order to make removal easier. Most of the species are able to live under increased levels of radiation and desiccation. Deinococcus have also shown the ability to precipitate heavy metals and toxins from nuclear waste in order to make removal easier. It is known that the growth optimum of Deinococcus marmoris is psychrophilic at 15 degrees Celsius, and it is also known that the organism was isolated from a marble slab. Currently, the only known location of Deinococcus marmoris is in Antarctica where it was originally sampled.

== Genomics ==
The complete genome of Deinococcus marmoris [DSM 12784^{T}] has been sequenced using Illumina Hiseq 2000 and Illumina Hiseq 2500, which are techniques that fragment the DNA of interest and record fluorescence with each individual base of the fragment. This type of sequencing technique gathers small fragments of overlapping DNA sequences called contigs. The contigs gathered from Illumina were then delivered to the DOE Joint Genome Institute (JGI), where the whole genome sequence was recorded and published. Nikos Kyrpides added the genome assembly on March 1, 2012, using an assembly method through JGI Gold Analysis Project, though it was modified on August 5, 2014. The Deinococcus marmoris genome was found to contain 4,800,021 base pairs and a G+C content of 64.4 percent. Of the total sequence, 4,145,112 of the base pairs code for DNA. There are 4,688 total genes and 4,620 protein coding genes. In addition, the genome contains 68 RNA genes and 252 scaffolds. The genome includes genes for restriction endonuclease activity as well as a plasmid. Among the 1,046 protein-coding genes associated with KEGG pathways, Deinococcus marmoris contains genes involved in the citric acid cycle such as pyruvate dehydrogenase, phosphoenolpyruvate carboxykinase, pyruvate kinase, and citrate synthase. The D. marmoris genome also contains genes necessary for the glycolysis and gluconeogenesis pathways, including glucokinase, phosphoglucomutase, phosphofructokinase, and enolase. D. marmoris is able to utilize the pentose phosphate pathway with genes that encode enzymes such as ribokinase, phosphopentomutase, and ribose-5-phosphate isomerase. In its oxidative phosphorylation pathway, the organism uses a multi-subunit NADH-quinone oxidoreductase, genes encoding succinate dehydrogenase and fumarate reductase subunits, genes encoding cytochrome c oxidase subunits, and a V/A-type H+ ATPase enzyme. It has been found that the organism is auxotrophic for synthesis of amino acids such as L-lysine, L-phenylalanine, L-tyrosine, L-tryptophan, L-histidine, L-cysteine, L-leucine, L-isoleucine, L-valine, and L-serine. The organism is able to synthesize (and thus is prototrophic for the synthesis of) the following amino acids: L-alanine, L-glutamate, L-asparagine, L-glycine, and L-glutamine.

== Physiological characterization ==
Deinococcus marmoris is a Gram-positive, non-motile bacterium that is UV-tolerant and grows in aerobic conditions. The bacterium is coccus, or circle shaped, and its colony color ranges from pink to orange. It grows best in oligotrophic conditions, with high oxygen concentration and few nutrients from plant inhabitants.

=== Growth media ===
Researchers have found that D. marmoris grows best with little salt concentration and at low temperatures; it was cultured using a PYGV agar, which is composed of 20 mL of mineral salt solution along with yeast extract, peptone, and distilled water. Due to the organism's psychrophilicity, researchers used a temperature of 15 °C for optimal growth conditions, and the optimal pH for growth of D. marmoris is neutral at 7.5.

=== Metabolism ===
The metabolism of Deinococcus marmoris has not been researched extensively therefore must be inferred from known relatives in the same genus. The main carbon source for Deinococcus radiodurans is fructose which undergoes several catabolic reactions to eventually the TCA cycle and produces the molecules NADH and FADH for its electron transport chain and the eventual production of ATP. A byproduct of the production of ATP is O_{2} which can be either endogenously or exogenously induced to create a reactive oxidative species (ROS). The induction of O_{2} into a ROS is by gamma irradiation which can be reduced with an abundance of Mn(II) inside the cell as the reduced form of Mn(IV). Mn(II) is able to reduce the amount of ROS in Deinococcus radiodurans because it acts as an antioxidant and assists other enzymatic reactions that reduce the total amount of ROS allowing the organism to survive in environments of high exposure to radiation. The metabolism of Deinococcus marmoris at this point in time is limited to the research that has been completed; however, what is currently known is that as part of the Deinococcus taxa the species must be radioactively resistant with similar mechanisms to reduce the amount of ROS inside the cell.

== Scientific importance ==
The genus Deinococcus is renowned for being the most radioactive resistant bacteria. They have the ability to absorb ionizing and UV radiation and withstand damage from a range of sources, which can include desiccation and oxidative stress. These characteristics and the ability to resist harsh environments has proved to be useful to researchers. Deinococcus has been applied to the task of cleaning and removing nuclear waste. They have shown the ability to precipitate heavy metals and toxins from nuclear waste in order to make removal easier. According to an experiment from Appukuttan et al. published in 2006, a Deinococcus species was introduced to a 0.8 mM uranyl nitrate solution. After 6 hours, 90% of the uranium was bioprecipitated out of the solution. According to this study, this will provide an efficient and eco-friendly solution to nuclear cleanup and waste removal. Due to continued research and genomic sequencing of Deinococcus, its ability to be used as a model organism instead of Escherichia coli and Saccharomyces cerevisiae. This allows for researchers to have another diverse organism to experiment with.

=== Genomic relevance ===
When measuring the G+C content Junghee Kim and colleagues concluded that it was 64.1% which is high for an organism. This raises the question though as to why if Deinococcus marmoris has a high G+C content that its growth optima is at 15 degrees Celsius? This could be useful for studying the other purposes of the G+C content or what factors could be leading to Deinococcus marmoris not being able to survive higher temperatures as its growth optima as its G+C content would suggest. Other reasons why we should pay particular attention to Deinococcus marmoris is because it has a similar sequence size to Escherichia coli. This can be particularly useful because it opens the opportunity of Deinococcus marmoris to becoming a model organism for environmental conditions that call for low temperatures and high radiation. The sole reason that it could be considered for use as a model organism is based on the fact of its small genome size like that of E. coli, however, more research must be done on its sequence to fully understand the organism before manipulating its genome.
