= Deinococcus ficus =

Scientific classification
- Domain: Bacteria
- Kingdom: Thermotogati
- Phylum: Deinococcota
- Class: Deinococci
- Order: Deinococcales
- Family: Deinococcaceae
- Genus: Deinococcus
- Species: D. ficus

Binomial name
- Deinococcus ficus Shashidhar and Bandekar 2005, emend.

Species of bacterium

Deinococcus ficus strain CC-FR2-10^{T} is a gram-positive bacteria which plays a role in the production of nitrogen fertilizer. It was originally isolated from a Ficus plant, hence its name.

== Discovery ==
Deinococcus ficus was isolated in 2006 by Wei-An Lai, Peter Kämpfer, A. B. Arun, Fo-Ting Shen, Birgit Huber, P. D. Rekha1, and Chiu-Chung Young while the scientists were in the process of searching for certain rhizobacteria possessing the unique ability to aid in the vegetative growth of plants. D. ficus was given the species name ficus after it was isolated from the rhizosphere of the Ficus religiosa. After its discovery, various aspects such as its 16S rRNA gene sequence, respiratory quinones, structural polar lipids, and metabolic processes were tested through culturing on nutrient agar for two days at a temperature of 30 degrees Celsius. During this process, Deinococcus ficus was catalogued as strain CC-FR2-10^{T}. Although Deinococcus ficus has been proven useful in a variety of other functions, its role in the rhizosphere remains largely unknown.

== Phylogeny ==
The phylogenetic knowledge of Deinococcus ficus stems from its accidental discovery. After undergoing multiple rounds of phylogenetic analysis with 16S rRNA gene sequence, Deinococcus ficus CC-FR2-10^{T} was placed in the genus Deinococcus due to similarities in resistance of UV-light, gamma radiation, and desiccation. Deinococcus ficus has a number of close relatives including D. grandis with a 96.1% similar 16S rRNA gene sequence, D. radiodurans with a 94.3% similar 16S rRNA gene sequence, D. radiopugnans with a 93.2% similar 16S rRNA gene sequence, D. indicus with a 93.0% similar 16S rRNA gene sequence, D. proteolyticus with a 92.5% similar 16S rRNA gene sequence, D. murrayi with a 92.4% similar 16S rRNA gene sequence, and D. geothermal is with a 90.7% similar 16S rRNA gene sequence to that of D. ficus. As observed through high-performance liquid chromatography, D. ficus is further related to its fellow members of the genus Deinococcus through their mutual utilization of menaquinone (MK-8), a related compound of vitamin K2 found in fermented foods, as their major quinone.

== Characterization ==
Deinococcus ficus is a rod-shaped, non-motile, non-spore forming bacteria, proven after a three-day-long observation under a microscope in a semi-solid medium held at 30 degrees Celsius. After being flushed with 20% potassium hydroxide (KOH test), D. ficus was shown to exhibit pink pigmentation. Colonies of D. ficus were observed displaying translucent and shiny properties through testing on King's B agar, a fluorescence-detecting medium, for 48 hours. The specific pre-dominant polar lipid utilized by D. ficus is still unknown; however, through thin-layer chromatography, it is known to be a phosphoglycolipid, a Phosphate-containing fat molecule which plays a role in cell membrane structure.

== Physiology ==
Deinococcus ficus is known to grow in the rhizosphere of the F. religiosa plant, where it was discovered. D. ficus will grow on nutrient agar at 37 degrees Celsius, but it will not grow on nutrient agar in temperatures exceeding 42 degrees Celsius or falling below 5 degrees Celsius. Through the use of Degryse agar, a medium including 0.1 g of yeast extract per liter as well ammonium sulfate and filter sterilized carbon sources, it was discovered that D. ficus prefers growth under alkaline conditions but is able to tolerate a pH range of 5.5-10.

== Role in nitrogen fertilizer ==
Despite being a fairly newly discovered microorganism, various uses for D. ficus have already been identified. D. ficus can serve organic functions, such as being a valuable asset in the production of nitrogen fertilizer. Nitrogen fertilizer is advantageous due to the status of nitrogen as a crucial macronutrient, making it vital to proper plant growth due to its presence in chlorophyll as well as proteins and DNA. Therefore, photosynthesis cannot take place in the absence of nitrogen. In testing, exposure to ultraviolet light as well as translesion synthesis polymerase have resulted in certain mutations in D. ficus aided by the lexA-imuB-dnaE2 gene cassette, a cassette which codes for error-prone or lesion bypass polymerase activity. As shown by a detailed experiment involving liquid feather medium further explained on Zeng et al., these mutations increased the organism's potential to perform keratinase processes. Poultry feathers are a harbor for beneficial proteins and nutrients; however, they contain a relatively high keratin concentration, making the process of their degradation fairly challenging due to the presence of a large number of disulfide bonds as well as cross linkages (bonds connecting chains of polymers together). Therefore, the keratinase-inducing properties of mainly UV-light but also translesion synthesis polymerase serve particularly useful functions through their induced mutations in D. ficus which allow it to enhance its ability to breakdown poultry feathers, leading to an increased availability of beneficial nutrients and proteins which can aid in this fertilizer production.
