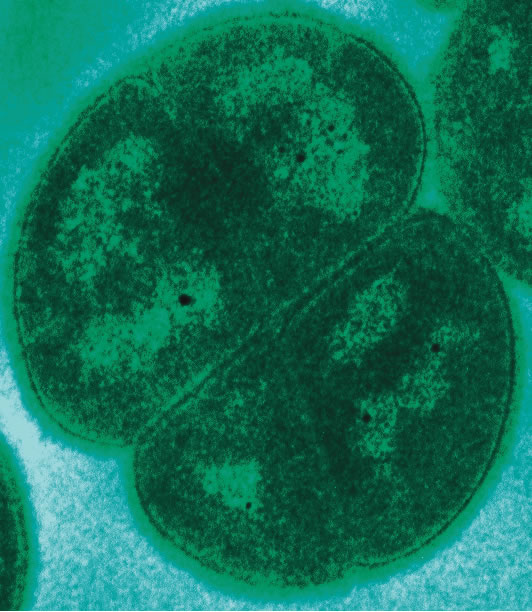
- A tetrad of D. radiodurans

Scientific classification
- Domain: Bacteria
- Kingdom: Thermotogati
- Phylum: Deinococcota
- Class: Deinococci
- Order: Deinococcales
- Family: Deinococcaceae; Brooks and Murray 1981
- Genus: Deinococcus; Rainey et al. 1997

Type species
- Deinococcus radiodurans Raj et al. 1960 ex Brooks and Murray 1981

Species
- See text

Synonyms
- Deinobacter Oyaizu et al. 1987

= Deinococcus =

Genus of bacteria

Deinococcus (from Ancient Greek δεινός (deinós), meaning "dreadful", and κόκκος (kókkos), meaning "grain") is in the formerly monotypic family Deinococcaceae, and one genus of three in the order Deinococcales of the bacterial phylum Deinococcota highly resistant to environmental hazards. These bacteria have thick cell walls that give them Gram-positive stains, but they also include a second membrane and are therefore closer in structure to Gram-negative bacteria. Deinococcus survive when their DNA is exposed to high doses of gamma and UV radiation. Whereas other bacteria change their structure in the presence of radiation, such as by forming endospores, Deinococcus tolerate it without changing their cellular form and do not retreat into a hardened structure. They are also characterized by the presence of the carotenoid pigment deinoxanthin that gives them their pink color. They are usually isolated according to these two criteria. In August 2020, scientists reported that bacteria from Earth, particularly Deinococcus bacteria, were found to survive for three years in outer space, based on studies conducted on the International Space Station. These findings support the notion of panspermia, the hypothesis that life exists throughout the Universe, distributed in various ways, including space dust, meteoroids, asteroids, comets, planetoids or contaminated spacecraft.

== Molecular signatures ==
Members of Deinococcus can be distinguished from all other bacteria through molecular signatures known as conserved signature indels (CSIs) and proteins (CSPs). An earlier study on Deinococcus identified nine CSIs and 58 CSPs which were exclusively shared by members of this genus. Some of the identified CSPs such as the DNA damage repair protein PprA and the single-stranded DNA-binding protein DdrB are thought to have functional roles in the DNA repair mechanism and radioresistance phenotype of Deinococcus.

In a more recent work focused on DNA repair proteins an additional 22 CSIs were identified as specific to this genus, including a 30 amino acid insert in the UvrA1 protein that is suggested to play in a role in the resistance ability of Deinococcus species against radiation and oxidation damage.

The uvrA1 gene in Deinococcus was found to form a novel genetic linkage with the genes of the proteins dCSP-1 (a transmembrane protein found only in Deinococcus species), DsbA and DsbB. The latter two proteins play a central role in the formation of disulfide bonds in proteins via oxidation-reduction of cysteine rich motifs (CXXC). The above cluster of genes forms a novel operon unique to Deinococcus species and the encoded proteins are predicted to function together to combat against DNA damage caused by reactive oxidative species from radiation.

The 30 aa CSI present in UvrA1 and another 5-7 aa CSI present in DsbA are located on surface loops of the proteins. The surface exposed loops/patches formed by these CSIs are thought to mediate protein-protein interactions with the transmembrane protein dCSP-1, thus facilitating a sequence of electron transfers that ultimately ameliorates oxidative damage.

== Comparative genomics ==
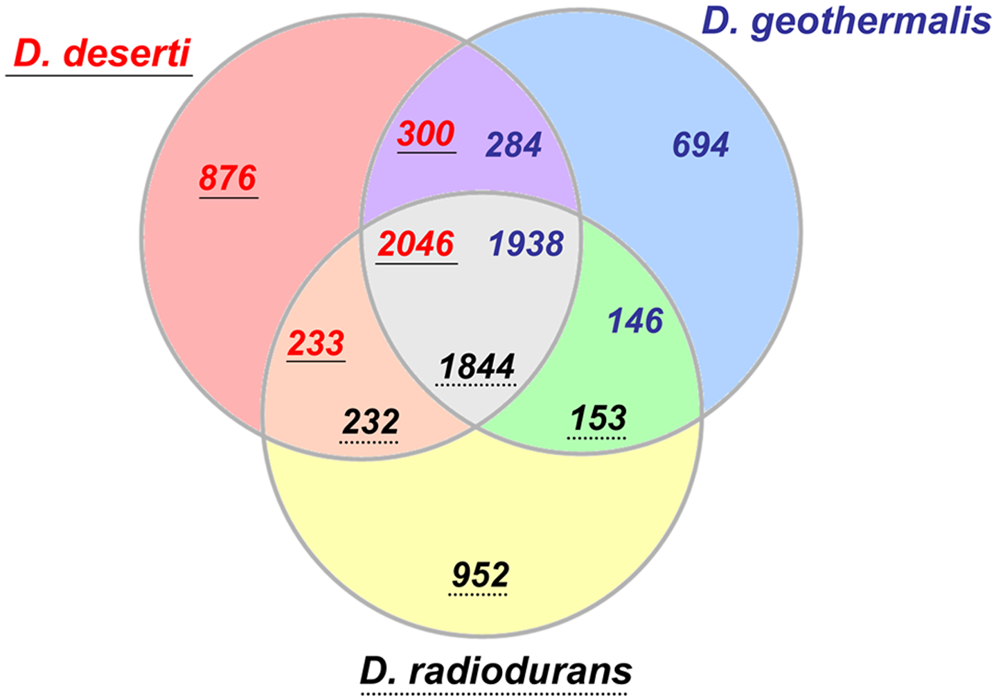
Orthologous gene comparison between three sequenced Deinococcus strains. The numbers correspond to the number of shared orthologs between two or all three species.

Although all species of the genus Deinococcus are related by definition, they exhibit substantial differences across their genomes. Most species appear to have about 3,000 genes, but only a fraction of them are shared in other species. For example, a 3-species comparison among D. radiodurans, D. deserti, and D. geothermalis shows that about two thirds of each genome is shared by all three species, but close to a third is specific and only found in one of the species (see figure). Once more genomes are included in such comparisons, the core genome will almost certainly be much smaller.

== Taxonomy ==
The currently accepted taxonomy is based on the List of Prokaryotic names with Standing in Nomenclature (LPSN) and National Center for Biotechnology Information (NCBI). As of August 2011, there were 47 species of Deinococcus described.

=== Phylogeny ===
Root node corresponds to Deinococcaceae.

Branch abbreviation key:

- (A) = GTDB genus Deinococcus_A
- (B) = GTDB genus Deinococcus_B
- (C) = GTDB genus Deinococcus_C, also known as "Deinococcus species-group 2"
- (*) = GTDB genus Deinococcus, or Deinococcus s.s.

16S rRNA based LTP_07_2026

- - - - Deinococcus~
        Deinococcus peraridilitoris Rainey et al. 2007
    - - Deinobacterium chartae Ekman et al. 2011
      - - Deinococcus~
          - Deinococcus pimensis Rainey and da Costa 2005
          - - Deinococcus papagonensis Rainey and da Costa 2005
            - Deinococcus yavapaiensis Rainey and da Costa 2005
  - - Deinococcus
      - D. maricopensis Rainey and da Costa 2005
      - - - D. roseus Asker et al. 2008
          - - D. cellulosilyticus Weon et al. 2007
            - D. misasensis Asker et al. 2008
        - - - - D. irradiatisoli Kim et al. 2018
              - D. persicinus Jeon et al. 2016
            - - D. alpinitundrae Callegan et al. 2008
              - - D. detaillensis Zhang et al. 2021
                - D. psychrotolerans Tian et al. 2019
          - - - D. sonorensis Rainey and da Costa 2005
              - - - D. aquiradiocola Asker et al. 2009
                  - D. ruber Kim et al. 2017
                - - D. altitudinis Callegan et al. 2008
                  - - D. claudionis Callegan et al. 2008
                    - D. radiomollis Callegan et al. 2008
            - - - D. radiophilus (ex Lewis 1973) Books and Murray 1981
                - - D. proteolyticus Brooks and Murray 1981
                  - - D. lacus Park et al. 2018
                    - D. piscis Shashidhar and Bandekar 2009
              - - - - D. budaensis Makk et al. 2016
                    - D. hopiensis Rainey and da Costa 2005
                  - - - D. murrayi Ferreira et al. 1997
                      - - D. rhizophilus Gao et al. 2024
                        - D. terrestris Wang et al. 2020
                    - - D. phoenicis Vaishampayan, Venkateswaran & Schwendner 2014
                      - - D. geothermalis Ferreira et al. 1997
                        - - - D. aluminii Kim et al. 2018
                            - D. metallilatus Kim et al. 2015
                          - - - D. aerius Yang et al. 2009
                              - D. apachensis Rainey and da Costa 2005
                            - - D. aetherius Yang et al. 2010
                              - - D. aestuarii Yin et al. 2022
                                - D. lichenicola Chen et al. 2026
                - - - - D. petrolearius Xi et al. 2019
                      - - D. citri Ahmed et al. 2014
                        - D. gobiensis Yuan et al. 2009
                    - - - D. metalli Feng et al. 2015
                        - D. radioresistens Srinivasan et al. 2016
                      - - - D. koreensis Baek et al. 2018 non Kim, Kang & Srinivasan 2017
                          - - D. rufus Wang et al. 2018
                            - D. yunweiensis Zhang et al. 2007
                        - - D. aerophilus Yoo et al. 2010
                          - - - - D. aerolatus Yoo et al. 2010
                                - D. humi Srinivasan et al. 2012
                              - - D. swuensis Lee et al. 2015
                                - D. radiopugnans Brooks and Murray 1981
                            - - D. frigens Hirsch et al. 2006
                              - - - D. arenicola Cheng et al. 2024
                                  - D. marmoris Hirsch et al. 2006
                                - - D. pantiae Jiya et al. 2026
                                  - D. saxicola Hirsch et al. 2006
                  - - - - D. reticulitermitis Chen et al. 2012
                        - D. taklimakanensis Liu et al. 2017
                      - - D. carri Kim et al. 2015
                        - - D. xinjiangensis Peng et al. 2009
                          - - D. antarcticus Dong et al. 2015
                            - - D. cavernae Zhu et al. 2022
                              - D. fonticola Makk et al. 2019
                    - - - - - D. deserti de Groot et al. 2005
                            - D. malanensis Zhu et al. 2017
                          - - D. hohokamensis Rainey and da Costa 2005
                            - D. navajonensis Rainey and da Costa 2005
                        - - - D. aquatilis Kämpfer et al. 2008
                            - D. puniceus Lee et al. 2014
                          - - - D. radiodurans (ex Raj et al. 1960) Brooks and Murray 1981
                              - D. wulumuqiensis Wang et al. 2010
                            - - D. ficus Lai et al. 2006 emend. Kämpfer 2009
                              - - D. enclensis Thorat et al. 2015
                                - D. terrigena Ten et al. 2019
                      - - - D. arcticus Wang et al. 2019
                          - - - D. aquaedulcis Yin et al. 2022
                              - D. multiflagellatus Kim et al. 2018
                            - - D. arboris Bae et al. 2022
                              - D. betulae Bae et al. 2022
                        - - D. taeanensis Lee et al. 2024
                          - - D. hibisci Moya et al. 2018
                            - - - D. sedimenti Lee et al. 2017
                                - - D. indicus Suresh et al. 2004
                                  - - D. caeni Im et al. 2008
                                    - - D. depolymerans Asker et al. 2011
                                      - - - D. aquaticus Im et al. 2008
                                          - D. guangxiensis Sun et al. 2025
                                        - - D. knuensis Lee et al. 2017
                                          - D. seoulensis Lee et al. 2016
                              - - D. radiotolerans Cha et al. 2015
                                - - - D. daejeonensis Srinivasan et al. 2012
                                    - D. grandis (Oyaizu et al. 1987) Rainey et al. 1997
                                  - - - D. saudiensis Hussain et al. 2016
                                      - D. soli Cha et al. 2016 non Zhang et al. 2011
                                    - - D. actinosclerus Joo et al. 2016
                                      - - D. arenae Lee et al. 2016
                                        - D. kurensis Akita et al. 2021

120 marker proteins based GTDB 11-RS232

- - - Deinobacterium chartae
    - - Deinococcus_C
        - Deinococcus misasensis
        - - Deinococcus cellulosilyticus
          - Deinococcus roseus
  - - Deinococcus
      - - (A)
          - D. peraridilitoris
          - - D. pimensis
            - D. yavapaiensis
      - - (B)
          D. maricopensis
        - (*)
          - - - D. sonorensis
              - - D. ruber
                - - D. aquiradiocola
                  - - D. altitudinis
                    - D. radiomollis
            - - D. irradiatisoli
              - - - D. alpinitundrae
                  - "D. rubellus"
                - - D. detaillensis
                  - D. psychrotolerans
          - - - D. lacus
              - - D. radiophilus
                - - D. piscis
                  - D. proteolyticus
            - - - - D. lichenicola
                  - - D. aetherius
                    - - "D. aestuarii"
                      - "D. planocerae" Lin et al. 2017
                - - - D. phoenicis
                    - - D. carri
                      - - D. geothermalis
                        - D. metallilatus
                  - - - D. aerius
                      - D. apachensis
                    - - D. hopiensis
                      - - D. budaensis
                        - - D. murrayi
                          - - D. rhizophilus
                            - D. terrestris
              - - - D. puniceus
                  - - D. aquatilis
                    - D. oregonensis Gundlapally & Garcia-Pichel 2025
                - - - D. reticulitermitis
                    - - D. radiodurans
                      - D. wulumuqiensis
                  - - - - D. gobiensis
                        - D. petrolearius
                      - - - D. xinjiangensis
                          - - D. antarcticus Dong et al. 2015
                            - D. fonticola [incl. D. cavernae]
                    - - - - D. ficus
                          - D. taklimakanensis
                        - - - D. deserti
                            - D. malanensis
                          - - D. hohokamensis
                            - D. navajonensis
                      - - - D. aerophiles
                          - - D. humi
                            - - D. radiopugnans
                              - - D. aerolatus
                                - - D. frigens
                                  - - D. arenicola
                                    - - D. marmoris
                                      - D. navajonensis
                        - - - D. koreensis
                            - - D. metalli
                              - - D. rufus
                                - D. yunweiensis
                          - - - D. depolymerans
                              - - D. caeni
                                - - D. aquaticus
                                  - D. seoulensis [incl. D. knuensis]
                            - - - D. betulae
                                - - D. arcticus
                                  - - "D. aquaedulcis"
                                    - D. multiflagellatus
                              - - D. taeanensis
                                - - D. sedimenti
                                  - - D. radiotolerans
                                    - - D. grandis [incl. D. daejeonensis;
                                        "D. xianganensis" Zheng et al. 2014]
                                      - - D. actinosclerus [incl. D. arenae; D. kurensis]
                                        - D. soli Cha et al. 2016 non Zhang et al. 2011
                                          [incl. D. saudiensis]

Species incertae sedis:

- "D. aquivivus" Kaempferet al. 2008
- "D. gammatolerans" Srinivasan, Kang & Kim 2017
- "D. koreense" Kim, Kang & Srinivasan 2017 non Baek et al. 2018
- "D. populi" Li, Kudo & Tonouchi 2018
- "D. saharensis" corrig. Bouraoui et al. 2012
- "D. soli" Zhang et al. 2011 non Cha et al. 2016
- D. superficialis Zhang et al. 2026
- D. xibeiensis Wang et al. 2010

== See also ==
- List of bacteria genera
- List of bacterial orders
