= Deinococcus deserti =

Scientific classification
- Domain: Bacteria
- Kingdom: Thermotogati
- Phylum: Deinococcota
- Class: Deinococci
- Order: Deinococcales
- Family: Deinococcaceae
- Genus: Deinococcus
- Species: D. deserti

Binomial name
- Deinococcus deserti de Groot et al. 2005

Species of bacterium

Deinococcus deserti is a Gram-negative, rod-shaped bacterium that belongs to the Deinococcaceae, a group of extremely radiotolerant bacteria. D. deserti and other Deinococcaceae exhibit an extraordinary ability to withstand ionizing radiation.

== Description ==
Deinococcus deserti has in common with other Deinococci a highly condensed nucleoid, a high cellular Mn/Fe ratio, and several of the Deinococcus specific radiation tolerance-associated genes, for example, ddrA to ddrD, pprA, and irrE.

The genome of D. deserti VCD115 is composed of four replicons: a main chromosome (2.82 Mb) and three plasmids, P1 (325 kb), P2 (314 kb) and P3 (396 kb).

== History ==
Two gamma- and UV-radiation-tolerant strains were isolated from a mixture of sand samples collected in the Sahara Desert in Morocco and Tunisia, after exposure of the sand to 15 kGy gamma radiation. The strains did not grow on rich medium such as trypticase soy broth (TSB), but did grow as whitish colonies on tenfold-diluted TSB. The genotypic and phenotypic properties allowed differentiation from recognized Deinococcus species. The strains were therefore identified as representing a novel species, for which the name Deinococcus deserti sp. nov. is proposed.

== Radioresistance ==
Chromosomes with numerous radiation or desiccation-induced double-strand breaks can be repaired in a few hours in D. deserti. The extreme radiotolerance of Deinococcaceae was the object of intense investigations using D. radiodurans as model.

== Mechanisms of Radioresistance ==
In cells subjected to irradiation, DNA recombinase, RecA, was the first protein that was found strongly induced. RecA is essential for radiotolerance and for the fidelity of DNA repair and genome stability in D. radiodurans. The molecular mechanisms underlying DNA repair were also examined by transcriptomics leading to the description of a repertoire of genes responding to acute gamma irradiation, including genes involved in DNA replication, repair and recombination, cell wall metabolism, cellular transport and many with uncharacterized functions.

In previous microarray experiments with D. radiodurans, the five most highly radio-induced genes were the Deinococcus-specific genes ddrA, ddrB, ddrC, ddrD, and pprA. Their homologs in D. deserti were also among the most highly induced, showing that not only their presence but also their strong upregulation in response to radiation damage is conserved.

A common 17-base pair radiation/desiccation response motif (RDRM) has been identified upstream of a set of radiation-induced genes, including various DNA repair genes such as recA, gyrA, uvrB and ssb, strongly suggesting the presence of an RDR regulon that is conserved in Deinococcus species. The irrE gene is essential for radiation resistance and required for the radiation-induced expression of recA and other genes with an RDRM (radiation/desiccation response motif) site in D. radiodurans and D. deserti. DdrO could be the global regulator of the RDR regulon, because it is the only induced and conserved regulator gene preceded by an RDRM site in D. radiodurans, D. geothermalis and D. deserti. IrrE is a site-specific protease that cleaves and inactivates repressor DdrO, resulting in induced expression of genes required for DNA repair and cell survival after exposure to radiation.

RecAC and RecAP are functional proteins that allow repair of massive DNA damage after exposure of D. deserti to high doses of gamma and UV radiation. ImuY and DnaE2 are involved in UV-induced point mutagenesis.

== Evolution of Radioresistance ==
The evolution of organisms that are able to survive acute irradiation doses of 15,000 Gy is difficult to explain given the apparent absence of highly radioactive habitats on Earth over geologic time. Thus, it seems more likely that the natural selection pressure for the evolution of radiation-resistant bacteria was chronic exposure to nonradioactive forms of DNA damage, in particular those promoted by desiccation.

== Proteomics ==
Accurate genome annotation of its 3455 genes was guided at the stage of primary annotation by an extensive proteome analysis. A set of 1348 proteins was uncovered after growth in standard conditions and proteome fractionation by phenyl-Sepharose chromatography.

In this study, 664 N-terminal peptides from 341 proteins were characterized, leading to the validation of 278 and the correction of 63 translation initiation codons in the D. deserti VCD115 genome. Four new open reading frames were also detected in its genome through the detection of peptidic signatures for the corresponding polypeptides. Peptides were identified using the MASCOT search engine against a database consisting of a six-frame translation of the entire D. deserti genome. This database comprised 65,801 hypothetical protein sequences with a large fraction of short ORFs (68% of the ORFs have less than 80 residues).

At this stage, 557 have signatures matched the N termini of 278 different proteins previously annotated.

1119 polypeptides from D. deserti were predicted to contain a signal peptide either by the neural networks or hidden Markov model approaches.

A total of 341 protein N termini were confidently identified in the D. deserti TMPP-labeled proteome. Among these, 63 were not correctly annotated in the first D. deserti genome annotation and should be modified accordingly. There has been a comparison between the gene sequences of the three sequenced Deinococcus genomes. It is proposed that the N termini of 37 and 100 additional proteins from D. geothermalis and D. radiodurans genomes, respectively, should be reannotated. When considering the manually validated TMPP-modified peptides, 664 unique signatures for N termini were identified with 398 tryptic and 266 chymotryptic sequences. These two digestions were thus found to be complementary. The N termini data set corresponds to 10% of the theoretical proteome. A significant number of erroneous annotations have probably still to be corrected.
