= OREOcube =

ESA experiment investigating effects of cosmic radiation on organic compounds

OREOcube (ORganics Exposure in Orbit cube) is an experiment designed by the European Space Agency (ESA) with the NASA that will investigate the effects of solar and cosmic radiation on selected organic compounds. It will consist in a 12-month orbital study of the effects of the outer space environment on astrobiologically relevant materials in an external exposure facility on the International Space Station (ISS).

The project was originally aimed to be launched in 2016, however as of 2024 it has not yet been launched, will examine the evolution of complex organic molecules in outer space, as well as the forms in which prebiotic organic compounds has been preserved. It will also study the role that solid mineral surfaces play in the photo-chemical evolution, transport, and distribution of organics. The principal investigator is Pascale Ehrenfreund.

== Objective ==
The objective of OREOcube is to investigate the influence of mineralogically relevant inorganic materials on the stability, modification, and degradation of the organic molecules during long-duration radiation exposure on the ISS.

Organic compounds, thought to be the starting material for prebiotic chemistry, could have partly had an extraterrestrial origin. This addition could have been done by bombardment by comets and meteorites, which contain organic molecules. (see also: pseudo-panspermia)

== Spacecraft description ==
OREOcube is packaged as an identical pair of 10 cm (3.9 in) cubes, each weighing <2 kg and containing an UV-visible-NIR spectrometer, a 24-sample carousel, and integral optics enabling use of the Sun as a light source for spectroscopy, along with the electronics and data storage to make each cube an autonomous stand-alone instrument package requiring only a standard power and data interface. Unlike other similar experiments, OREOcube will monitor changes in the UV/vis/NIR spectrum of the samples in situ at different times during their exposure to outer space. OREOScube will provide data sets that capture critical kinetic and mechanistic details of sample reactions that cannot be obtained with current exposure facilities in low Earth orbit.

Samples to be exposed include amino acids, sugars, small N-heterocycles, nucleobases, polycyclic aromatic hydrocarbons (PAH), redox molecules, and organosulfur compounds. The project examines photodissociation reaction rates, mechanisms, products and degradation of the organic molecules in the astrobiological context.

The project is currently being developed by the ESA with collaboration with NASA's Exploration Systems Mission Directorate (ESMD) however no official launch date has yet been set.

== See also ==
- Abiogenesis
- Astrobiology
- Bion
- BIOPAN
- Biosatellite program
- EXPOSE
- List of microorganisms tested in outer space
- O/OREOS
- Tanpopo
