= Deinococcus aerius =

Scientific classification
- Domain: Bacteria
- Kingdom: Thermotogati
- Phylum: Deinococcota
- Class: Deinococci
- Order: Deinococcales
- Family: Deinococcaceae
- Genus: Deinococcus
- Species: D. aerius

Binomial name
- Deinococcus aerius Yang et al., 2009

Species of bacterium

Deinococcus aerius is an anaerobic bacterium that can be found in the atmosphere above the island of Japan. Living in such conditions makes these bacteria highly resistant to desiccation, UV-C, and gamma radiation. Although previously unidentified as strain TR0125, this bacterium was determined to be Deinococcus aerius by 16S rRNA sequencing.

== Gram type, morphology ==
When grown on anaerobic enrichment agar, colonies of D. aerius were observed to be “circular, convex, shiny and orange”. A gram stain revealed that these bacteria are gram-positive. Scanning electron microscopy revealed that cells of this bacterium are circular in shape and approximately 1.0–1.5 micrometers in size. Additionally, they were found to exist as “single cells, or in pairs, tetrads or clusters”.

== Metabolism ==
Several metabolism tests have shown that D. aerius is not involved in “nitrate reduction, urease, arginine hydrolase, and ornithine decarboxylase activities and was unable to use some carbon sources”. However, subsequent studies have shown that these bacteria are able to grow using “arabinose, glucosamine, ornithine, glutamate, maltose, sucrose, proline, raffinose, cysteine, lysine and methionine” as carbon sources.

== Where it is found ==
Deinococcus. aerius has been previously isolated from the atmosphere above Japan at altitudes between 0.8 and 5.8 km. To do this, dust samples were collected “on membrane filters using an ASD1 air sampler”. The samples were then incubated on anaerobic enrichment agar and strain TR0125 was identified as D. aerius.

== Media grown on ==
Deinococcus aerius has been cultured on mTGE agar which contains beef extract, tryptone, glucose and Difto Bacto agar. A growth analysis revealed that this bacterium grows best at temperatures between 25 and 30 °Celsius and did not grow at 4, 10 or 47 °C.

== Ecology ==
Because so little is known about this organism, its interactions with members of its genus as well as other organisms is still unknown.

== Diversity ==
Using 16S rRNA sequencing, D. aerius was able to be placed on a phylogenetic tree to determine its relationships to other organisms in the genus. Analysis of the genome revealed that D. aerius had 92.3% genomic similarity to D. geothermalis and 95.7% genomic similarity to D. apachensi.

== Genome ==
Whole-genome sequencing was used to determine features of the D. aerius genome. It was found that the genome had a total length of 4,524,446 base pairs. Included in this, were 4,446 protein-coding sequences, 52 tRNA operons and 1 rRNA operon”. It has been observed that D. aerius does not grow as well as other Deinococcus species, which may be due in part to its single rRNA operon. Having only one rRNA operon would decrease the rate of protein synthesis in these bacteria, thus decreasing the rate for possible growth.
