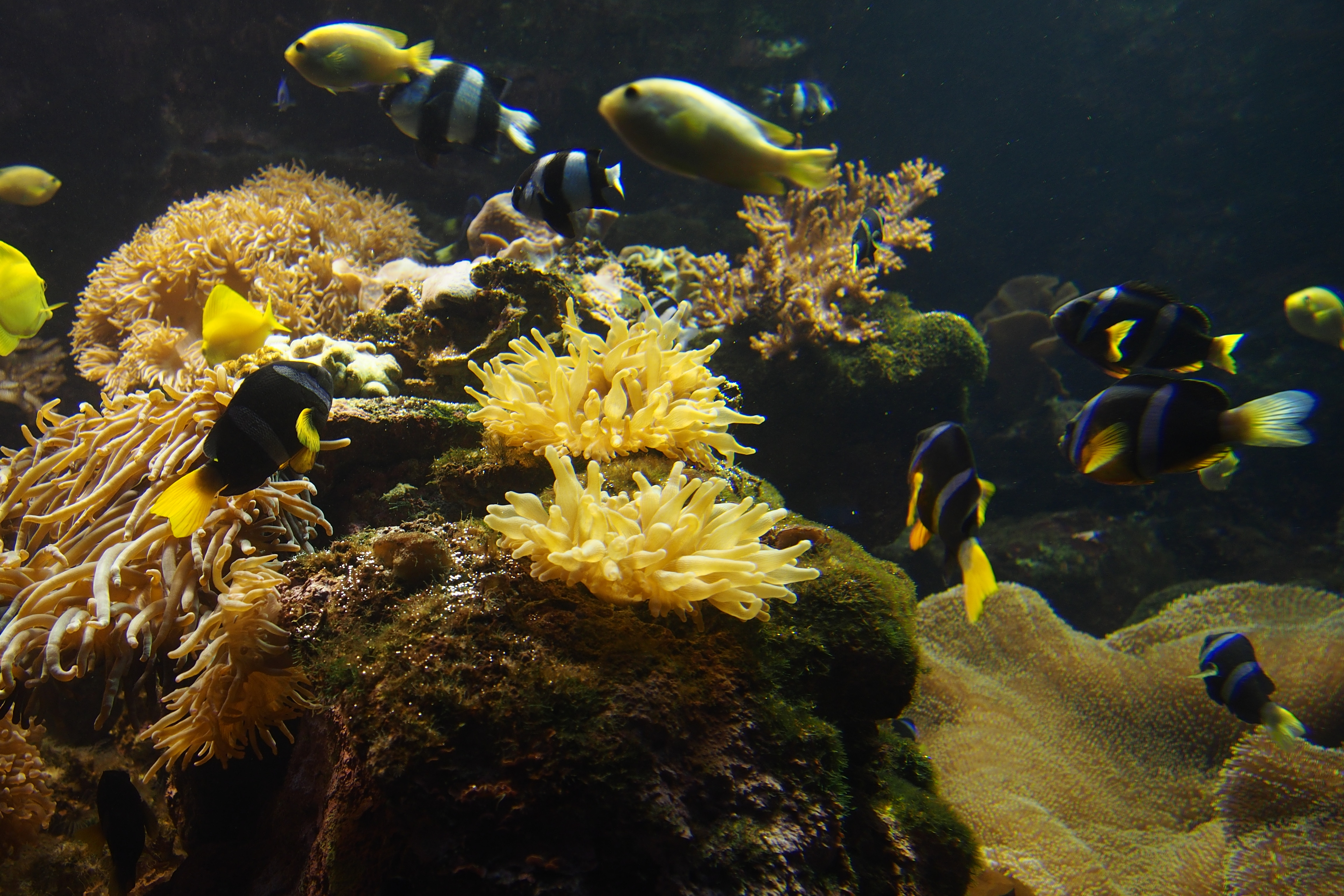
- Diverse forms of life on a coral reef

Scientific classification

Domains, supergroups and other
- Life on Earth: Cellular life; Archaea; Bacteria; Eukaryota; Amorphea (including animals and fungi); CRuMs; Discoba; Metamonada; Malawimonadida; Ancyromonadida; Hemimastigophora; Provora; Diaphoretickes; Archaeplastida (including plants); Cryptista; Haptista; TSAR?; Telonemia; SAR; Stramenopiles; Alveolata; Rhizaria; Parakaryon (incertae sedis); Parakaryon myojinensis; Non-cellular life; Viruses (Note: Viruses are strongly believed not to descend from a common ancestor, with each realm corresponding to separate instances of a virus coming into existence.); Viroid

= Life =

Life Temporal range: 3770–0 Ma Archean – present (possible Hadean origin)

Matter with biological processes

Life is the capacity in matter, formed of one or more units called cells, for processes such as cell signalling, homeostasis, metabolism, cell growth, adaptation, response to stimuli, and reproduction. All life eventually reaches a state of death. Many philosophical definitions of living systems have been proposed, such as self-organising systems. Defining life is further complicated by viruses, which replicate only in host cells, and the possibility of extraterrestrial life, which could be very different from life on Earth. Life exists all over the Earth in air, water, and soil, with many ecosystems forming the biosphere. Some of these are harsh environments occupied only by extremophiles. The life in a particular ecosystem is called its biota.

Life has been studied since ancient times, with theories such as Empedocles's materialism asserting that it was composed of four eternal elements, and Aristotle's hylomorphism asserting that living things have souls and embody both form and matter. Life originated at least 3.5 billion years ago, resulting in a universal common ancestor. This evolved into all the species that exist now, by way of many extinct species, some of which have left traces as fossils. Attempts to classify living things, too, began with Aristotle. Modern classification began with Carl Linnaeus's system of binomial nomenclature in the 1740s.

Living things are composed of biochemical molecules, formed mainly from a few core chemical elements. All living things contain two types of macromolecules, proteins and nucleic acids, the latter usually both DNA and RNA: these carry the information needed by each species, including the instructions to make each type of protein. The proteins, in turn, serve as the machinery which carries out the many chemical processes of life. The cell is the structural and functional unit of life. Smaller organisms, including prokaryotes (bacteria and archaea), consist of small single cells. Larger organisms, mainly eukaryotes, can consist of single cells or may be multicellular with more complex structure. Life is only known to exist on Earth, but extraterrestrial life is thought to be probable. Artificial life is being simulated and explored by scientists and engineers.

== Definitions ==
=== Challenge ===
The definition of life has long been a challenge for scientists and philosophers. This is partially because life is a process, not a substance. This is complicated by a lack of knowledge of the characteristics of living entities, if any, that may have developed outside Earth. Philosophical definitions of life have also been put forward, with similar difficulties in how to distinguish living things from the non-living. Legal definitions of life have been debated, though these generally focus on the decision to declare a human dead, and the legal ramifications of this decision. At least 123 definitions of life have been compiled.

A biota is the assemblage of living things, especially the animals and plants, that inhabit a specific place and time, such as an ecosystem or biome; thus, the goal of nature conservation is to preserve the biota of an ecosystem.

=== Descriptive ===
Since there is no consensus for a definition of life, most current definitions in biology, the scientific study of life, are descriptive. Life is considered a characteristic of something that preserves, furthers, or reinforces its existence in the given environment. This implies all or most of the following traits:

1. Homeostasis: regulation of the internal environment to maintain a constant state; for example, sweating to reduce temperature.
2. Organisation: being structurally composed of one or more cells – the basic units of life.
3. Metabolism: transformation of energy, used to convert chemicals into cellular components (anabolism) and to decompose organic matter (catabolism). Living things require energy for homeostasis and other activities.
4. Growth: maintenance of a higher rate of anabolism than catabolism. A growing organism increases in size and structure.
5. Adaptation: the evolutionary process whereby an organism becomes better able to live in its habitat.
6. Response to stimuli: such as the contraction of a unicellular organism away from external chemicals, the complex reactions involving all the senses of multicellular organisms, or the motion of the leaves of a plant turning toward the Sun (phototropism), and chemotaxis.
7. Reproduction: the ability to produce new individual organisms, either asexually from a single parent organism or sexually from two parent organisms.

=== Physics ===
From a physics perspective, an organism is a thermodynamic system with an organised molecular structure that can reproduce itself and evolve as survival dictates. Thermodynamically, life has been described as an open system which makes use of gradients in its surroundings to create imperfect copies of itself. Another way of putting this is to define life as "a self-sustained chemical system capable of undergoing Darwinian evolution", a definition adopted by a NASA committee attempting to define life for the purposes of exobiology, based on a suggestion by Carl Sagan. This definition, however, has been widely criticised because, according to it, a single sexually reproducing individual is not alive as it is incapable of evolving on its own.

=== Living systems ===
Others take a living systems theory viewpoint that does not necessarily depend on molecular chemistry. One systemic definition of life is that living things are self-organising and autopoietic (self-producing). Variations of this include Stuart Kauffman's definition as an autonomous agent or a multi-agent system capable of reproducing itself and of completing at least one thermodynamic work cycle. This definition is extended by the evolution of novel functions over time. Living systems are characterized by a multiscale, hierarchical organisation, spanning from molecular machines to cells, organs, tissues, organisms, populations, ecosystems, up to the whole biosphere.

=== Death ===
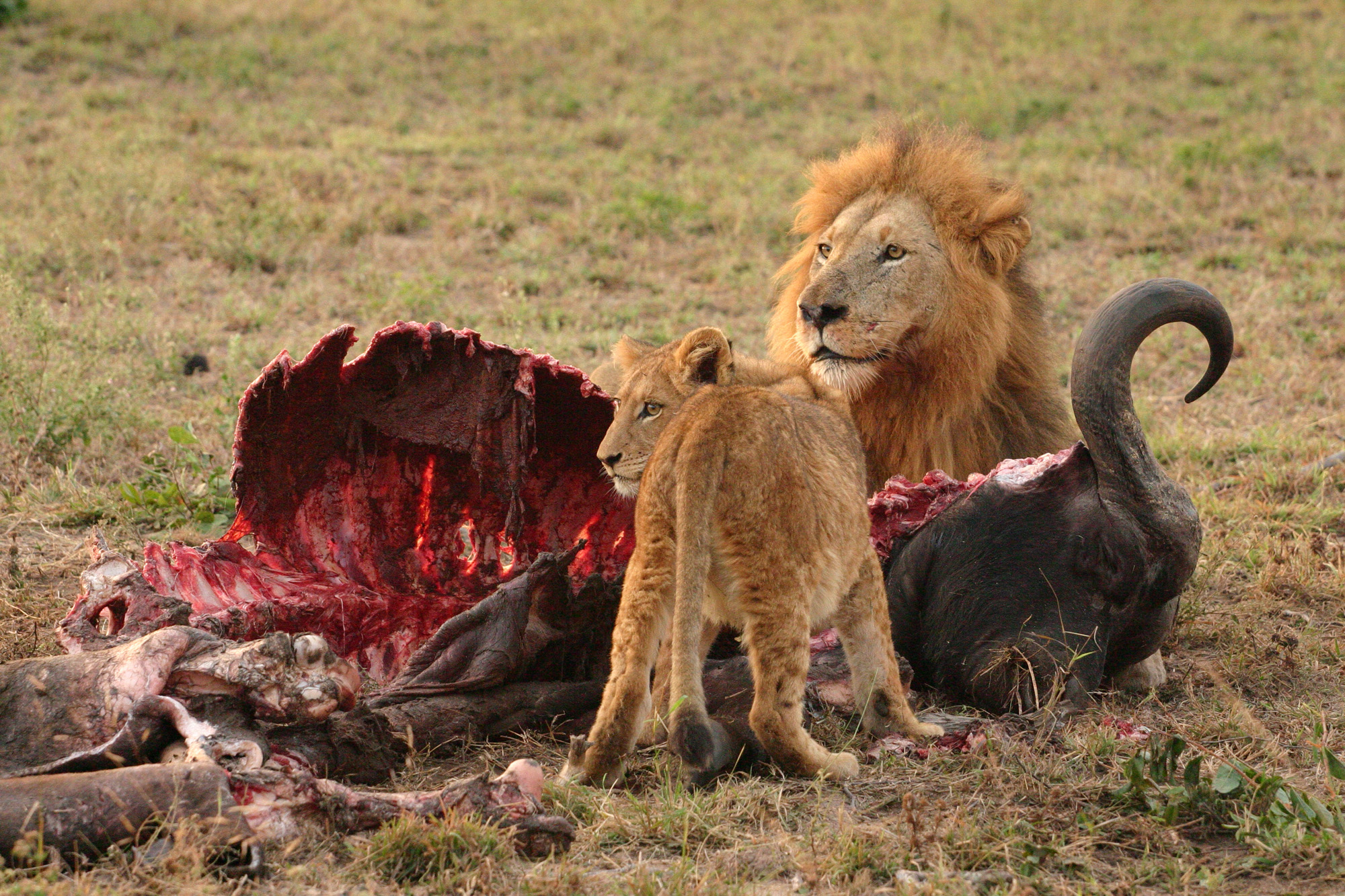
Animal corpses, like this African buffalo, are recycled by the ecosystem, providing energy and nutrients for living organisms.

Death is the termination of all vital functions or life processes in an organism or cell. One of the challenges in defining death is distinguishing it from life. Death would seem to refer to either the moment life ends, or when the state that follows life begins. However, determining when death has occurred is difficult, as cessation of life functions is often not simultaneous across organ systems. Such determination, therefore, requires drawing conceptual lines between life and death. This is problematic because there is little consensus over how to define life. The nature of death has for millennia been a central concern of the world's religious traditions and of philosophical inquiry. Many religions maintain faith in either a kind of afterlife or reincarnation for the soul, or resurrection of the body at a later date.

=== Viruses ===
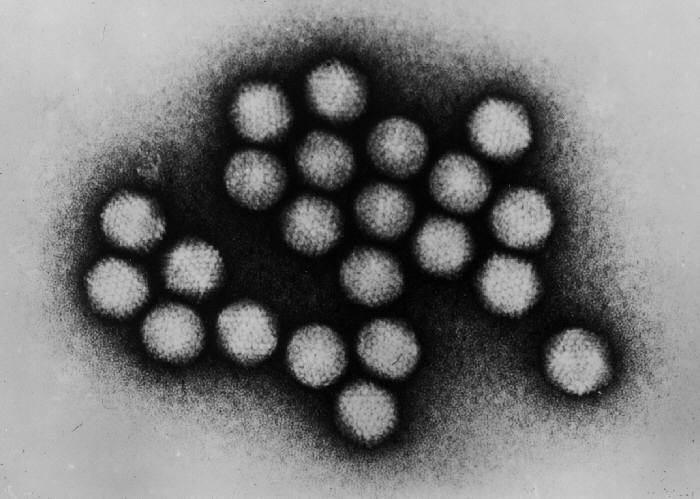
Adenoviruses as seen under an electron microscope

Whether or not viruses should be considered as alive is controversial. They are most often considered as just gene-coding replicators rather than forms of life. They have been described as "organisms at the edge of life" because they possess genes, evolve by natural selection, and replicate by making multiple copies of themselves through self-assembly. However, viruses do not metabolise, and they require a host cell to make new products. Virus self-assembly within host cells has implications for the study of the origin of life, as it may support the hypothesis that life could have started as self-assembling organic molecules.

== History of study ==
=== Materialism ===
Some of the earliest theories of life were materialist, holding that all that exists is matter, and that life is merely a complex form or arrangement of matter. Empedocles (430 BC) argued that everything in the universe is made up of a combination of four eternal "elements" or "roots of all": earth, water, air, and fire. All change is explained by the arrangement and rearrangement of these four elements. The various forms of life are caused by an appropriate mixture of elements. Democritus (460 BC) was an atomist; he thought that the essential characteristic of life was having a soul (psyche), and that the soul, like everything else, was composed of fiery atoms. He elaborated on fire because of the apparent connection between life and heat, and because fire moves. Plato, in contrast, held that the world was organised by permanent forms, reflected imperfectly in matter; forms provided direction or intelligence, explaining the regularities observed in the world.

The mechanistic materialism that originated in ancient Greece was revived and revised by the French philosopher René Descartes (1596–1650), who held that animals and humans were assemblages of parts that together functioned as a machine. Gottfried Wilhelm Leibniz emphasised the hierarchical organisation of living machines, noting in his book Monadology (1714) that "...the machines of nature, that is living bodies, are still machines in their smallest parts, to infinity." This idea was developed further by Julien Offray de La Mettrie (1709–1750) in his book L'Homme Machine. In the 19th century, the advances in cell theory in biological science encouraged this view. The evolutionary theory of Charles Darwin (1859) is a mechanistic explanation for the origin of species by means of natural selection. At the beginning of the 20th century Stéphane Leduc (1853–1939) promoted the idea that biological processes could be understood in terms of physics and chemistry, and that their growth resembled that of inorganic crystals immersed in solutions of sodium silicate. His ideas, set out in his book La biologie synthétique, were widely dismissed during his lifetime, but have incurred a resurgence of interest in the work of Russell, Barge and colleagues.

=== Hylomorphism ===
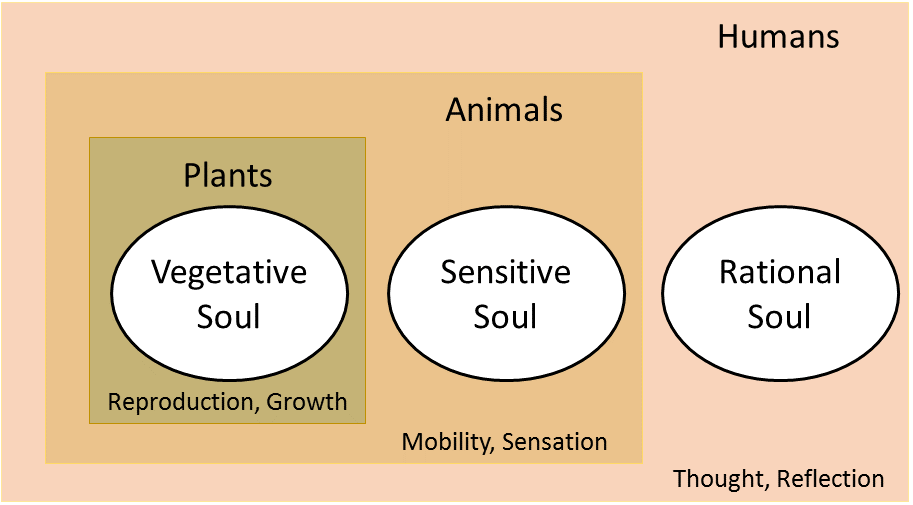
The structure of the souls of plants, animals, and humans, according to Aristotle

Hylomorphism is a theory first expressed by the Greek philosopher Aristotle (322 BC). The application of hylomorphism to biology was important to Aristotle, and biology is extensively covered in his extant writings. In this view, everything in the material universe has both matter and form, and the form of a living thing is its soul (Greek psyche, Latin anima). There are three kinds of souls: the vegetative soul of plants, which causes them to grow and decay and nourish themselves, but does not cause motion and sensation; the animal soul, which causes animals to move and feel; and the rational soul, which is the source of consciousness and reasoning, which (Aristotle believed) is found only in man. Each higher soul has all of the attributes of the lower ones. Aristotle believed that while matter can exist without form, form cannot exist without matter, and that therefore the soul cannot exist without the body.

This account is consistent with teleological explanations of life, which account for phenomena in terms of purpose or goal-directedness. Thus, the whiteness of the polar bear's coat is explained by its purpose of camouflage. The direction of causality (from the future to the past) is in contradiction with the scientific evidence for natural selection, which explains the consequence in terms of a prior cause. Biological features are explained not by looking at future optimal results, but by looking at the past evolutionary history of a species, which led to the natural selection of the features in question.

=== Spontaneous generation ===
Spontaneous generation was the belief that living organisms can form without descent from similar organisms. Typically, the idea was that certain forms such as fleas could arise from inanimate matter such as dust or the supposed seasonal generation of mice and insects from mud or garbage.

The theory of spontaneous generation was proposed by Aristotle, who compiled and expanded the work of prior natural philosophers and the various ancient explanations of the appearance of organisms; it was considered the best explanation for two millennia. It was decisively dispelled by the experiments of Louis Pasteur in 1859, who expanded upon the investigations of predecessors such as Francesco Redi. Disproof of the traditional ideas of spontaneous generation is no longer controversial among biologists.

=== Vitalism ===
Vitalism is the belief that there is a non-material life principle. This originated with Georg Ernst Stahl (17th century), and it remained popular until the middle of the 19th century. It appealed to philosophers such as Henri Bergson, Friedrich Nietzsche, and Wilhelm Dilthey, anatomists like Xavier Bichat, and chemists like Justus von Liebig. Vitalism included the idea that there was a fundamental difference between organic and inorganic material, and the belief that organic material could only be derived from living things. This was disproved in 1828, when Friedrich Wöhler prepared urea from inorganic materials. This Wöhler synthesis is considered the starting point of modern organic chemistry. It is of historical significance because, for the first time, an organic compound was produced in inorganic reactions.

During the 1850s, Hermann von Helmholtz—anticipated by Julius Robert von Mayer—demonstrated that no energy is lost in muscle movement, suggesting that there were no "vital forces" necessary to move a muscle. These results led to the abandonment of scientific interest in vitalistic theories, especially after Eduard Buchner's demonstration that alcoholic fermentation could occur in cell-free extracts of yeast. Nonetheless, belief still exists in pseudoscientific theories such as homoeopathy, which interprets diseases and sickness as caused by disturbances in a hypothetical vital force or life force.

== Development ==
Life timeline
← / Earth formed; ← / Earliest water; ← / LUCA; ← / Earliest fossils; ← / Great Oxygenation Event; ← / Sexual reproduction; ← / Earliest fungi; ← / Neoproterozoic oxygenation event; ← / Ediacaran biota; ← / Cambrian explosion; ← / Earliest tetrapods; ← / Earliest hominoid
(million years ago)

=== Origin of life ===
The age of Earth is about 4.54 billion years. Life on Earth has existed for at least 3.5 billion years, with the oldest physical traces of life dating back 3.7 billion years. Estimates from molecular clocks, as summarised in the TimeTree public database, place the origin of life around 4 billion years ago. Hypotheses on the origin of life attempt to explain the formation of a universal last common ancestor from simple organic molecules via pre-cellular life to protocells and metabolism. In 2016, a set of 355 genes from the last universal common ancestor was tentatively identified.

The biosphere is postulated to have developed, from the origin of life onwards, at least some 3.5 billion years ago. The earliest evidence for life on Earth includes biogenic graphite found in 3.7 billion-year-old metasedimentary rocks from Western Greenland and microbial mat fossils found in 3.48 billion-year-old sandstone from Western Australia. More recently, in 2015, "remains of biotic life" were found in 4.1 billion-year-old rocks in Western Australia. In 2017, putative fossilised microorganisms (or microfossils) were announced to have been discovered in hydrothermal vent precipitates in the Nuvvuagittuq Belt of Quebec, Canada that were as old as 4.28 billion years, the oldest record of life on Earth, suggesting "an almost instantaneous emergence of life" after ocean formation 4.4 billion years ago, and not long after the formation of the Earth 4.54 billion years ago.

=== Evolution ===
Evolution is the change in heritable characteristics of biological populations over successive generations. It results in the appearance of new species and often the disappearance of old ones. Evolution occurs when evolutionary processes such as natural selection (including sexual selection) and genetic drift act on genetic variation, resulting in certain characteristics increasing or decreasing in frequency within a population over successive generations. The process of evolution has given rise to biodiversity at every level of biological organisation.

=== Fossils ===
Fossils are the preserved remains or traces of organisms from the remote past. The totality of fossils, both discovered and undiscovered, and their placement in layers (strata) of sedimentary rock is known as the fossil record. A preserved specimen is called a fossil if it is older than the arbitrary date of 10,000 years ago. Hence, fossils range in age from the youngest at the start of the Holocene Epoch to the oldest from the Archaean Eon, up to 3.4 billion years old.

=== Extinction ===
Extinction is the process by which a species dies out. The moment of extinction is the death of the last individual of that species. Because a species' potential range may be very large, determining this moment is difficult, and it is usually done retrospectively after a period of apparent absence. Species become extinct when they are no longer able to survive in a changing habitat or against superior competition. Over 99% of all the species that have ever lived are now extinct. Mass extinctions may have accelerated evolution by providing opportunities for new groups of organisms to diversify.

== Environmental conditions ==
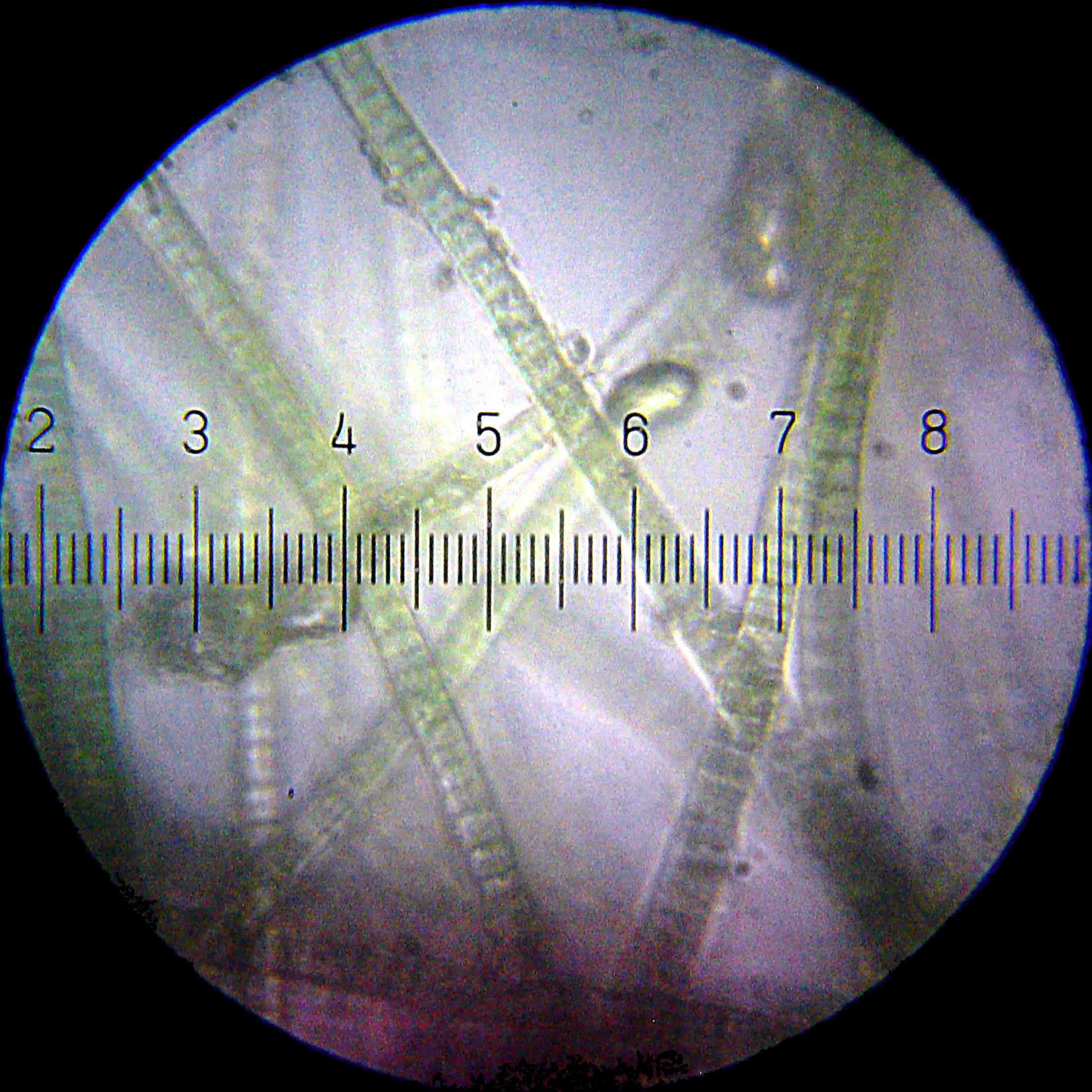
Cyanobacteria dramatically changed the composition of life forms on Earth by leading to the near-extinction of oxygen-intolerant organisms

The diversity of life on Earth is a result of the dynamic interplay between genetic opportunity, metabolic capability, environmental challenges, and symbiosis. For most of its existence, Earth's habitable environment has been dominated by microorganisms and subjected to their metabolism and evolution. As a consequence of these microbial activities, the physical-chemical environment on Earth has been changing on a geologic time scale, thereby affecting the path of evolution of subsequent life. For example, the release of molecular oxygen by cyanobacteria as a by-product of photosynthesis induced global changes in the Earth's environment. Because oxygen was toxic to most life on Earth at the time, this posed novel evolutionary challenges, and ultimately resulted in the formation of Earth's major animal and plant species. This interplay between organisms and their environment is an inherent feature of living systems.

=== Biosphere ===
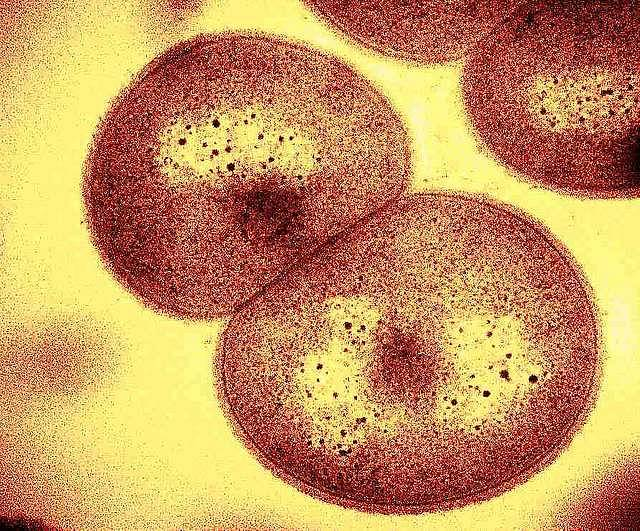
Deinococcus geothermalis, a bacterium that thrives in geothermal springs and deep ocean subsurfaces

The biosphere is the global sum of all ecosystems. It can also be termed the zone of life on Earth, a closed system (apart from solar and cosmic radiation and heat from the interior of the Earth), and largely self-regulating. Organisms exist in every part of the biosphere, including soil, hot springs, inside rocks at least 19 km (12 mi) deep underground, the deepest parts of the ocean, and at least 64 km (40 mi) high in the atmosphere. For example, spores of Penicillium notatum have been detected in the mesosphere at an altitude of 57 to 77 km. Under test conditions, life forms have been observed to survive in the vacuum of space. Life forms thrive in the deep Mariana Trench, and inside rocks up to 580 m (1,900 ft; 0.36 mi) below the sea floor under 2,590 m (8,500 ft; 1.61 mi) of ocean off the coast of the northwestern United States, and 2,400 m (7,900 ft; 1.5 mi) beneath the seabed off Japan. There are even bacteria that thrive in nuclear reactors. In 2014, life forms were found living 800 m (2,600 ft; 0.50 mi) below the ice of Antarctica. Expeditions of the International Ocean Discovery Program found unicellular life in 120 °C sediment 1.2 km below seafloor in the Nankai Trough subduction zone. According to one researcher, "You can find microbes everywhere—they're extremely adaptable to conditions, and survive wherever they are."

=== Range of tolerance ===
The inert components of an ecosystem are the physical and chemical factors necessary for life—energy (sunlight or chemical energy), water, heat, atmosphere, gravity, nutrients, and ultraviolet solar radiation protection. In most ecosystems, the conditions vary during the day and from one season to the next. To survive in these ecosystems, organisms must be able to tolerate a range of conditions defined as the "range of tolerance". Outside this range are the "zones of physiological stress", where survival and reproduction are possible but not optimal. Beyond these zones are the "zones of intolerance", where survival and reproduction of that organism is unlikely or impossible. Organisms that have a wide range of tolerance are more widely distributed than organisms with a narrow range of tolerance.

=== Extremophiles ===
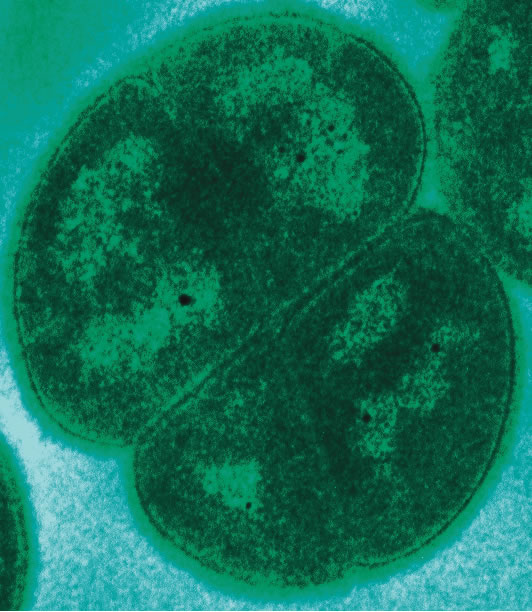
Deinococcus radiodurans is an extremophile that can resist extremes of cold, dehydration, vacuum, acid, and radiation exposure

To survive, some microorganisms have evolved to withstand freezing, complete desiccation, starvation, high levels of radiation exposure, and other physical or chemical challenges. These extremophile microorganisms may survive exposure to such conditions for long periods. They excel at exploiting uncommon sources of energy. Characterization of the structure and metabolic diversity of microbial communities in such extreme environments is ongoing.

== Classification ==
=== Western antiquity ===
The first classification of organisms was made by the Greek philosopher Aristotle (384–322 BC), who grouped living things as either plants or animals, based mainly on their ability to move. He distinguished animals with blood from animals without blood, which can be compared with the concepts of vertebrates and invertebrates respectively, and divided the blooded animals into five groups: viviparous quadrupeds (mammals), oviparous quadrupeds (reptiles and amphibians), birds, fishes and whales. The bloodless animals were divided into five groups: cephalopods, crustaceans, insects (which included the spiders, scorpions, and centipedes), shelled animals (such as most molluscs and echinoderms), and zoophytes (animals that resembled plants). This theory remained dominant for more than a thousand years.

=== Eastern philosophy ===
In ancient Indian medicine (Ayurveda), the Sushruta Samhita classified substances into sthavara ("immobile"), of plant or mineral origin, and jangama ("mobile" or animate), of animal origin. It subdivided plants into categories such as vriksha (fruit- and flower-bearing trees) and virudha (creepers and shrubs). The companion Charaka Samhita used a comparable three-way division of sthavara, jangama, and artificial (samyogaja) categories.

In ancient China, the Erya, the oldest surviving Chinese dictionary, possibly assembled during the Qin or early Han dynasty from material dating to the Zhou dynasty, organises its entries into 19 semantic categories, including separate sections on grasses, trees, insects, fish, birds, and beasts. Later Chinese materia medica works, culminating in Li Shizhen's Bencao Gangmu (1578), organised substances by medicinal use into plant-associated and animal-associated categories.

=== Linnaean ===
In the late 1740s, Carl Linnaeus introduced his system of binomial nomenclature for the classification of species. Linnaeus attempted to improve the composition and reduce the length of the previously used many-worded names by abolishing unnecessary rhetoric, introducing new descriptive terms and precisely defining their meaning.

The fungi were originally treated as plants. For a short period, Linnaeus had classified them in the taxon Vermes in Animalia, but later placed them back in Plantae. Herbert Copeland classified the Fungi in his Protoctista, including them with single-celled organisms and thus partially avoiding the problem but acknowledging their special status. The problem was eventually solved by Whittaker, when he gave them their own kingdom in his five-kingdom system. Evolutionary history shows that the fungi are more closely related to animals than to plants.

As advances in microscopy enabled detailed study of cells and microorganisms, new groups of life were revealed, and the fields of cell biology and microbiology were created. These new organisms were originally described separately in protozoa as animals and protophyta/thallophyta as plants, but were united by Ernst Haeckel in the kingdom Protista; later, the prokaryotes were split off in the kingdom Monera, which would eventually be divided into two separate groups, the Bacteria and the Archaea. This led to the six-kingdom system and eventually to the current three-domain system, which is based on evolutionary relationships. However, the classification of eukaryotes, especially of protists, is still controversial.

As microbiology developed, viruses, which are non-cellular, were discovered. Whether these are considered alive has been a matter of debate; viruses lack characteristics of life such as cell membranes, metabolism and the ability to grow or respond to their environments. Viruses have been classed into "species" based on their genetics, but many aspects of such a classification remain controversial.

The original Linnaean system has been modified many times, for example as follows:

Linnaeus 1735	Haeckel 1866	Chatton 1925	Copeland 1938	Whittaker 1969	Woese et al. 1990	Cavalier-Smith 1998, 2015
2 kingdoms	3 kingdoms	2 empires	4 kingdoms	5 kingdoms	3 domains	2 empires, 6/7 kingdoms
(not treated)	Protista	Prokaryota	Monera	Monera	Bacteria	Bacteria
(not treated)	Protista	Prokaryota	Monera	Monera	Archaea	Archaea (2015)
(not treated)	Protista	Eukaryota	Protoctista	Protista	Eucarya	Protozoa*
(not treated)	Protista	Eukaryota	Protoctista	Protista	Eucarya	Chromista*
Vegetabilia	Plantae	Eukaryota	Plantae	Plantae	Eucarya	Plantae
Vegetabilia	Plantae	Eukaryota	Plantae	Fungi	Eucarya	Fungi
Animalia	Animalia	Eukaryota	Animalia	Animalia	Eucarya	Animalia	*Not a clade.

The attempt to organise the eukaryotes into a small number of kingdoms has been challenged. The Protozoa do not form a clade or natural grouping, nor do the Chromista (Chromalveolata).

=== Metagenomic ===
The ability to sequence large numbers of complete genomes has allowed biologists to take a metagenomic view of the phylogeny of the whole tree of life. This has led to the realisation that the majority of living things are bacteria, and that all have a common origin.

Phylogenetic tree based on rRNA gene data (Woese et al., 1990) showing the 3 life domains, with the last universal common ancestor (LUCA) at its root

A 2016 metagenomic representation of the tree of life, unrooted, using ribosomal protein sequences. Bacteria are at the top (left and right); Archaea at bottom; Eukaryotes in green at bottom right.

== Composition ==
=== Chemical elements ===
All life forms require certain core chemical elements for their biochemical functioning. These include carbon, hydrogen, nitrogen, oxygen, phosphorus, and sulfur—the elemental macronutrients for all organisms. Together these make up nucleic acids, proteins and lipids, the bulk of living matter. Five of these six elements comprise the chemical components of DNA, the exception being sulfur. The latter is a component of the amino acids cysteine and methionine. The most abundant of these elements in organisms is carbon, which has the desirable attribute of forming multiple, stable covalent bonds. This allows carbon-based (organic) molecules to form the immense variety of chemical arrangements described in organic chemistry. Alternative hypothetical types of biochemistry have been proposed that eliminate one or more of these elements, swap out an element for one not on the list, or change required chiralities or other chemical properties.

=== DNA ===
Deoxyribonucleic acid (DNA) is a molecule that carries most of the genetic instructions used in the growth, development, functioning and reproduction of all known living organisms and many viruses. DNA and RNA are nucleic acids; alongside proteins and complex carbohydrates, they are one of the three major types of macromolecules that are essential for all known forms of life. Most DNA molecules consist of two biopolymer strands coiled around each other to form a double helix. The two DNA strands are known as polynucleotides since they are composed of simpler units called nucleotides. Each nucleotide is composed of a nitrogen-containing nucleobase—either cytosine (C), guanine (G), adenine (A), or thymine (T)—as well as a sugar called deoxyribose and a phosphate group.

The nucleotides are joined to one another in a chain by covalent bonds between the sugar of one nucleotide and the phosphate of the next, resulting in an alternating sugar-phosphate backbone. According to base pairing rules (A with T, and C with G), hydrogen bonds bind the nitrogenous bases of the two separate polynucleotide strands to make double-stranded DNA. This has the key property that each strand contains all the information needed to recreate the other strand, enabling the information to be preserved during reproduction and cell division. Within cells, DNA is organised into long structures called chromosomes. During cell division, these chromosomes are duplicated in the process of DNA replication, providing each cell its own complete set of chromosomes. Eukaryotes store most of their DNA inside the cell nucleus.

=== Cells ===
Cells are the basic unit of structure in every living thing, and all cells arise from pre-existing cells by division. Cell theory was formulated by Henri Dutrochet, Theodor Schwann, Rudolf Virchow and others during the early nineteenth century, and subsequently became widely accepted. The activity of an organism depends on the total activity of its cells, with energy flow occurring within and between them. Cells contain hereditary information that is carried forward as a genetic code during cell division.

There are two primary types of cells, reflecting their evolutionary origins. Prokaryotic cells lack a nucleus and other membrane-bound organelles, although they have circular DNA and ribosomes. Bacteria and Archaea are two domains of prokaryotes. The other primary type is the eukaryotic cell, which has a distinct nucleus bound by a nuclear membrane and membrane-bound organelles, including mitochondria, chloroplasts, lysosomes, rough and smooth endoplasmic reticulum, and vacuoles. In addition, their DNA is organised into chromosomes. All species of large complex organisms are eukaryotes, including animals, plants and fungi, though with a wide diversity of protist microorganisms. The conventional model is that eukaryotes evolved from prokaryotes, with the main organelles of the eukaryotes forming through endosymbiosis between bacteria and the progenitor eukaryotic cell.

The molecular mechanisms of cell biology are based on proteins. Most of these are synthesised by the ribosomes through an enzyme-catalysed process called protein biosynthesis. A sequence of amino acids is assembled and joined based upon gene expression of the cell's nucleic acid. In eukaryotic cells, these proteins may then be transported and processed through the Golgi apparatus in preparation for dispatch to their destination.

Cells reproduce through a process of cell division in which the parent cell divides into two or more daughter cells. For prokaryotes, cell division occurs through a process of fission in which the DNA is replicated, then the two copies are attached to parts of the cell membrane. In eukaryotes, a more complex process of mitosis is followed. However, the result is the same; the resulting cell copies are identical to each other and to the original cell (except for mutations), and both are capable of further division following an interphase period. Most species of multicellular plants, animals and fungi as well as many protists are capable of sexual reproduction. Sexual reproduction, involving a meiotic process, is considered to have arisen very early in the evolution of eukaryotes.

=== Multicellular structure ===
Multicellular organisms may have first evolved through the formation of colonies of identical cells. These cells can form group organisms through cell adhesion. The individual members of a colony are capable of surviving on their own, whereas the members of a true multicellular organism have developed specialisations, making them dependent on the remainder of the organism for survival. Such organisms are formed clonally or from a single germ cell that is capable of forming the various specialised cells that form the adult organism. This specialisation allows multicellular organisms to exploit resources more efficiently than single cells. About 800 million years ago, a minor genetic change in a single molecule, the enzyme GK-PID, may have allowed organisms to go from a single-cell organism to one of many cells.

Cells have evolved methods to perceive and respond to their microenvironment, thereby enhancing their adaptability. Cell signalling coordinates cellular activities, and hence governs the basic functions of multicellular organisms. Signalling between cells can occur through direct cell contact using juxtacrine signalling, or indirectly through the exchange of agents as in the endocrine system. In more complex organisms, coordination of activities can occur through a dedicated nervous system.

== In the universe ==
Though life is confirmed only on Earth, many think that extraterrestrial life is not only plausible, but probable or inevitable, possibly resulting in a biophysical cosmology instead of a mere physical cosmology. Other planets and moons in the Solar System and other planetary systems are being examined for evidence of having once supported simple life, and projects such as the search for extraterrestrial intelligence (SETI) are trying to detect radio transmissions from possible alien civilisations. Other locations within the Solar System that may host microbial life include the subsurface of Mars, the upper atmosphere of Venus, and subsurface oceans on some of the moons of the giant planets.

Investigation of the tenacity and versatility of life on Earth, as well as an understanding of the molecular systems that some organisms utilise to survive such extremes, is important for the search for extraterrestrial life. For example, lichen could survive for a month in a simulated Martian environment.

Beyond the Solar System, the region around another main-sequence star that could support Earth-like life on an Earth-like planet is known as the habitable zone. The inner and outer radii of this zone vary with the luminosity of the star, as does the time interval during which the zone survives. Stars more massive than the Sun have a larger habitable zone, but remain on the Sun-like "main sequence" of stellar evolution for a shorter time interval. Small red dwarfs have the opposite problem, with a smaller habitable zone that is subject to higher levels of magnetic activity and the effects of tidal locking from close orbits. Hence, stars in the intermediate mass range such as the Sun may have a greater likelihood for Earth-like life to develop.

The location of the star within a galaxy may also affect the likelihood of life forming. Stars in regions with a greater abundance of heavier elements that can form planets, in combination with a low rate of potentially habitat-damaging supernova events, are predicted to have a higher probability of hosting planets with complex life. The variables of the Drake equation are used to discuss the conditions in planetary systems where civilisation is most likely to exist, within wide bounds of uncertainty. A "Confidence of Life Detection" scale (CoLD) for reporting evidence of life beyond Earth has been proposed.

== Artificial ==
Artificial life is the simulation of any aspect of life, as through computers, robotics, or biochemistry. Synthetic biology is a new area of biotechnology that combines science and biological engineering. The common goal is the design and construction of new biological functions and systems not found in nature. Synthetic biology includes the broad redefinition and expansion of biotechnology, with the ultimate goals of being able to design and build engineered biological systems that process information, manipulate chemicals, fabricate materials and structures, produce energy, provide food, and maintain and enhance human health and the environment.

== See also ==
- Biology, the study of life
- Biosignature
- Carbon-based life
- Central dogma of molecular biology
- History of life
- Lists of organisms by population
- Viable system theory
