= Deinococcus apachensis =

Scientific classification
- Domain: Bacteria
- Kingdom: Thermotogati
- Phylum: Deinococcota
- Class: Deinococci
- Order: Deinococcales
- Family: Deinococcaceae
- Genus: Deinococcus
- Species: D. apachensis

Binomial name
- Deinococcus apachensis Rainey and da Costa 2005

Species of bacterium

Deinococcus apachensis is a species of bacteria in the phylum Deinococcota. Strains of this species were isolated from soil samples from Arizona after exposure to more than 15 kGy of radiation.
