= Deinococcus murrayi =

Scientific classification
- Domain: Bacteria
- Kingdom: Thermotogati
- Phylum: Deinococcota
- Class: Deinococci
- Order: Deinococcales
- Family: Deinococcaceae
- Genus: Deinococcus
- Species: D. murrayi

Binomial name
- Deinococcus murrayi Ferreira et al. 1997

Species of bacterium

Deinococcus murrayi is a bacterium. It produces orange-pigmented colonies and has an optimum growth temperature of about 45 °C (113 °F) to 50 °C (122 °F). It is extremely gamma radiation-resistant. Its type strain is ALT-1b (= DSM 11303).
