= Oregon Agricultural Experiment Station =

Oregon State University-affiliated research organization

Coordinates: 44°33′56.4″N 123°16′38.1″W

General information
- Type: Research institute

Website
- agsci.oregonstate.edu/research/research-college-agricultural-sciences

Oregon Agricultural Experiment Station (OAES) is affiliated with Oregon State University and coordinates research at experiment stations in Oregon. It receives state funding and funding from contracts for its work. It has 11 branch stations. It was established in 1887 after passage of the Hatch Act of 1887 and began at Oregon Agricultural College in 1888. It publishes a station bulletin. It also produced films and public service announcements. Rural homemaking practices were studied when female researchers were added to the organization. Publication topics have included studies on soils, pests, and crops.

Edgar Grimm was the first director.

The first branch station opened in Union, Oregon in 1901. The historic Red Barn was built in 1914 at the experiment station in Union, Oregon.

Deinococcus radiodurans was discovered at the experiment station in Corvallis.

== Branch experiment stations ==
- Eastern Oregon Agricultural Research Center in Union
- Malheur Agricultural Experiment Station in Malheur
- Southern Oregon Research and Extension Center (SOREC) in Central Point
- Hermiston Agricultural Research and Extension Center in Hermiston
- North Willamette Research & Extension Center in Aurora
- Mid-Columbia Agricultural Research & Extension Center in Hood River
- Columbia Basin Agricultural Research Center (CBARC) in Pendleton
- Ontario
- Eastern Oregon Agricultural Research Center in Burns
- Madras
- Klamath Basin Research and Extension Center in Klamath Falls
- Coastal Oregon Marine Experiment Station in Astoria
- Portland, Food Innovation Center

=== Former ===
- John Jacob Astor Experiment Station (closed 1972)
- Harney Branch Station, (closed 1954)
- Pendleton Experiment Station and Sherman Experiment Station (merged to form CBARC)
- Central Oregon Agricultural Research & Extension Center in Powell Butte, sold in 2018
- Red Soils Experiment Station (Oregon City, Oregon, 1939-1964)

== See also ==
- Eugene Science Center
