= Deinococcus indicus =

Scientific classification
- Domain: Bacteria
- Kingdom: Thermotogati
- Phylum: Deinococcota
- Class: Deinococci
- Order: Deinococcales
- Family: Deinococcaceae
- Genus: Deinococcus
- Species: D. indicus

Binomial name
- Deinococcus indicus Suresh et al. 2004

Species of bacterium

Deinococcus indicus is a species of arsenic-resistant bacterium. It is Gram-negative, rod-shaped, non-motile, non-sporulating and red-pigmented, with type strain Wt/1a^{T} (=MTCC 4913^{T} =DSM 15307^{T}).
