= Herbert Copeland (biologist) =

American biologist

Herbert Faulkner Copeland
- Born: May 21, 1902; Chicago, Illinois
- Died: October 15, 1968 (aged 66)
- Known for: biological kingdoms, esp. Monera
- Scientific career
- Author abbrev. (botany): H.F.Copel.

Herbert Faulkner Copeland (May 21, 1902 – October 15, 1968) was an American biologist who contributed to the theory of biological kingdoms. He grouped unicellular organisms into two large kingdoms: the Monera kingdom and the Protista kingdom. In 1966, he included bacteria and one of the most primitive algae, called blue green algae, under Monera kingdom.

His father was Edwin Copeland who was also the founder of the College of Agriculture at the University of the Philippines Los Banos and a leading pteridologist.

== Bibliography ==
- "The kingdoms of organisms", Quarterly review of biology v.13, pp. 383–420, 1938.
- The classification of lower organisms, Palo Alto, Calif., Pacific Books, 1956.
