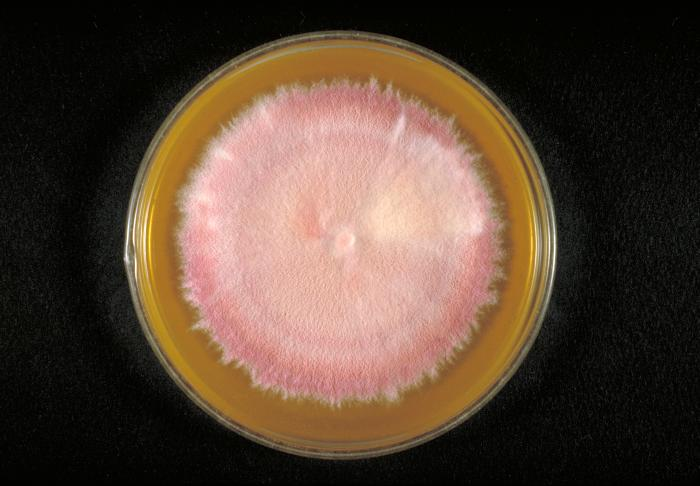
- This Sabouraud’s dextrose agar plate culture is growing T. terrestre fungus, strain x231 producing a red pigment

Scientific classification
- Kingdom: Fungi
- Division: Ascomycota
- Class: Eurotiomycetes
- Order: Onygenales
- Family: Arthrodermataceae
- Genus: Trichophyton
- Species: T. terrestre

Binomial name
- Trichophyton terrestre Durie & D. Frey

Synonyms
- Trichophyton terrestre-primum Szathmáry

= Trichophyton terrestre =

Species of fungus

Trichophyton terrestre is a fungus of the genus Trichophyton.

== History and taxonomy ==
- first found in County of Cumberland, New South Wales, Australia.
- branched under the Trichophyton genus, the fungi was further found to be a complex in its teleomorph stage comprising multiple species, for instance, the Arthroderma insigulare, sp.nov. and Arthroderma olidum sp. nov.
- furthermore, the fungi displayed typical feature of Trichophyton which spread nodules and conidial structures in a spiral fashion.
- with a keratinophilic and keratinolytic nature, they were often identified on hair cells of mammals and possibly fed on keratin-like substrate.

== Growth and morphology ==
- moderate growth speed, yellow colonies
