= Deinococcus saxicola =

Scientific classification
- Domain: Bacteria
- Kingdom: Thermotogati
- Phylum: Deinococcota
- Class: Deinococci
- Order: Deinococcales
- Family: Deinococcaceae
- Genus: Deinococcus
- Species: D. saxicola

Binomial name
- Deinococcus saxicola Hirsch et al. 2006

Species of bacterium

Deinococcus saxicola is a species of low temperature and drought-tolerating, UV-resistant bacteria from Antarctica. It is Gram-positive, non-motile and coccoid-shaped. Its type strain is AA-1444^{T} (DSM 15974^{T}).
