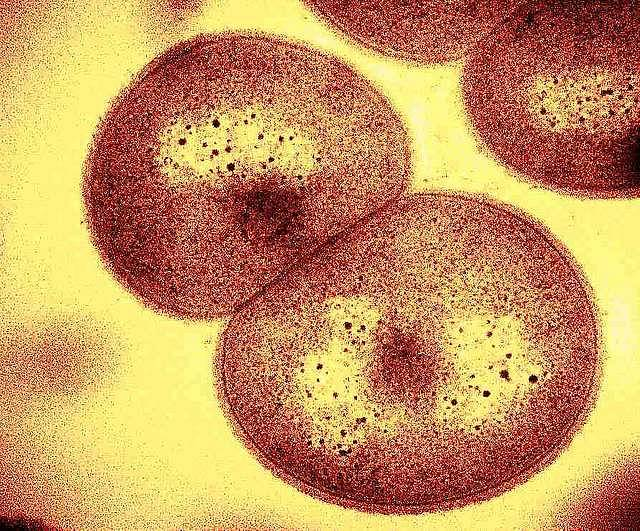

Scientific classification
- Domain: Bacteria
- Kingdom: Thermotogati
- Phylum: Deinococcota
- Class: Deinococci
- Order: Deinococcales
- Family: Deinococcaceae
- Genus: Deinococcus
- Species: D. geothermalis

Binomial name
- Deinococcus geothermalis Ferreira et al. 1997

= Deinococcus geothermalis =

Species of bacterium

Deinococcus geothermalis is a non-pathogenic, sphere-shaped, Gram-positive, heterotrophic bacterium, where geothermalis means 'hot earth' or 'hot springs'. This bacterium was first obtained from the hot springs of Agnano, Naples, Italy and São Pedro do Sul, Portugal. It resides primarily in hot springs and in deep ocean environments.

== Etymology ==
The genus name Deinococcus comes from Ancient Greek δεινός (deinós), meaning "terrible", and κόκκος (kókkos), meaning "berry". The specific epithet geothermalis comes from Ancient Greek γεω- (geo-), meaning "earth", and θερμός (thermós), meaning "warm".

== Genome Structure ==
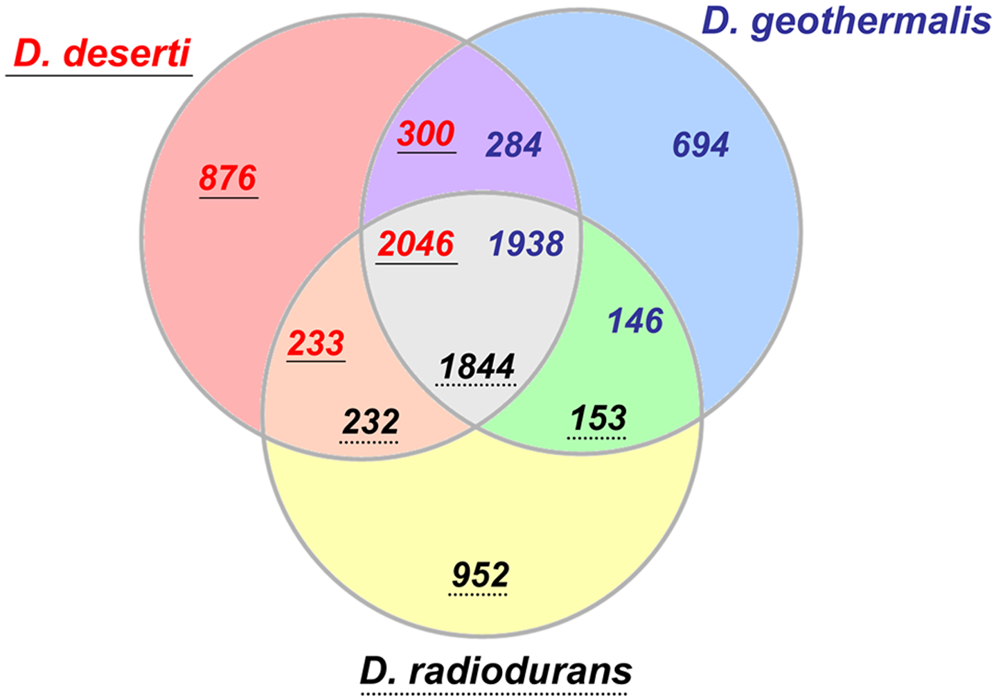
Comparative of the genomes found in the genus, Deinococcus

Deinococcus geothermalis has a genome that contains 2.47 Mbp with 2,335 protein coding genes. There are 73 insertion sequences (IS) contained in the genome, with 19 different types of ISs'. Upon oxidative stress these ISs' are actively transposed in the bacterium. Additionally, it carries at least 2 plasmids.

== Growth Characteristics ==
Deniococcus geothermalis form tetrads when dividing. The size range of their cells is around 1.2–2 μm in diameter. It produces orange-pigmented colonies and has an optimum growth temperature of about 45–50 °C (113–122 °F), which is the limit between mesophile and thermophile organisms, and is roughly neutrophile with an optimum pH of 6.5. Given all this, they are able to grow in environments where nutrients are limited and can even use ammonium sulfate for biomass accumulation. It is extremely gamma radiation-resistant. Mn(II) concentrations are high in the cell. Fe(III)-nitrilotriacetic acid, U(V), and Cr(VI) can all be reduced by D. geothermalis, which has also been engineered to reduce Hg(II) as well, from a plasmid originally constructed for Deinococcus radiodurans. Its type strain is AG-3a (= DSM 11300).

== Biofilm Formation ==
It is able to form thick biofilms on non-living surfaces, such as printing machines, glass, stainless steel, polystyrenes, polyethylene, etc., which are characterized by adhesion threads and lack of a slime matrix. Biofilms were visualized with high resolution field-emission scanning electron microscopy and atomic force microscopy (AMF). In particular, Deniococcus geothermalis biofilms on printing equipment can help other bacteria form biofilms on top of the existing one, referred to as a secondary biofilm bacterium. Their biofilms are tightly adhered to surfaces, making them hard to remove. They do not possess any means of motility and/or attachment, like a pili or flagella. Attachment is assisted by extracellular polymeric substances (EPS) with adhesion being mixed on the surface of the cell, rather than uniformly spread. Despite its strong attachment to a surface, the biofilms of unsecured attached cells can move in water.

== Oxidative Stress ==
In an environment lacking manganese (under aerobic conditions), Deniococcus geothermalis cells will undergo oxidative stress. It is proposed that in this lack, D. geothermalis prefers to utilize any available carbon for metabolism that reduces oxidative stress or reactive oxygen species (ROS). Additionally, there are protein repair enzymes that the bacterium can use to combat oxidative stress, as well as up-regulating catalase and superoxide dismutase. Along these lines, NADPH is used over NADH upon carbon accumulation.

== Bioremediation ==
Many toxic waste sites have contaminates that are protected by high heat. Due to the organism's reduction of radioactive materials and ability to withstand high temperatures, it has been proposed they be utilized in bioremediation efforts against toxic habitats. It has an advantage over the closely related, Deinococcus radiodurans, in particular when dealing with waste environments, because its optimum growth temperature is higher, versus D. radiodurans, which is around 39 °C.

== Resistance in Harsh Environments ==
A space mission called EXPOSE-R2 was launched on 24 July 2014 aboard the Russian Progress M-23M, and was attached on 18 August 2014 outside the ISS on the Russian module Zvezda. The two main experiments will test the resistance of a variety of extremophile microorganisms biofilms and planktonic cells, including Deinococcus geothermalis to long-term exposure to outer space and to a Mars simulated environment. In particular, they were interested in finding if the biofilms of extremophiles were able to survive in the rough conditions of outer space and/or any other parts of the universe. After 2 years, the mission was able to reveal that D. geothermalis biofilms and planktonic cells survived desiccation, UV radiation, and harsh Mars-like conditions.
