= Peter Hirsch (microbiologist) =

German microbiologist (born 1928)

Peter Hirsch (born 1928 in Plön) is a German microbiologist who received his doctorate from the University of Hamburg. After spending nine years in the US he was asked to found an Institute of General Microbiology at Kiel University. He has made many contributions to the study of microbiology. The genus Hirschia, a type of hyphal bacteria, is named after him.
