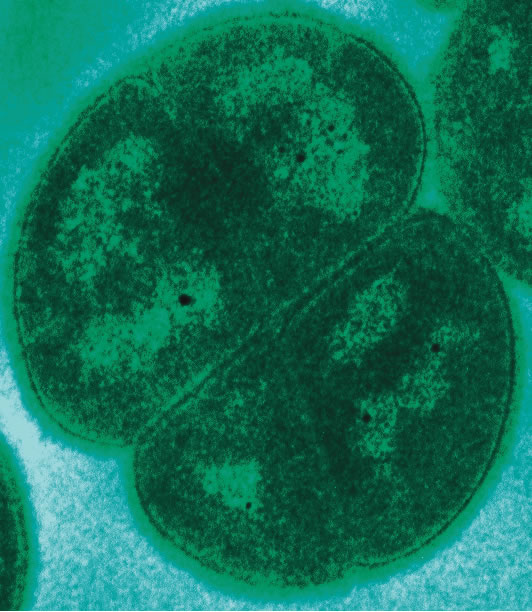
- A tetrad of D. radiodurans

Scientific classification
- Domain: Bacteria
- Kingdom: Thermotogati
- Phylum: Deinococcota
- Class: Deinococci
- Order: Deinococcales
- Family: Deinococcaceae
- Genus: Deinococcus
- Species: D. radiodurans

Binomial name
- Deinococcus radiodurans Brooks & Murray, 1981

= Deinococcus radiodurans =

Extremophile species of bacterium

Deinococcus radiodurans is a bacterium, an extremophile and one of the most radiation-resistant organisms known. It can survive cold, dehydration, vacuum, and acid, and therefore is known as a polyextremophile. The Guinness Book Of World Records listed it in January 1998 as the world's most radiation-resistant bacterium and most radiation-resistant lifeform.

Several bacteria of comparable radioresistance are known, including some species of the genus Chroococcidiopsis (phylum cyanobacteria) and some species of Rubrobacter (phylum Actinomycetota); among the archaea, the species Thermococcus gammatolerans shows comparable radioresistance.

== Name and classification ==
The genus name Deinococcus comes from Ancient Greek δεινός (deinós), meaning "terrible", and κόκκος (kókkos), meaning "berry". The specific epithet radiodurans comes from radius and durare, meaning "radiation" and "surviving" respectively. The species was formerly called Micrococcus radiodurans. As a consequence of its hardiness, it has been nicknamed "Conan the Bacterium", in reference to Conan the Barbarian.

Initially, it was placed in the genus Micrococcus. After evaluation of ribosomal RNA sequences and other evidence, it was placed in its own genus Deinococcus, which is closely related to the genus Thermus.

Deinococcus is one genus of three in the order Deinococcales. D. radiodurans is the type species of this genus, and the best studied member. All known members of the genus are radioresistant: D. proteolyticus, D. radiopugnans, D. radiophilus, D. grandis, D. indicus, D. frigens, D. saxicola, D. marmoris, D. deserti, D. geothermalis, and D. murrayi; the latter two are also thermophilic.

== History ==
D. radiodurans was discovered in 1956 by Arthur Anderson at the Oregon Agricultural Experiment Station in Corvallis, Oregon. Experiments were being performed to determine whether canned food could be sterilized using high doses of gamma radiation. A tin of meat was exposed to a dose of radiation that was thought to kill all known forms of life, but the meat subsequently spoiled, and D. radiodurans was isolated.

The complete DNA sequence of D. radiodurans was published in 1999 by The Institute for Genomic Research. A detailed annotation and analysis of the genome appeared in 2001. The genome is found in four parts: two chromosomes sized 2.65 Mbp and 412 kbp, one megaplasmid of 177 kbp, and one regular-sized plasmid of 46 kbp. The sequenced strain was ATCC BAA-816.

In August 2020, scientists reported that bacteria from Earth, particularly Deinococcus radiodurans bacteria, were found to survive for three years in outer space, based on studies conducted on the International Space Station (ISS). These findings support the notion of panspermia, the hypothesis that life exists throughout the Universe, distributed in various ways, including space dust, meteoroids, asteroids, comets, planetoids, or contaminated spacecraft.

== Description ==
D. radiodurans is a rather large, spherical bacterium, with a diameter of 1.5 to 3.5 μm. Four cells normally stick together, forming a tetrad. The bacteria are easily cultured and do not appear to cause disease. Under controlled growth conditions, cells of dimer, tetramer, and even multimer morphologies can be obtained. Colonies are smooth, convex, and pink to red in color. The cells stain Gram positive, although its cell envelope is unusual and is reminiscent of the cell walls of Gram negative bacteria.

Deinococcus radiodurans does not form endospores and is nonmotile. It is an obligate aerobic chemoorganoheterotroph, i.e., it uses oxygen to derive energy from organic compounds in its environment. It is often found in habitats rich in organic materials, such as sewage, meat, feces, or, soil, but has also been isolated from medical instruments, room dust, textiles, and dried foods.

It is extremely resistant to ionizing radiation, ultraviolet light, desiccation, and oxidizing and electrophilic agents.

PCR assays and fluorescent in situ hybridization (FISH) techniques can be used to test for D. radiodurans in nature.

Its genome consists of two circular chromosomes, one 2.65 million base pairs long and the other 412,000 base pairs long, as well as a megaplasmid of 177,000 base pairs and a plasmid of 46,000 base pairs. It has approximately 3,195 genes. In its stationary phase, each bacterial cell contains four copies of this genome; when rapidly multiplying, each bacterium contains 8-10 copies of the genome.

== Ionizing-radiation resistance ==
Deinococcus radiodurans is capable of withstanding an acute dose of 5,000 grays (Gy), or 500,000 rad, of ionizing radiation with almost no loss of viability, and an acute dose of 12,000 grays with 10% survivability. A dose of 5,000 Gy is estimated to introduce several dozens double-strand breaks (DSBs) into the organism's DNA: given the estimated rate of 0.005 DSB/Gy/Mbp, the approximately 3.2 Mbp bacterial genome should have received 80 DSBs if it was haploid. For comparison, a chest X-ray or Apollo mission involves about 1 mGy, 5 Gy can kill a human, 200–800 Gy will kill E. coli, and more than 4,000 Gy will kill the radiation-resistant tardigrade.

=== Mechanisms of ionizing-radiation resistance ===
==== DNA structure ====
Deinococcus accomplishes its resistance to radiation by having multiple copies of its genome. Scanning electron microscopy analysis has shown that DNA in D. radiodurans is organized into tightly packed toroids, which may facilitate DNA repair.

==== DNA repair ====
Deinococcus radiodurans has a unique quality in which it can repair both single- and double-stranded DNA. When damage is apparent to the cell, it brings the damaged DNA into a compartmental ring-like structure where the DNA is repaired, and then is able to fuse the nucleoids from the outside of the compartment with the damaged DNA.

Deinococcus usually repairs breaks in its chromosomes within 12–24 hours by a 2-step process.

- First, D. radiodurans reconnects some chromosome fragments by a process called single-stranded annealing. This is facilitated having multiple copies of the genome, and as few as two copies can perform annealing. Partially overlapping fragments are then used for synthesis of homologous regions through a moving D-loop that can continue extension until the fragments find complementary partner strands.
- In the second step, multiple proteins mend double-strand breaks through homologous recombination. RecA performs chromosomal crossover across multiple copies of the (possibly partial) genome to generate complete copies.

Deinococcus radiodurans is capable of genetic transformation, a process by which DNA derived from one cell can be taken up by another cell and integrated into the recipient genome by homologous recombination. This may help if the DNA in a single cell is insufficient for repair into a complete chromosome. Natural genetic transformation under stressful conditions in D. radiodurans is associated with repair of DNA damage. When DNA damages (e.g. pyrimidine dimers) are introduced into donor DNA by UV irradiation, the recipient cells efficiently repair the damages in the transforming DNA, as they do in cellular DNA, when the cells themselves are irradiated.

==== Additional protective mechanisms ====
Michael Daly has suggested the bacterium uses manganese complexes as antioxidants to protect itself against radiation damage. In 2007 his team showed that high intracellular levels of manganese(II) in D. radiodurans protect proteins from being oxidized by radiation, and they proposed the idea that "protein, rather than DNA, is the principal target of the biological action of [ionizing radiation] in sensitive bacteria, and extreme resistance in Mn-accumulating bacteria is based on protein protection". In 2016, Massimiliano Peana et al. reported a spectroscopic study through NMR, EPR, and ESI-MS techniques on the Mn(II) interaction with two peptides, DP1 (DEHGTAVMLK) and DP2 (THMVLAKGED), whose amino acid composition was selected to include the majority of the most prevalent amino acids present in a Deinococcus radiodurans bacterium cell-free extract that contains components capable of conferring extreme resistance to ionizing radiation. In 2018, M. Peana and C. Chasapis reported by a combined approach of bioinformatic strategies based on structural data and annotation, the Mn(II)-binding proteins encoded by the genome of DR and proposed a model for manganese interaction with the DR proteome network involved in ROS response and defense.

In 2009, nitric oxide was reported to play an important role in the bacteria's recovery from radiation exposure: the gas is required for division and proliferation after DNA damage has been repaired. A gene was described that increases nitric oxide production after UV radiation, and in the absence of this gene, the bacteria were still able to repair DNA damage, but would not grow.

A few more mechanisms (LEA and SDBC) are described in the following section.

=== Evolution of ionizing-radiation resistance ===
A persistent question regarding D. radiodurans is how such a high degree of radioresistance could evolve. Natural background radiation levels are very low—in most places, on the order of 0.4 mGy per year, and the highest known background radiation, near Ramsar, Iran, is only 260 mGy per year. With naturally occurring background radiation levels so low, organisms evolving mechanisms specifically to ward off the effects of high radiation are unlikely. In the distant geological past, higher background radiation existed both due to more primordial radionuclides not yet having decayed and due to the effects of things like the natural nuclear fission reactors at Oklo, Gabon, which were active some 1.7 billion years ago. However, even if adaptations to such conditions did evolve during that time, genetic drift would almost certainly have eliminated them if they provided no (other) evolutionary benefit.

A team of Russian and American scientists proposed that the radioresistance of D. radiodurans had a Martian origin. They suggested that evolution of the microorganism could have taken place on the Martian surface until it was delivered to Earth on a meteorite. However, apart from its resistance to radiation, Deinococcus is genetically and biochemically very similar to other terrestrial life forms, arguing against a unique extraterrestrial origin.

Valerie Mattimore of Louisiana State University has suggested the radioresistance of D. radiodurans is simply a side effect of a mechanism for dealing with prolonged cellular desiccation (dryness). To support this hypothesis, she performed an experiment in which she demonstrated that mutant strains of D. radiodurans that are highly susceptible to damage from ionizing radiation are also highly susceptible to damage from prolonged desiccation, while the wild-type strain is resistant to both. It was also shown that desiccation induces double-stranded DNA breaks with patterns similar to extreme ionizing radiation. In addition to DNA repair, D. radiodurans use LEA proteins (late embryogenesis abundant proteins) expression to protect against desiccation.

In this context, the robust cell envelope of D. radiodurans, through its main protein complex, the S-layer deinoxanthin binding complex (SDBC), strongly contributes to both its physiological functions and its extreme radioresistance. This protein complex acts as a shield against electromagnetic stress, such as ionizing radiation exposure, and also stabilizes the cell envelope against high temperatures and desiccation.

== Applications ==
Deinococcus radiodurans as a model system for studying the cell cycle

Deinococcus radiodurans has been shown to have a great potential to be used in different fields of investigation. Not only has D. radiodurans been genetically modified for bioremediation applications, but it has also been discovered that it could perform a major role in biomedical research and in nanotechnology.

Bioremediation refers to any process that uses microorganisms, fungi, plants, or the enzymes derived from them, to return an environment altered by contaminants to its natural condition. Large areas of soils, sediments, and groundwater are contaminated with radionuclides, heavy metals, and toxic solvents. There are microorganisms that are able to decontaminate soils with heavy metals by immobilizing them, but in the case of nuclear waste, ionizing radiation limits the amount of microorganisms that can be useful. In this sense, D. radiodurans, due to its characteristics, can be used for the treatment of nuclear energy waste. Deinococcus radiodurans has been genetically engineered to consume and digest solvents and heavy metals in these radioactive environments. The mercuric reductase gene has been cloned from Escherichia coli into Deinococcus to detoxify the ionic mercury residue frequently found in radioactive waste generated from nuclear weapons manufacture. Researchers developed a strain of Deinococcus that could detoxify both mercury and toluene in mixed radioactive wastes. Moreover, a gene encoding a non-specific acid phosphatase from Salmonella enterica, serovar Typhi, and the alkaline phosphatase gene from Sphingomonas have been introduced in strains of D. radiodurans for the bioprecipitation of uranium in acid and alkaline solutions, respectively.

In the biomedical field, Deinococcus radiodurans could be used as a model to study the processes that lead to aging and cancer. The main causes of these physiological changes are related to the damage in DNA, RNA, and proteins resulting from oxidative stress, the weakening of antioxidant defense, and the inability of repair mechanisms to deal with the damage originated by reactive oxygen species, also known as ROS. To this extent, D. radiodurans mechanisms of protection against oxidative damage and of DNA reparation could be the starting points in research aimed to develop medical procedures to prevent aging and cancer. Some lines of investigation are focused on the application of D. radiodurans antioxidant systems in human cells to prevent ROS damaging and the study of the development of resistance to radiation in tumoral cells.

A nanotechnological application of D. radiodurans in the synthesis of silver and gold nanoparticles has also been described. Whereas chemical and physical methods to produce these nanoparticles are expensive and generate a huge amount of pollutants, biosynthetic processes represent an ecofriendly and cheaper alternative. The importance of these nanoparticles relies on their medical applications as they have been demonstrated to exhibit activity against pathogenic bacteria, antifouling effects, and cytotoxicity to tumoral cells.

Moreover, there are other uncommon applications of Deinococcus radiodurans. The Craig Venter Institute has used a system derived from the rapid DNA repair mechanisms of D. radiodurans to assemble synthetic DNA fragments into chromosomes, with the ultimate goal of producing a synthetic organism they call Mycoplasma laboratorium. In 2003, U.S. scientists demonstrated D. radiodurans could be used as a means of information storage that might survive a nuclear catastrophe. They translated the song "It's a Small World" into a series of DNA segments 150 base pairs long, inserted these into the bacteria, and were able to retrieve them without errors 100 bacterial generations later.

== Clues for future search for extremophile microbial life on Mars ==
When cultured and exposed to ionizing radiations in liquid media, Deinococcus radiodurans can survive up to 25 kGy. Horne et al. (2022) studied the effect of desiccation and freezing on the microbial survivability to ionizing radiation during feasibility studies of the return of Martian subsurface soil samples for microbial characterization, and for determining the most favorable landing sites of a future robotic exploration mission. They found that the desiccated and frozen cells could resist a 5.6x higher radiation dose: up to 140 kGy. They calculated that this would correspond to a theoretical survival time of 280 million years at a depth of 33 feet (10 m) below the Mars surface. However, this time scale is too short to allow microbial survival at a depth accessible to a rover equipped with a drilling system below the Martian surface when compared to the period when liquid water disappeared from the Martian surface (2–2.5 billion years ago). Nevertheless, Horne et al. consider the hypothesis that meteorite impacts could have dispersed Martian soil and locally heated the subsurface during the geological history of Mars. Sporadically heating the local environment, melting the frozen ice and perhaps giving a chance for a hypothetical distant Martian extremophile resembling its terrestrial cousin Deinococcus radiodurans to grow again for short moment before rapidly becoming frozen again and dormant for millions of years. So, to return subsurface soil samples from Mars for microbial characterization with a potentially "successful" mission like the European Rosalind Franklin rover, it would be necessary to target a relatively young impact crater to increase the chances of discovering dormant extremophile micro-organisms surviving in the dry and frozen Martian subsurface environment relatively protected from the lethal ionizing radiation.

== See also ==
- Extremophiles
- List of sequenced bacterial genomes
- Pyrococcus
- Radiosynthesis (metabolism)
- Radiotrophic fungus
- Thermococcus gammatolerans
