= List of sequenced bacterial genomes =

This list of sequenced eubacterial genomes contains most of the eubacteria known to have publicly available complete genome sequences. Most of these sequences have been placed in the International Nucleotide Sequence Database Collaboration, a public database which can be searched on the web. A few of the listed genomes may not be in the INSDC database, but in other public databases.

Genomes listed as "Unpublished" are in a database, but not in the peer-reviewed scientific literature.

For the genomes of archaea see list of sequenced archaeal genomes.

For the genomes of organelles with a bacterial origin, see list of sequenced mitochondrial genomes and list of sequenced plastomes

== Abditibacteriota ==
Species	Strain	Type	Base Pairs	Genes	Reference	GenBank Identifier
Abditibacterium utsteinense	LMG 29911	Abditibacteriota	3,606,330	3,240	2018	NZ_NIGF00000000.1

== Actinomycetota ==
Species	Strain	Type	Base Pairs	Genes	Reference	GenBank Identifier
Corynebacterium diphtheriae	C7 (beta)	Actinobacteridae	2,499,189		Unpublished	CP003210
Corynebacterium diphtheriae	PW8	Actinobacteridae	2,530,683		Unpublished	CP003216
Bifidobacterium longum	NCC2705	Actinobacteria	2,256,640	1,727	2002	
Corynebacterium diphtheriae	NCTC13129	Actinobacteria	2,488,635	2,320	2003	
Corynebacterium efficiens	YS314	Actinobacteria	3,147,090	2,942	2003	
Corynebacterium glutamicum	ATCC13032	Actinobacteria	3,309,401	3,099	Unpublished	
Corynebacterium jeikeium	K411	Actinobacteria	2,462,499	2,104	2005	
Frankia species	CcI3	Actinobacteria	5,433,628	4,499	Unpublished	
Mycobacterium avium	k10	Actinobacteria	4,829,781	4,350	2005	
Mycobacterium bovis	AF212297	Actinobacteria	4,345,492	3,953	2003	
Mycobacterium leprae	TN	Actinobacteria	3,268,203	2,720	2001	
Mycobacterium tuberculosis	CDC1551	Actinobacteria	4,403,837	4,189	Unpublished	
Mycobacterium tuberculosis	H37Rv	Actinobacteria	4,411,532	3,999	1998	
Nocardia farcinica	IFM10152	Actinobacteria	6,021,225	5,683	2004	
Streptomyces avermitilis	MA4680	Actinobacteria	9,025,608	7,577	2001	
Streptomyces coelicolor	A3	Actinobacteria	8,667,507	7,825	1996	
Symbiobacterium thermophilum	Strain	Actinobacteria	3,566,135	3,337	2004	
Thermobifida fusca	YX	Actinobacteria	3,642,249	3,110	Unpublished	

== Aquificota ==
Species	Strain	Type	Base Pairs	Genes	Reference	GenBank Identifier
Aquifex aeolicus	VF5	Aquificae	1,551,335	1,522	1998	Chromosome NC_000918 Plasmid ece1 NC_001880

== Bacteroidota/Chlorobiota group ==
Species	Strain	Type	Base Pairs	Genes	Reference	GenBank Identifier
Bacteroides fragilis	NCTC9343	Bacteroidota	5,205,140	4,260	2005	Chromosome CR626927 Plasmid pBF9343 CR626928
Bacteroides fragilis	YCH46	Bacteroidota	5,277,274	4,578	2004	Chromosome AP006841 Plasmid pBFY46 AP006842
Bacteroides thetaiotaomicron	VPI-5482	Bacteroidota	6,260,361	4,778	2003	Chromosome AE015928 Plasmid p5482 AY171301
Candidatus Amoebophilus asiaticus	5a2	Bacteroidota	1,884,364		2010	CP001102
Chlorobaculum parvum	NCIB 8327	Chlorobiota	2,289,249		DOE Joint Genome Institute	CP001099
Chlorobium chlorochromatii	CaD3	Chlorobiota	2,572,079	2,002	DOE Joint Genome Institute	CP000108
Chlorobium ferrooxidans	DSM 13031	Chlorobiota			DOE Joint Genome Institute	AASE00000000
Chlorobium limicola	DSM 245	Chlorobiota	2,763,181		DOE Joint Genome Institute	NC_010803
Chlorobium phaeobacteroides	BS1	Chlorobiota	2,736,403		DOE Joint Genome Institute	NC_010831
Chlorobium phaeobacteroides	DSM 266	Chlorobiota	3,133,902		DOE Joint Genome Institute	NC_008639
Chlorobium phaeovibrioides	DSM 265	Chlorobiota	1,966,858		DOE Joint Genome Institute	NC_009337
Chlorobium tepidum	TLS	Chlorobiota	2,154,946	2,255	2002	AE006470
Chloroherpeton thalassium	ATCC 35110	Chlorobiota	3,293,456		DOE Joint Genome Institute	CP001100
Cytophaga hutchinsonii	ATCC 33406	Chlorobiota	4,433,218		2007	CP000383
Haliscomenobacter hydrossis	DSM 1100	Bacteroidota	8,371,686		2011	Chromosome CP002691 Plasmid pHALHY01 CP002692; Plasmid pHALHY02 CP002693; Plasmid pHALHY03 CP002694
Ignavibacterium album	JCM 16511	Ignavibacteriota	3,658,997		University of Copenhagen	CP003418
Pelodictyon luteolum (Chlorobium luteolum)	DSM 273	Chlorobiota	2,364,842	2,083	DOE Joint Genome Institute	CP000096
Pelodictyon phaeoclathratiforme	BU-1	Chlorobiota	3,018,238		DOE Joint Genome Institute	CP001110
Porphyromonas gingivalis	ATCC 33277	Bacteroidota	2,354,886		2008	NC_010729
Porphyromonas gingivalis	W83	Bacteroidota	2,343,476	1,909	2003	NC_002950
Prosthecochloris aestuarii	DSM 271	Chlorobiota	2,512,923		DOE Joint Genome Institute	Chromosome CP001108 Plasmid pPAES01 CP001109
Salinibacter ruber	DSM 13855	Bacteroidota	3,551,823	2,801		NC_007677
Salinibacter ruber	M8	Bacteroidota	3,619,447			Chromosome FP565814 Plasmid pSR11 FP565810; Plasmid pSR56 FP565811; Plasmid pSR61 FP565812; Plasmid pSR84 NC_014157
Saprospira grandis	str. Lewin	Bacteroidota	4,345,237		University of Hawaii at Manoa	Chromosome CP002831 Plasmid CP002832

== Chlamydiota/Verrucomicrobiota group ==
Species	Strain	Type	Base Pairs	Genes	Reference
Akkermansia muciniphila	ATCC BAA-835	Verrucomicrobiota	2,664,102	2,176	
Akkermansia muciniphila	Urmite	Verrucomicrobiota	2,664,714	2,192	
Chlamydia muridarum	Nigg	Chlamydiota	1,072,950	904	
Chlamydia trachomatis	AHAR13	Chlamydiota	1,044,459	911	
Chlamydia trachomatis	DUW	Chlamydiota	1,042,519	894	
Chlamydophila abortus	S26-3	Chlamydiota	1,144,377	961	
Chlamydophila caviae	GPIC	Chlamydiota	1,173,390	998	
Chlamydophila felis	FeC56	Chlamydiota	1,166,239	1,005	
Chlamydophila pneumoniae	AR39	Chlamydiota	1,229,853	1,110	
Chlamydophila pneumoniae	CWL029	Chlamydiota	1,230,230	1,052	
Chlamydophila pneumoniae	J138	Chlamydiota	1,226,565	1,069	
Chlamydophila pneumoniae	TW183	Chlamydiota	1,225,935	1,113	ALTANA Pharma
Parachlamy diaspecies	UWE25	Chlamydiota	2,414,465	2,031	

== Chloroflexota ==
Species	Strain	Type	Base Pairs	Genes	Reference
Dehalococcoides mccartyi	195	Dehalococcoidetes	1,469,720	1,580	
Dehalococcoides mccartyi	CBDB1	Dehalococcoidetes	1,395,502	1,458	
Dehalococcoides mccartyi	DCMB5	Dehalococcoidetes	1,431,902	1,526	
Dehalococcoides mccartyi	BTF08	Dehalococcoidetes	1,452,335	1,580	

== Cyanobacteria ==
Species	Strain	Type	Base Pairs	Genes	Reference
Anabaena nostoc	PCC7120	Nostocales	6,413,771	5,368	
Anabaena variabilis	ATCC29413	Nostocales	6,365,727	5,039	DOE Joint Genome Institute
Cyanobacteria bacterium	YellowstoneA	Chroococcales	2,932,766	2,760	
Cyanobacteria bacterium	YellowstoneB	Chroococcales	3,046,682	2,862	
Gloeobacter violaceus	PCC7421	Gloeobacteria	4,659,019	4,430	
Prochlorococcus marinus	MED4	Prochlorales	1,657,990	1,716	
Prochlorococcus marinus	MIT9312	Prochlorales	1,709,204	1,809	Unpublished
Prochlorococcus marinus	MIT9313	Prochlorales	2,410,873	2,273	
Prochlorococcus marinus	NATL2A	Prochlorales	1,842,899	1,890	Unpublished
Prochlorococcus marinus	SS120	Prochlorales	1,751,080	1,882	
Synechococcus elongatus	PCC6301	Chroococcales	2,696,255	2,525	Unpublished
Synechococcus elongatus	PCC7942	Chroococcales	2,695,903	2,611	Unpublished
Synechococcus species	WH8102	Chroococcales	2,434,428	2,526	
Synechococcus species	CC9605	Chroococcales	2,510,659	2,638	Unpublished
Synechococcus species	CC9902	Chroococcales	2,234,828	2,304	Unpublished
Synechocystis species	PCC6803	Chroococcales	3,573,470	3,167	
Thermosynechococcus elongatus	bp1	Chroococcales	2,593,857	2,475	Unpublished

== Deferribacterota ==
Species	Strain	Type	Base Pairs	Genes	Reference
Geovibrio sp.		Deferribacterota	2,971,658	2,415	DOE Joint Genome Institute
Mucispirillum schaedleri	ASF457	Deferribacterota	2,319,180	2,144	Broad Institute
Denitrovibrio acetiphilus	DSM 12809	Deferribacterota	3,222,077	3,068	
Calditerrivibrio nitroreducens	DSM 19672	Deferribacterota	2,157,835	2,117	
Deferribacter desulfuricans	SSM1	Deferribacterota	2,234,389	2,184	
Flexistipes sinusarabici	DSM 4947	Deferribacterota	2,526,590	2,397	

== Deinococcota ==
Species	Strain	Type	Base Pairs	Genes	Reference	GenBank Identifier
Deinococcus deserti	VCD115	Deinococcales	2,819,842			Chromosome NC_012526 Plasmid 1 NC_012528; Plasmid 2 NC_012529; Plasmid 3 NC_012528
Deinococcus geothermalis	DSM 11300	Deinococcales	2,467,205	2,335	DOE Joint Genome Institute	Chromosome CP000359 Plasmid pDGEO01 CP000358; Plasmid pDGEO02 CP000856
Deinococcus gobiensis	I-0	Deinococcales	3,137,147			Chromosome CP002191 Plasmid P1 CP002192; Plasmid P2 CP002193; Plasmid P3 CP002194; Plasmid P4 CP002195; Plasmid P5 CP002196; Plasmid P6 CP002197
Deinococcus maricopensis	DSM 21211	Deinococcales	3,498,530		US DOE Joint Genome Institute	CP002454
Deinococcus proteolyticus	MRP	Deinococcales	2,147,060		US DOE Joint Genome Institute	Chromosome CP002536 Plasmid pDEIPR01 CP002537; Plasmid pDEIPR02 CP002538; Plasmid pDEIPR03 CP002539; Plasmid pDEIPR04 CP002540
Deinococcus radiodurans	R1	Deinococcales	Chromosome 1: 2,648,638 Chromosome 2: 412,348	Chromosome 1: 2,579 Chromosome 2: 357		Chromosome 1 NC_001263 Chromosome 2 NC_001264; Plasmid CP1 NC_000959; Plasmid MP1 NC_000958
Marinithermus hydrothermalis	DSM 14884	Thermales	2,269,167		DOE Joint Genome Institute	CP002630
Meiothermus ruber	DSM 1279	Thermales	3,097,457		DOE Joint Genome Institute	CP001743
Meiothermus silvanus	DSM 9946	Thermales	3,249,394			Chromosome CP002042 Plasmid pMESIL01 CP002043; Plasmid pMESIL02 CP002044
Oceanithermus profundus	DSM 14977	Thermales	2,303,940		DOE Joint Genome Institute	Chromosome CP002361 Plasmid pOCEPR01
Thermus scotoductus	SA-01	Thermales	2,346,803			Chromosome CP001962 Plasmid pTSC8 CP001963
Thermus species	CCB_US3_UF1	Thermales	2,243,772		Universiti Sains Malaysia	Chromosome CP003126 Plasmid pTCCB09 CP003127
Thermus thermophilus	HB27	Thermales	1,894,877	1,982		Chromosome AE017221 Plasmid pTT27 AE017222
Thermus thermophilus	HB8	Thermales	1,849,742	1,973	Nara Institute of Science and Technology	Chromosome NC_006461 Plasmid pTT27 NC_006462; Plasmid pTT8 NC_006463
Thermus thermophilus	JL-18	Thermales	1,902,595		DOE Joint Genome Institute	Chromosome CP003252 Plasmid pTTJL1801 CP003253; Plasmid pTTJL1802 CP003254
Thermus thermophilus	SG0.5JP17-16	Thermales	1,863,201		DOE Joint Genome Institute	Chromosome CP002777 Plasmid pTHTHE1601 CP002778
Truepera radiovictrix	DSM 17093	Deinococcales	3,260,398		DOE Joint Genome Institute	CP002049

== Fibrobacterota/Acidobacteriota group ==
Species	Strain	Type	Base Pairs	Genes	Reference
Acidobacteria bacterium	Ellin345	Acidobacteriota	5,650,368	4,777	Unpublished
Leifsonia xyli	CTCB07	Acidobacteriota	2,584,158	2,030	
Propionibacterium acnes	KPA171202	Acidobacteriota	2,560,265	2,297	
Rubrobacter xylanophilus	DSM9941	Acidobacteriota	3,225,748	3,140	DOE Joint Genome Institute
Tropheryma whippelii	TW08/27	Acidobacteriota	925,938	784	
Tropheryma whippelii	Twist	Acidobacteriota	927,303	808	

== Bacillota ==
Species	Strain	Type	Base Pairs	Genes	Reference
Bacillus anthracis	Ames	Bacilli	5,227,293	5,311	
Bacillus anthracis	Sterne	Bacilli	5,228,663	5,287	Unpublished
Bacillus cereus	ATCC10987	Bacilli	5,224,283	5,603	
Bacillus cereus	ATCC14579	Bacilli	5,411,809	5,234	
Bacillus cereus	ZK	Bacilli	5,300,915	5,134	Unpublished
Bacillus clausii	KSMK16	Bacilli	4,303,871	4,108	
Bacillus halodurans	C125	Bacilli	4,202,352	4,066	
Bacillus licheniformis	ATCC14580	Bacilli	4,222,334	4,152	
Bacillus licheniformis	Unspecified	Bacilli	4,222,645	4,196	
Bacillus licheniformis	DSM13	Bacilli	4,222,645	4,196	
Bacillus subtilis	168	Bacilli	4,214,630	4,106	
Bacillus thuringiensis	9727	Bacilli	5,237,682	5,117	
Carboxydothermus hydrogenoformans	Z2901	Clostridia	2,401,520	2,620	
Clostridium acetobutylicum	ATCC824	Clostridia	3,940,880	3,672	
Clostridioides difficile	QCD-32g58	Clostridia	3,840,681		Unpublished
Clostridium perfringens	13	Clostridia	3,031,430	2,660	
Clostridium tetani	E88	Clostridia	2,799,251	2,373	
Desulfitobacterium hafniense	Y51	Clostridia	5,727,534	5,060	
Enterococcus faecalis	V583	Bacilli	3,218,031	3,113	
Geobacillus kaustophilus	HTA426	Bacilli	3,544,776	3,498	
Lactobacillus acetotolerans	NCFM	Bacilli			
Lactobacillus acidophilus	NCFM	Bacilli	1,993,564	1,864	
Lactobacillus delbrueckii	bulgaricus	Bacilli	1,864,998	2,096	Unpublished
Lactobacillus johnsonii	NCC533	Bacilli	1,992,676	1,821	
Lactobacillus plantarum	WCFS1	Bacilli	3,308,274	3,051	
Lactobacillus sakei	23K	Bacilli	1,884,661	1,885	Unpublished
Lactobacillus sakei	sakei23K	Bacilli	1,884,661	1,885	Unpublished
Lactobacillus salivarius	UCC118	Bacilli	1,827,111	1,717	Unpublished
Lactococcus lactis	IL1403	Bacilli	2,365,589	2,266	
Listeria innocua	Clip11262	Bacilli	3,011,208	2,981	
Listeria monocytogenes	EGD	Bacilli	2,944,528	2,855	
Listeria monocytogenes	4b	Bacilli	2,905,187	2,821	
Moorella thermoacetica	ATCC39073	Clostridia	2,628,784	2,465	Unpublished
Oceanobacillus iheyensis	HTE831	Bacilli	3,630,528	3,496	
Staphylococcus aureus	COL	Bacilli	2,809,422	2,673	
Staphylococcus aureus	MRSA252	Bacilli	2,902,619	2,744	
Staphylococcus aureus	MSSA476	Bacilli	2,799,802	2,619	
Staphylococcus aureus	Mu50	Bacilli	2,878,529	2,699	
Staphylococcus aureus	MW2	Bacilli	2,820,462	2,632	
Staphylococcus aureus	N315	Bacilli	2,814,816	2,593	
Staphylococcus aureus	NCTC8325	Bacilli	2,821,361	2,892	Unpublished
Staphylococcus aureus	RF122	Bacilli	2,742,531	2,589	Unpublished
Staphylococcus aureus	USA300	Bacilli	2,872,769	2,560	
Staphylococcus epidermidis	ATCC12228	Bacilli	2,499,279	2,419	Unpublished
Staphylococcus epidermidis	RP62A	Bacilli	2,616,530	2,494	
Staphylococcus haemolyticus	JCSC1435	Bacilli	2,685,015	2,678	
Staphylococcus saprophyticus	saprophyticus	Bacilli	2,516,575	2,446	
Streptococcus agalactiae	A909	Bacilli	2,127,839	1,996	
Streptococcus agalactiae	NEM316	Bacilli	2,211,485	2,134	
Streptococcus agalactiae	2603 V/R	Bacilli	2,160,267	2,124	
Streptococcus mutans	UAB159	Bacilli	2,030,921	1,960	
Streptococcus pneumoniae	R6	Bacilli	2,038,615	2,043	
Streptococcus pneumoniae	TIGR4	Bacilli	2,160,842	2,125	
Streptococcus pyogenes	M5Manfredo	Bacilli	1,841,271		Unpublished
Streptococcus pyogenes	MGAS10270	Bacilli	1,928,252	1,987	
Streptococcus pyogenes	MGAS10394	Bacilli	1,899,877	1,886	
Streptococcus pyogenes	MGAS10750	Bacilli	1,937,111	1,979	
Streptococcus pyogenes	MGAS2096	Bacilli	1,860,355	1,898	
Streptococcus pyogenes	MGAS315	Bacilli	1,900,521	1,865	
Streptococcus pyogenes	MGAS5005	Bacilli	1,838,554	1,865	
Streptococcus pyogenes	MGAS6180	Bacilli	1,897,573	1,894	
Streptococcus pyogenes	MGAS8232	Bacilli	1,895,017	1,845	
Streptococcus pyogenes	MGAS9429	Bacilli	1,836,467	1,877	
Streptococcus pyogenes	SF370	Bacilli	1,852,441	1,696	
Streptococcus pyogenes	SSI1	Bacilli	1,894,275	1,861	
Streptococcus thermophilus	CNRZ1066	Bacilli	1,796,226	1,915	
Streptococcus thermophilus	LMG18311	Bacilli	1,796,846	1,889	
Thermoanaerobacter tengcongensis	MB4T	Clostridia	2,689,445	2,588	Unpublished

== Fusobacteriota ==
Species	Strain	Type	Base Pairs	Genes	Reference	GenBank Identifier
Fusobacterium nucleatum	ATCC25586	Fusobacteria	2,174,500	2,067		
Fusobacterium sp.	11_3_2	Fusobacteria			Unpublished	ACUO00000000
Fusobacterium sp.	21_1A	Fusobacteria			Unpublished	ADEE00000000

== Planctomycetota ==
Species	Strain	Type	Base Pairs	Genes	Reference
Rhodopirellula baltica	strain1	Planctomycetes Planctomycetacia	7,145,576	7,325	Unpublished

== Pseudomonadota ==
=== Alphaproteobacteria ===
Species	Strain	Type	Base Pairs	Genes	Reference
Agrobacterium tumefaciens	C58	Alphaproteobacteria	2,841,581	2,722	
Anaplasma marginale	StMaries	Alphaproteobacteria	1,197,687	949	
Anaplasma phagocytophilum	HZ	Alphaproteobacteria	1,471,282	1,264	
Bartonella henselae	Houston-1	Alphaproteobacteria	1,931,047	1,612	
Bartonella quintana	Toulouse	Alphaproteobacteria	1,581,384	1,308	
Bradyrhizobium japonicum	USDA110	Alphaproteobacteria	9,105,828	8,317	
Brucella abortus	2308 (chromosome I)	Alphaproteobacteria	1,156,948	1,164	
	2308 (chromosome II)	Alphaproteobacteria	2,121,359	2,186	
Brucella abortus	9-941 (chromosome I)	Alphaproteobacteria	2,124,241	2,030	
	9-941 (chromosome II)	Alphaproteobacteria	1,162,204	1,055	
Brucella melitensis	16M (chromosome I)	Alphaproteobacteria	2,117,144	2,059	
	16M (chromosome II)	Alphaproteobacteria	1,177,787	1,139	
Brucella suis	1330 (chromosome I)	Alphaproteobacteria	2,107,794	2,123	
	1330 (chromosome II)	Alphaproteobacteria	1,207,381	1,150	
Caulobacter crescentus	CB15	Alphaproteobacteria	4,016,947	3,737	
Ehrlichia canis	Jake	Alphaproteobacteria	1,315,030	925	Unpublished
Ehrlichia chaffeensis	Arkansas	Alphaproteobacteria	1,176,248	1,105	
Ehrlichia ruminantium	Gardel	Alphaproteobacteria	1,499,920	950	Unpublished
Ehrlichia ruminantium	Welgevonden	Alphaproteobacteria	1,512,977	958	Unpublished
Unspecified	Unspecified	Alphaproteobacteria	1,516,355	920	
Erythrobacter litoralis	HTCC2594	Alphaproteobacteria	3,052,398	3,011	Unpublished
Gluconobacter oxydans	621H	Alphaproteobacteria	2,702,173	2,432	
Jannaschia species	CCS1	Alphaproteobacteria	4,317,977	4,212	Unpublished
Magnetospirillum magneticum	AMB1	Alphaproteobacteria	4,967,148	4,559	
Mesorhizobium loti	MAFF303099	Alphaproteobacteria	7,036,071	6,752	
Neorickettsia sennetsu	Miyayama	Alphaproteobacteria	859,006	932	
Nitrobacter hamburgensis	X14	Alphaproteobacteria	4,406,967	3,804	Unpublished
Nitrobacter winogradskyi	Nb255	Alphaproteobacteria	3,402,093	3,122	Unpublished
Novosphingobium aromaticivorans	DSM12444	Alphaproteobacteria	3,561,584	3,324	Unpublished
Pelagibacter ubique	HTCC1062	Alphaproteobacteria	1,308,759	1,354	
Rhizobium etli	CFN42	Alphaproteobacteria	4,381,608	4,067	
Rhizobium leguminosarum	viciae3841	Alphaproteobacteria	7,751,309	4,746	Unpublished
Rhodobacter sphaeroides	2.4.1	Alphaproteobacteria	3,188,609	3,022	Unpublished
Unspecified	Unspecified	Alphaproteobacteria	943,016	835	Unpublished
Rhodopseudomonas palustris	BisB18	Alphaproteobacteria	5,513,844	4,886	Unpublished
Rhodopseudomonas palustris	BisB5	Alphaproteobacteria	4,892,717	4,397	Unpublished
Rhodopseudomonas palustris	CGA009	Alphaproteobacteria	5,459,213	4,833	
Rhodopseudomonas palustris	HaA2	Alphaproteobacteria	5,331,656	4,683	Unpublished
Rhodospirillum rubrum	ATCC11170	Alphaproteobacteria	4,352,825	3,791	Unpublished
Rickettsia bellii	RML369-C	Alphaproteobacteria	1,522,076	1,429	Unpublished
Rickettsia conorii	Malish7	Alphaproteobacteria	1,268,755	1,374	
Rickettsia felis	URRWXCal2	Alphaproteobacteria	1,485,148	1,400	
Rickettsia prowazekii	Madrid-E	Alphaproteobacteria	1,111,523	834	
Rickettsia typhi	Wilmington	Alphaproteobacteria	1,111,496	838	
Silicibacter pomeroyi	DSS3	Alphaproteobacteria	4,109,442	3,810	
Silicibacter species	TM1040	Alphaproteobacteria	3,200,938	3,030	Unpublished
Sinorhizobium medicae	WSM419	Alphaproteobacteria	3,781,904	3,635	
Sinorhizobium meliloti	Rm1021	Alphaproteobacteria	3,654,135	3,341	
Sphingopyxis alaskensis	RB2256	Alphaproteobacteria	3,345,170	3,165	Unpublished
Wolbachia endosymbiont	TRS	Alphaproteobacteria	1,080,084	805	
Wolbachia pipientis	wMel	Alphaproteobacteria	1,267,782	1,195	
Zymomonas mobilis	ZM4	Alphaproteobacteria	2,056,416	1,998	

=== Betaproteobacteria ===
Species	Strain	Type	Base Pairs	Genes	Reference
Azoarcus sp.	EbN1	Betaproteobacteria	4,296,230	4,128	2002
Bordetella bronchiseptica	RB50	Betaproteobacteria	5,339,179	5,006	Unpublished
Bordetella parapertussis	12822	Betaproteobacteria	4,773,551	4,402	Unpublished
Bordetella pertussis	TohamaI	Betaproteobacteria	4,086,189	3,806	Unpublished
Burkholderia cenocepacia	AU1054	Betaproteobacteria	3,294,563	2,965	Unpublished
Unspecified	Unspecified	Betaproteobacteria	2,788,459	2,472	Unpublished
Unspecified	Unspecified	Betaproteobacteria	1,196,094	1,040	Unpublished
Burkholderia mallei	ATCC23344	Betaproteobacteria	3,510,148	2,996	Unpublished
Unspecified	Unspecified	Betaproteobacteria	2,325,379	2,029	2004
Burkholderia pseudomallei	1710b	Betaproteobacteria	4,126,292	3,736	Unpublished
Unspecified	Unspecified	Betaproteobacteria	3,181,762	2,611	Unpublished
Burkholderia pseudomallei	K96243	Betaproteobacteria	4,074,542 (chromosome I); 3,173,005 (chromosome II)	3,460 (chromosome I); 2,395 (chromosome II)	2004
Burkholderia species	383	Betaproteobacteria	3,694,126	3,334	Unpublished
Unspecified	Unspecified	Betaproteobacteria	3,587,082	3,174	Unpublished
Unspecified	Unspecified	Betaproteobacteria	1,395,069	1,209	Unpublished
Burkholderia thailandensis	E264	Betaproteobacteria	3,809,201	3,276	2005
Unspecified	Unspecified	Betaproteobacteria	2,914,771	2,358	2005
Burkholderia xenovorans	LB400	Betaproteobacteria	4,895,836	4,430	Unpublished
Unspecified	Unspecified	Betaproteobacteria	3,363,523	2,960	Unpublished
Unspecified	Unspecified	Betaproteobacteria	1,471,779	1,312	Unpublished
Chromobacterium violaceum	ATCC12472	Betaproteobacteria	4,751,080	4,407	2003
Dechloromonas aromatica	RCB	Betaproteobacteria	4,501,104	4,171	Unpublished
Methylobacillus flagellatus	KT	Betaproteobacteria	2,971,517	2,753	Unpublished
Neisseria gonorrhoeae	FA1090	Betaproteobacteria	2,153,922	2,002	Unpublished
Neisseria meningitidis	serogroup A strain Z2491	Betaproteobacteria	2,184,406	2,121	2000
Neisseria meningitidis	serogroup B strain MC58	Betaproteobacteria	2,272,360	2,063	2000
Nitrosomonas europaea	Schmidt	Betaproteobacteria	2,812,094	2,574	2003
Nitrosospira multiformis	ATCC25196	Betaproteobacteria	3,184,243	2,757	Unpublished
Polaromonas species	JS666	Betaproteobacteria	5,200,264	4,817	Unpublished
Ralstonia eutropha	JMP134	Betaproteobacteria	3,806,533	3,439	Unpublished
Unspecified	Unspecified	Betaproteobacteria	2,726,152	2,407	Unpublished
Ralstonia metallidurans	CH34	Betaproteobacteria	3,928,089	3,601	Unpublished
Unspecified	Unspecified	Betaproteobacteria	2,580,084	2,313	Unpublished
Ralstonia solanacearum	GMI1000	Betaproteobacteria	3,716,413	3,441	2002
Unspecified	Unspecified	Betaproteobacteria	2,094,509	1,679	
Rhodoferax ferrireducens	DSM15236	Betaproteobacteria	4,712,337	4,170	Unpublished
Thiobacillus denitrificans	ATCC25259	Betaproteobacteria	2,909,809	2,827	Unpublished

=== Gammaproteobacteria ===
Species	Strain	Type	Base Pairs	Genes	Reference
Acinetobacter sp.	ADP1	Gammaproteobacteria	3,598,621	3,325	2004
Baumannia cicadellinicola	Hc	Gammaproteobacteria	686,194	595	Unpublished
Blochmannia floridanus	Strain	Gammaproteobacteria	705,557	589	2003
Blochmannia pennsylvanicus	bpEN	Gammaproteobacteria	791,654	610	2005
Buchnera aphidicola	APS	Gammaproteobacteria	640,681	564	2000
Buchnera aphidicola	B	Gammaproteobacteria	615,980	504	2003
Buchnera aphidicola	Sg	Gammaproteobacteria	641,454	545	2002
Carsonella ruddii	PV	Gammaproteobacteria	159,662	182	2006
Chromohalobacter salexigens	DSM3043	Gammaproteobacteria	3,696,649	3,298	Unpublished
Colwellia psychrerythraea	34H	Gammaproteobacteria	5,373,180	4,910	Unpublished
Coxiella burnetii	RSA493	Gammaproteobacteria	1,995,281	2,016	2003
Erwinia carotovora	SCRI1043	Gammaproteobacteria	5,064,019	4,492	Unpublished
Escherichia coli	536	Gammaproteobacteria	4,938,920	4,685	Unpublished
Escherichia coli	CFT073	Gammaproteobacteria	5,231,428	5,379	2002
Escherichia coli	K-12	Gammaproteobacteria	4,639,675 (4,646,332)	4,331 (4,337)	1997, 2005
Escherichia coli	O157:H7	Gammaproteobacteria	5,528,445 (5,498,450)	5,349 (5,361)	2001, 1999
Escherichia coli	UTI89	Gammaproteobacteria	5,065,741	5,066	Unpublished
Francisella tularensis	LVS	Gammaproteobacteria	1,895,994	1,967	Unpublished
Francisella tularensis	SCHUS4	Gammaproteobacteria	1,892,819	1,804	2005
Haemophilus ducreyi	3500HP	Gammaproteobacteria	1,698,955	1,717	Unpublished
Haemophilus influenzae	86-028NP	Gammaproteobacteria	1,913,428	1,792	2005
Haemophilus influenzae	Rd	Gammaproteobacteria	1,830,138	1,709	1995
Hahella chejuensis	KCTC2396	Gammaproteobacteria	7,215,267	6,782	2005
Idiomarina loihiensis	L2TR	Gammaproteobacteria	2,839,318	2,628	2004
Legionella pneumophila	Lens	Gammaproteobacteria	3,345,687	2,947	2004
Legionella pneumophila	Paris	Gammaproteobacteria	3,503,610	3,082	2004
Legionella pneumophila	Philadelphia1	Gammaproteobacteria	3,397,754	2,942	Unpublished
Mannheimia succiniciproducens	MBEL55E	Gammaproteobacteria	2,314,078	2,384	Unpublished
Methylococcus capsulatus	Bath	Gammaproteobacteria	3,304,561	2,960	2004
Nitrosococcus oceani	ATCC19707	Gammaproteobacteria	3,481,691	2,976	Unpublished
Pasteurella multocida	Pm70	Gammaproteobacteria	2,257,487	2,014	2001
Photobacterium profundum	SS9	Gammaproteobacteria	4,085,304	3,416	Unpublished
Unspecified	Unspecified	Gammaproteobacteria	2,237,943	1,997	Unpublished
Photorhabdus luminescens	laumondiiTTO1	Gammaproteobacteria	5,688,987	4,905	Unpublished
Pseudoalteromonas haloplanktis	TAC125	Gammaproteobacteria	3,214,944	2,941	2005
Unspecified	Unspecified	Gammaproteobacteria	635,328	546	
Pseudomonas aeruginosa	VRFPA04	Gammaproteobacteria	6,818,030	5,939	2016
Pseudomonas entomophila	L48	Gammaproteobacteria	5,888,780	5,168	Unpublished
Pseudomonas fluorescens	Pf-5	Gammaproteobacteria	7,074,893	6,137	2005
Pseudomonas fluorescens	PfO-1	Gammaproteobacteria	6,438,405	5,736	Unpublished
Pseudomonas putida	KT2440	Gammaproteobacteria	6,181,863	5,350	2002
Pseudomonas syringae	B728a	Gammaproteobacteria	6,093,698	5,136	2005
Pseudomonas syringae	DC3000	Gammaproteobacteria	6,397,126	5,470	2003
Pseudomonas syringae	phaseolicola1448A	Gammaproteobacteria	5,928,787	4,983	Unpublished
Psychrobacter arcticum	273-4	Gammaproteobacteria	2,650,701	2,147	Unpublished
Psychrobacter cryohalolentis	K5	Gammaproteobacteria	~3.1Mb	2,575	
Unspecified	Unspecified	Gammaproteobacteria	3,059,876	2,467	Unpublished
Saccharophagus degradans	Feb-40	Gammaproteobacteria	5,057,531	4,008	Unpublished
Salmonella enterica	ATCC9150	Gammaproteobacteria	4,585,229	4,093	2004
Salmonella enterica	SCB67	Gammaproteobacteria	4,755,700	4,445	2005
Salmonella enterica	Ty2	Gammaproteobacteria	4,791,961	4,323	2003
Salmonella enterica	typhiCT18	Gammaproteobacteria	4,809,037	4,600	2001
Salmonella typhimurium	LT2	Gammaproteobacteria	4,857,432	4,452	2001
Shewanella denitrificans	OS217	Gammaproteobacteria	4,545,906	3,754	Unpublished
Shewanella oneidensis	MR1	Gammaproteobacteria	4,969,803	4,630	2002
Shigella boydii	Sb227	Gammaproteobacteria	4,519,823	4,142	2005
Shigella dysenteriae	Sd197	Gammaproteobacteria	4,369,232	4,277	2005
Shigella flexneri	2457T	Gammaproteobacteria	4,599,354	4,073	2003
Shigella flexneri	2a301	Gammaproteobacteria	4,607,203	4,436	2002
Shigella sonnei	Ss046	Gammaproteobacteria	4,825,265	4,224	2005
Sodalis glossinidius	morsitans	Gammaproteobacteria	4,171,146	2,432	2006
Thiomicrospira crunogena	XCL2	Gammaproteobacteria	2,427,734	2,192	Unpublished
Vibrio cholerae	N16961	Gammaproteobacteria	2,961,149 (chromosome I); 1,072,315 (chromosome II)	2,736 (chromosome I); 1,092 (chromosome II)	2000
Vibrio fischeri	ES114	Gammaproteobacteria	2,906,179 (chromosome I); 1,332,022 (chromosome II)	2,575 (chromosome I); 1,172 (chromosome II)	2005
Vibrio parahaemolyticus	RIMD2210633	Gammaproteobacteria	3,288,558 (chromosome I); 1,877,212 (chromosome II)	3,080 (chromosome I); 1,752 (chromosome II)	2000
Vibrio vulnificus	CMCP6	Gammaproteobacteria	3,281,944 (chromosome I); 1,844,853 (chromosome II)	2,973 (chromosome I); 1,565 (chromosome II)	2003
Vibrio vulnificus	YJ016	Gammaproteobacteria	3,354,505 (chromosome I); 1,857,073 (chromosome II)	3,262 (chromosome I); 1,697 (chromosome II)	2003
Wigglesworthia glossinidia	Strain	Gammaproteobacteria	697,724	611	2002
Xanthomonas axonopodis	citri306	Gammaproteobacteria	5,175,554	4,312	2002
Xanthomonas campestris	8004	Gammaproteobacteria	5,148,708	4,273	2005
Xanthomonas campestris	8510	Gammaproteobacteria	5,178,466	4,487	2005
Xanthomonas campestris	ATCC33913	Gammaproteobacteria	5,076,188	4,181	2002
Xanthomonas oryzae	KACC10331	Gammaproteobacteria	4,941,439	4,637	2005
Xanthomonas oryzae	MAFF311018	Gammaproteobacteria	4,940,217	4,372	Unpublished
Xylella fastidiosa	9a5c	Gammaproteobacteria	2,679,306	2,766	2000
Xylella fastidiosa	Temecula1	Gammaproteobacteria	2,519,802	2,034	2003
Yersinia pestis	Antiqua	Gammaproteobacteria	4,702,289	4,167	2006
Yersinia pestis	CO-92BiovarOrientalis	Gammaproteobacteria	4,653,728	4,008	2001
Yersinia pestis	KIM	Gammaproteobacteria	4,600,755	4,090	2002
Yersinia pestis	Mediaevalis	Gammaproteobacteria	4,595,065	3,895	2004
Yersinia pseudotuberculosis	IP32953	Gammaproteobacteria	4,744,671	3,974	2004

== Myxococcota–Campylobacterota ==
Species	Strain	Type	Base Pairs	Genes	Reference
Anaeromyxobacter dehalogenans	2CP-C	delta-epsilon	5,013,479	4,346	Unpublished
Bdellovibrio bacteriovorus	HD100	delta-epsilon	3,782,950	3,583	2004
Campylobacter jejuni	NCTC11168	delta-epsilon	1,641,481	1,643	2000
Campylobacter jejuni	RM1221	delta-epsilon	1,777,831	1,838	2005
Desulfotalea psychrophila	LSv54	delta-epsilon	3,523,383	3,118	Unpublished
Desulfovibrio desulfuricans	G20	delta-epsilon	3,730,232	3,775	Unpublished
Desulfovibrio vulgaris	Hildenborough	delta-epsilon	3,570,858	3,379	2004
Geobacter metallireducens	GS15	delta-epsilon	3,997,420	3,519	Unpublished
Geobacter sulfurreducens	PCA	delta-epsilon	3,814,139	3,447	2003
Helicobacter hepaticus	ATCC51449	delta-epsilon	1,799,146	1,875	2003
Helicobacter pylori	26695	delta-epsilon	1,667,867	1,566	1997
Helicobacter pylori	HPAG1	delta-epsilon	1,596,366	1,536	Unpublished
Helicobacter pylori	J99	delta-epsilon	1,643,831	1,491	1999
Lawsonia intracellularis	PHEMN1-00	delta-epsilon	1,719,014	1,344	Unpublished
Lawsonia intracellularis	PHE/MN1-00	delta-epsilon	1,457,619 (chromosome); 27,048 (plasmid A); 39,794 (plasmid B); 194,553 (plasmid C)	1,187; 29 (plasmid A); 24 (plasmid B); 104 (plasmid C)	2013
Myxococcus xanthus	DK1622	delta-epsilon	9,139,763	7,331	Unpublished
Pelobacter carbinolicus	DSM2380	delta-epsilon	3,665,893	3,119	Unpublished
Sorangium cellulosum	So ce56	delta-epsilon	13,033,779	9,367	2007
Sulfurimonas denitrificans	DSM1251	delta-epsilon	2,201,561	2,104	2007
Syntrophus aciditrophicus	SB	delta-epsilon	3,179,300	3,168	Unpublished
Thiomicrospira denitrificans	ATCC33889	delta-epsilon	2,201,561	2,097	Unpublished
Wolinella succino	DSMZ1740	delta-epsilon	2,110,355	2,044	2003

== Spirochaetota ==
Species	Strain	Type	Base Pairs	Genes	Reference
Borrelia burgdorferi	B31	Spirochaetota	910,724	850	
Borrelia garinii	PBi	Spirochaetota	904,246	832	
Leptospira interrogans	56601	Spirochaetota	4,332,241	4,358	
Unspecified	Unspecified	Spirochaetota	358,943	367	
Leptospira interrogans	FiocruzL1130	Spirochaetota	4,277,185	3,394	
Unspecified	Unspecified	Spirochaetota	350,181	264	
Treponema denticola	ATCC35405	Spirochaetota	2,843,201	2,767	
Treponema pallidum	Nichols	Spirochaetota	1,138,011	1,031	

== Synergistota ==
Species	Strain	Type	Base Pairs	Genes	Reference	GenBank Identifier
Thermovirga lienii	Cas60314, DSM 17291	Synergistia	1,967,774		DOE Joint Genome Institute	CP003096

== Mycoplasmatota ==
Species	Strain	Type	Base Pairs	Genes	Reference	GenBank Identifier
Mesoplasma florum	L1	Mollicutes	793,224	683	Unpublished	
Mycoplasma anatis	1340, ATCC 25524	Mollicutes				AFVJ00000000
Mycoplasma capricolum	ATCC273	Mollicutes	1,010,023	812	Unpublished	
Mycoplasma gallisepticum	R	Mollicutes	996,422	726		
Mycoplasma genitalium	G37	Mollicutes	580,076	476		
Mycoplasma haemocanis	Illinois	Mollicutes	919,992		Unpublished	CP003199
Mycoplasma hyopneumoniae	232	Mollicutes	892,758	691		
Mycoplasma hyopneumoniae	7448	Mollicutes	920,079	663		
Mycoplasma hyopneumoniae	J	Mollicutes	897,405	665		
Mycoplasma hyorhinis	GDL-1	Mollicutes	837,480		Unpublished	CP003231
Mycoplasma leachii	99/014/6	Mollicutes	1,017,232		Unpublished	FR668087
Mycoplasma mobile	163K	Mollicutes	777,079	635		
Mycoplasma mycoides	SC	Mollicutes	1,211,703	1,016		
Mycoplasma penetrans	HF2	Mollicutes	1,358,633	1,037		
Mycoplasma pneumoniae	M129	Mollicutes	816,394	688		
Mycoplasma pulmonis	UAB	Mollicutes	963,879	782		
Mycoplasma synoviae	53	Mollicutes	799,476	672		
Phytoplas maasteris	AYWB	Mollicutes	706,569	671	Unpublished	
Phytoplas maasteris	OY	Mollicutes	860,631	754		
Ureaplasma urealyticum	serovar3	Mollicutes	751,719	611		

== Thermodesulfobacteriota ==
Species	Strain	Type	Base Pairs	Genes	Reference
Thermodesulfatator indicus	CIR29812(T)	Thermodesulfobacteriota	2,322,224	2,291	2012
Thermodesulfobacterium geofontis	OPF15(T)	Thermodesulfobacteriota	1,634,377	1,635	2013

== Thermotogota ==
Species	Strain	Type	Base Pairs	Genes	Reference
Fervidobacterium nodosum	Rt17-B1	Thermotogota	1,950,000	1,750	2009
Kosmotoga olearia	TBF 19.5.1	Thermotogota	2,302,126	2,118	2011
Mesotoga prima	MesG1.Ag.4.2	Thermotogota	2,974,229 chromosome 1,724 plasmid	2,736	2012
Thermosipho africanus	TCF52B	Thermotogota	2,016,657	2,000	2009
Thermosipho melanesiensis	BI429	Thermotogota	1,920,000	1,879	2009
Thermotoga lettingae	TMO	Thermotogota	2,140,000	2,040	2009
Thermotoga maritima	MSB8	Thermotogota	1,860,725	1,846	1999, 2013
Thermotoga petrophila	RKU-1	Thermotogota	1,820,000	1,785	2009

== See also ==
- Genome project
- Human microbiome project
- List of sequenced archaeal genomes
- List of sequenced eukaryotic genomes
- List of sequenced mitochondrial genomes
- List of sequenced plastomes
- List of sequenced animal genomes
- List of sequenced animal mitochondrial genomes
- List of sequenced fungi genomes
- List of sequenced fungi mitochondrial genomes
- List of sequenced plant genomes
- List of sequenced plant mitochondrial genomes
- List of sequenced protist genomes
