= Deferribacter autotrophicus =

Scientific classification
- Domain: Bacteria
- Kingdom: Pseudomonadati
- Phylum: Deferribacterota
- Class: Deferribacteres
- Order: Deferribacterales
- Family: Deferribacteraceae
- Genus: Deferribacter
- Species: D. autotrophicus

Binomial name
- Deferribacter autotrophicus Slobodkina et al. 2009

Type strain
- DSM 21529; VKPM B-10097

Species of bacterium

Deferribacter autotrophicus is the most recently discovered species in the Deferribacter genus, isolated from a deep sea hydrothermal field. This motile, thermophilic, anaerobic organism stands out for its unique metabolic versatility, particularly its autotrophic capabilities which had not been previously observed in its genus.

== Discovery ==
Deferribacter autotrophicus was discovered in a sample from the Ashadze field, the deepest known ocean hydrothermal field, collected in March 2007 and was later isolated by G. B. Slobodkina and colleagues (2009). The sample was collected aboard the Serpentine cruise, and then stored at 4 °C in sterile boxes of seawater from the site. Later, 10% of the sample was inoculated into an anaerobic, sterile, liquid medium with lactate and crystalline Fe(III) oxide as metabolites. Dilutions were performed to obtain a pure culture of the bacteria. Direct colony plate counts were used to measure bacterial growth. Colonies appeared 7–10 days after incubation at 50 °C. Under the microscope, the cells were classified as single, paired or short-chained rods, with a single flagellum. After staining, it was determined that the strain was Gram-negative. More tests were run to determine optimal growth conditions and metabolic products.

== Etymology ==
The genus name Deferribacter comes from the Latin prefix de-, meaning "from", the noun ferrum, meaning iron, and the Greek noun bacter, meaning rod, which is interpreted to mean "iron-reducing rod". The genus was given its name with the discovery of Deferribacter thermophilus, the type species of the genus, in 1997 by Greene and colleagues, as the newly discovered species was phylogenetically and phenotypically distinct from previously described genera.

The species epithet autotrophicus comes from the Greek prefix autos-, meaning "self", and the Greek word trophikos, referring to feeding or nourishment, which is interpreted to mean "self-nourishment". This refers to autotrophic metabolism in which an organism can fix inorganic carbon sources, such as carbon dioxide, to make organic carbon molecules. Of the recognized species in the genus, Deferribacter autotrophicus is a chemolithoautotroph and is the only species in its genus capable of autotrophic metabolism.

== Taxonomy/phylogeny ==
=== Taxonomic classification ===
The Deferribacter genus is in the Deferribacterota phylum, formerly known as Deferribacteres. This phylum represents a collection of Gram-negative, rod-shaped, thermophilic, and hyperthermophilic bacteria. There is only one class within this phylum, Deferribacteres, which is funneled into a single order—Deferribacterales. This order comprises several families, to which Deferribacter belongs to the Deferribacteraceae family.

=== Species diversity ===
The Deferribacter genus comprises four species: D. thermophilus, D. desulfuricans, D. abyssi, and the most recently described D. autotrophicus. Following 16S rRNA gene sequencing of the type strain (=DSM 21529=VKPM B-10097), analysis revealed similarity to other species in the Deferribacter genus ranged from 94.3 to 95.5%, to which D. autotrophicus is most closely related to D. abyssi.

=== Genomic insights ===
Full genome analysis of Deferribacter autotrophicus suggests that the evolution of the species was significantly driven by lateral gene transfer. This is supported by its relative genome size of 2.54 Mb with a 32.62% GC content. This is about 300 Mbp bigger than the chromosome of D. desulfuricans, the only other species in the genus to have a full genome analysis. Additionally, D. autotrophicus also has remarkably similar metabolic pathways to those found in other species rather than being unique to the Deferribacter genus. For instance, D. autotrophicus is one of few species identified that is capable of undergoing the tricarboxylic acid (TCA) cycle in the reductive direction, which has not been observed in other members of the Deferribacter genus, but was observed in Geovibrio thiophilus, another species in the Deferribacterota phylum. The citrate synthase enzyme associated with carbon dioxide fixation in the reductive TCA cycle performed by D. autotrophicus is notably similar to the citrate synthase enzyme found in Geovibrio thiophilus with a 77% shared amino acid sequence identity. Likewise, the carbon monoxide hydrogenase enzyme in D. autotrophicus, which aids in carbon monoxide fixation, shares 74% amino acid identity with the corresponding enzyme found in Geobacter sulfurreducens.

== Physiology ==
Deferribacter autotrophicus, like other members of the Deferribacter genus, is a non-sporulating, rod-shaped bacterium exhibiting motility through a single polar flagellum. Cells are typically 0.5 and 0.6 μm in width and 3.0 to 3.5 μm in length.

=== Ecology ===
Deferribacter autotrophicus was discovered in the depths of the world's oceans, particularly in the Ashadze hydrothermal field, at a depth of 4100 meters. This bacterium demonstrates the ability to adapt to diverse environmental conditions. D. autotrophicus thrives across a wide temperature span of 25-75 °C, growing optimally at 60 °C. Additionally, it demonstrates resilience to varying pH levels, thriving within a pH range of 5.0 to 7.5, with peak growth occurring at a pH of 6.5. Moreover, D. autotrophicus shows versatility in salinity tolerance, capable of growth in 1.0-6.0%(w/v) NaCl concentrations, with optimal growth observed at 2.5% (w/v).

=== Metabolism ===
The diverse metabolism of Deferribacter autotrophicus is one of its defining characteristics with its ability to anaerobically oxidize both organic and inorganic compounds paired with the reduction of Fe(III), nitrate, Mn(IV), and elemental sulfur. Per its name, D. autotrophicus utilizes compounds like molecular hydrogen as an electron donor for ferric iron reduction and relies on inorganic carbon sources like carbon dioxide for autotrophic growth. This unique metabolic profile sets it apart from other species within its genus. Compared to other species in the Deferribacter genus, D. autotrophicus has the widest range of potential electron acceptors. Unlike D. thermophilus, D. autotrophicus demonstrates sulfur reduction capability. It also differs from its closest relative, D. abyssi, by its ability to reduce Mn(IV), and from D. desulfuricans, which can reduce sulfur but lacks the capacity to utilize Fe(III) or Mn(IV) as electron acceptors.

Further, D. autotrophicus is unique from other members of the genus due to its capability to utilize maltose as an electron donor to completely reduce nitrate to ammonium, bypassing the intermediate production of nitrite. Moreover, the genome contains genes for carbon-monoxide dehydrogenase enzymes, enabling anaerobic oxidation of carbon monoxide in the presence of nitrate. Specifically, it utilizes nitrate as an electron acceptor, yielding ammonium without needing other organic compounds. While carbon monoxide metabolism has been demonstrated in other species, D. autotrophicus is the only recognized member of the Deferribacterota phylum that exhibits such activity.

Genome sequencing revealed other possible metabolic pathways. One such pathway is the TCA Cycle in which the bacterium oxidizes organic acids, including acetate and pyruvate, as energy and carbon sources. Under chemolithoautotrophic conditions, D. autotrophicus is proposed to engage in the reductive TCA cycle, facilitating the synthesis of cellular materials from carbon dioxide and water. With this mode of metabolism, D. autotrophicus is capable of producing carbon compounds for cell material from carbon dioxide and water. Other metabolism mechanisms include the non-oxidative Pentose Phosphate pathway, in which pentose sugars are produced from glucose for nucleotide synthesis, and the Embden-Meyerhof-Parnas pathway, which breaks down glucose for energy production. These diverse metabolic mechanisms showcase the adaptability and resourcefulness of D. autotrophicus in utilizing various carbon sources and pathways to sustain its biological functions.

== Genomics ==
A complete genome analysis was performed on the collected strain SL50^{T} of D. autotrophicus, which was 2.54 Mb with a GC content of 32.6%. One-third of the genes were involved in regulating transcription and signal transduction, which allows the bacterium to adapt to changing environmental conditions, considering its extreme habitat in deep-sea hydrothermal vents. Furthermore, 19% of horizontally transferred genes were predicted to contribute to motility and synthesis of the cell membrane, which also contributes to its flexibility in harsh environments. Protein composition of D. autotrophicus is most similar overall to D. desulfuricans. Other related species sharing a common ancestor are Deltaproteobacteria, Firmicutes, and Aquificae with 54.7%, 48.6%, and 62.3% shared identity, respectively.

== Significance ==
Deferribacter autotrophicus is the first deep-sea bacterium to demonstrate chemolithoautotrophic growth and metabolism. The microorganisms within the Deferribacter genus are iron-reducing and hyperthermophilic, carrying out necessary processes, like metal cycling, even in extreme conditions. D. autotrophicus, in particular, can metabolize a wide range of inorganic materials and thus contribute to recycling materials in extremophilic conditions to contribute to ecological resilience.

In research, D. autotrophicus is valuable in its fixation of inorganic carbon and demonstrates the reductive TCA cycle, in which carbon dioxide and water are used to make carbon compounds. More than simply demonstrating how the process is completed, D. autotrophicus can also help study what allows an organism to undergo the process. For example, Deferribacter desulfuricans contains all of the genes associated with the TCA cycle with a 98% similar protein identity to the genes in D. autotrophicus that allow it to undergo the process. Still, D. desulfuricans is incapable of growing autotrophically.

Further, the reduction of Fe(III) in D. autotrophicus in the presence of both organic compounds and molecular hydrogen has been demonstrated yet the exact mechanism is unresolved. Unlike commonly known ferric iron reducers, such as Shewanella oneidensis and Geobacter sulfurreducens, homologs of some of the key genes involved in iron-reduction are not found in D. autotrophicus. D. autotrophicus is the only species in the Deferribacterota phylum with a sequenced genome that is capable of Fe(III) reduction. While D. desulfuricans shares some gene clusters homologous to those in D. autotrophicus that are essential for iron reduction, its inability to perform iron reduction for other reasons hinders its utility in elucidating conclusive mechanisms of iron reduction in the phylum. Studying the full genome of D. autotrophicus alongside those of other iron-reducers in the genus, such as D. thermophilus and D. abyssi, could fill this gap in knowledge.
