= Thermus igniterrae =

Scientific classification
- Domain: Bacteria
- Kingdom: Thermotogati
- Phylum: Deinococcota
- Class: Deinococci
- Order: Thermales
- Family: Thermaceae
- Genus: Thermus
- Species: T. igniterrae

Binomial name
- Thermus igniterrae Chung, Rainey, Valente, Nobre, & da Costa, 2000

Species of bacterium

Thermus igniterrae is a bacterium belonging to the Deinococcota phylum, known to be present in hazardous conditions. This species was identified in Iceland, together with Thermus antranikianii.
