= Thermus antranikianii =

Scientific classification
- Domain: Bacteria
- Kingdom: Thermotogati
- Phylum: Deinococcota
- Class: Deinococci
- Order: Thermales
- Family: Thermaceae
- Genus: Thermus
- Species: T. antranikianii

Binomial name
- Thermus antranikianii Chung, Rainey, Valente, Nobre, & da Costa, 2000

Species of bacterium

Thermus antranikianii is a bacterium belonging to the Deinococcota phylum, known to be present in hazardous conditions. This species was identified in Iceland, together with Thermus igniterrae.
