= Geovibrio ferrireducens =

Scientific classification
- Domain: Bacteria
- Kingdom: Pseudomonadati
- Phylum: Deferribacterota
- Class: Deferribacteres
- Order: Deferribacterales
- Family: Deferribacteraceae
- Genus: Geovibrio
- Species: G. ferrireducens

Binomial name
- Geovibrio ferrireducens Caccavo et al. 2000

Type strain
- ATCC 51996, PAL-1

Species of bacterium

Geovibrio ferrireducens is a Gram-negative, Fe(III)-reducing, obligately anaerobic and motile bacterium from the genus of Geovibrio.
