= Aqualysin 1 =

Class of enzymes

Identifiers
- EC no.: 3.4.21.111
- CAS no.: 88747-68-6

Databases
- IntEnz: IntEnz view
- BRENDA: BRENDA entry
- ExPASy: NiceZyme view
- KEGG: KEGG entry
- MetaCyc: metabolic pathway
- PRIAM: profile
- PDB structures: RCSB PDB PDBe PDBsum
Search
- PMC: articles
- PubMed: articles
- NCBI: proteins

Aqualysin 1 (EC 3.4.21.111, caldolysin) is an enzyme. This enzyme catalyses the following chemical reaction

Exhibits low specificity towards esters of amino acids with small hydrophobic or aromatic residues at the P1 position

This enzyme is isolated from the thermophile, Thermus aquaticus.
