= Altered Schaedler flora =

The altered Schaedler flora (ASF) is a community of eight bacterial species: two lactobacilli, one Bacteroides, one spiral bacterium of the Flexistipes genus, and four extremely oxygen sensitive (EOS) fusiform-shaped species. The bacteria are selected for their dominance and persistence in the normal microflora of mice, and for their ability to be isolated and grown in laboratory settings. Germ-free animals, mainly mice, are colonized with ASF for the purpose of studying the gastrointestinal (GI) tract. Intestinal mutualistic bacteria play an important role in affecting gene expression of the GI tract, immune responses, nutrient absorption, and pathogen resistance. The standardized microbial cocktail enabled the controlled study of microbe and host interactions, role of microbes, pathogen effects, and intestinal immunity and disease association, such as cancer, inflammatory bowel disease, diabetes, and other inflammatory or autoimmune diseases. Also, compared to germfree animals, ASF mice have fully developed immune system, resistance to opportunistic pathogens, and normal GI function and health, and are a great representation of normal mice.

== History ==
The GI tract is particularly difficult to study due to its complex host-pathogen interaction. With 10^{7}-10^{11} bacteria, 400-plus species, and variations between individuals, there are many complications in the study of a normal gastrointestinal system. For example, it is problematic to assign biological function to specific microbes and community structure, and to investigate the respective immune responses. Furthermore, the varying mice microbiome need to be under controlled conditions for repetitions of the experiments. Germfree mice and specific pathogen free (SPF) mice are helpful in addressing some of the issues, but inadequate in many areas. Germfree mice are not a good representation of normal mice, with issues of enlarged cecum, low reproductive rates, poorly developed immune system, and reduced health. SPF mice still contain varying microbiota, just without certain known pathogen species. There is a need in the scientific field for a known bacterial mixture that is necessary and sufficient for healthy mice.

In the mid-1960s, Russell W. Schaedler, M.D., isolated and grew bacteria from conventional and SPF laboratory mice. Aerobic and less oxygen-sensitive anaerobic bacteria are easy to culture. Fusiform-shaped anaerobes and other EOS bacteria are much more difficult to culture, even though they represent the majority of the normal rodent microbiota. He selected for the bacteria that dominated and can be isolated in culture, and then colonized germfree mice with different bacteria combinations. For example, one combination could include Escherichia coli, Streptococcus fecalis, Lactobacillus acidophilus, L. salivarius, Bacteroides distasonis, and an EOS fusiform-shaped Clostridium spp., . Certain defined microflora are able to restore germfree mice to resemble normal mice with reduced cecal volume, restored reproductive ability, colonization resistance, and well developed immune system. So named Schaedler flora, the defined microflora combinations were widely used in gnotobiotic studies.

In 1978, the National Cancer Institute requested Roger Orcutt of Charles River Laboratories, whose Ph.D. mentor was Dr. Schaedler, to revise a new microflora for standardizing all of its isolator-maintained nuclear stocks and strains of mice. In what was named "the altered Schaedler flora", four bacteria of the original mixture were kept from the original "Schaedler cocktail" microflora: the two Lactobacilli, the Bacteroides, and the EOS fusiform-shaped bacterium. Four more bacteria from the microbiome isolates were added: a spirochete-shaped bacterium and three new EOS fusiform-shaped bacteria. Due to the limited technology of the time, not much was known of the specific bacterial Genus and species. These bacteria are persistent and dominant in normal and SPF mice GI tracts. Confirmation of the correct microbiota presence was limited to looking at the cell Morphology (biology), biochemical traits and growth characteristics

Dr. Orcutt lamented that he would have included the Segmented Filamentous Bacterium of the small intestine of mice in the altered Schaedler flora, which is so intimately involved with the host's immune system, if it could have been cultured in vitro. However, to this day, over 40 years later, it still can only be maintained in vivo and eludes being isolated in pure culture.

== Bacteria ==
With the recent advancement in biotechnology, researchers were able to determine the precise Genus and species of the ASF bacteria using sequence analysis of 16S rRNA. The strains identified are different from the presumptive identities. The distribution of the bacteria species in the gut depends on their need of and aversion to oxygen, flow rate, and substrate abundance, with variability based on age, gender and other microorganisms present in the mice. ASF 360 and ASF 361 are Lactobacilli. Lactobacilli are rod-shaped, Gram-positive, aerotolerant bacteria, and common colonizers of the squamous epithelia of the stomach of mice. ASF 360 was thought to be L. acidophilus. However, 16SrRNA results showed that it is closely related to but distinct from L. acidophilus. ASF 360 is a novel lactobacillus species; clustered with L. acidophilus and L. lactis. ASF 361 has nearly identical 16S rRNA sequences to L. murinus and L. animalis. Both species are routinely found in GI tracts of mice and rats. A thorough examination of the two species and strains is necessary to determine the identity of ASF 361 with more confidence. ASF 361 is completely distinct from the L. salivarius that it was believed to be. ASF 360 and ASF 361 colonize in high numbers in the stomach and then slough off and travel through the small intestine and the cecum.

ASF 519 is related to B. distasonis, the species it was mistaken to be before 16S RNA sequencing was available. However, like the previous bacteria, it is a distinct species by 16S rRNA evidence. Bacteroides species are often found in GI tracts of mammals, and included non-motile, Gram-negative, anaerobic, rod-shaped bacteria. Recently, many of Bacteroides species are being recognized as actually belonging to other genera, like Porphyromonas and Prevotella. In the case of ASF 519, it belongs to the newly named Parabacteroides genus, along with the bacteria formerly known as [B.] distasonis, [B.] merdae, CDC group DF-3, and [B.] forsythus.

The spiral-shaped obligate anaerobe ASF 457 can be found in small amounts in the small intestine, and in high concentration in the large intestine. This bacterium is related to G. ferrireducens, Deferribacter thermophilus, and Flexistipes sinusarabici. ASF 457 is later named Mucispirillum schaedleri. The species is related to the Flexistipes phylum with iron-reducing environmental isolates.

EOS fusiform bacteria make up the great majority of the authocthonous intestinal microbiota, and are mainly found in the large intestine. They vastly outnumber facultative anaerobic and aerobic bacteria. All four fusiform-shaped anaerobes belong to the low G+C content, Gram-positive bacteria group. ASF 356 is of the Clostridium Genus, closely related to Clostridium propionicum. ASF 502 is most related to Ruminococcus gnavus. ASF 492 is confirmed by 16S rRNA sequences as Eubacterium plexicaudatum, and is closely related to Roseburia ceciola. ASF 356, ASF 492, and ASF 502 are all part of the low G+C, Gram-positive bacteria of the Clostridium cluster XIV. ASF 500 is a deeper branch into the low G+C, Gram-positive bacteria of Firmicutes, Bacillus-Clostridium group, but not much can be found in the GenBank database on this branch of Clostridium cluster

== Mouse models ==
Only mice have been colonized with ASF in experiments, since ASF bacteria originate from mice intestinal microbiome. Germfree mice are colonized by ASF through one of two methods. Pure culture of each living ASF bacterium can be grown in anaerobic conditions in laboratory setting. Lactobacilli and Bacteroides are given by gavage to germfree mice first to establish a microbial environment in the GI tract, which then supports the colonization of the spiral-shaped and fusiform bacteria that are given later. An alternative way is to inoculate the drinking water of germfree mice with fresh feces from cecum and colon of gnotobiotic mice (ASF mice), over a period of four days. The establishment and concentration of each bacteria species vary slightly depending on the age, gender, and environmental conditions of the mice.

Experimental results validate the dominance and persistence of the ASF in the colonized mice even after four generations. The mice can be treated in the same standards as germfree mice, such as sterilized water, germfree environment, and careful handling. Although this ensures the definite ASF propagation in mice intestine, it is labor-intensive and not a good representation of physiological conditions. ASF mice can also be raised in the same conditions as normal mice, because they have addressed the immunological, pathological, and physiological weaknesses of the germfree mice. ASF mice can maintain the eight bacteria species under normal conditions. However, variations in strains of the bacteria and introduction of minor amounts of other commensal, mutualist or pathogenic microbes could occur over time. Isogenic mice that cohabit showed little variation in ASF profile, while litter split among different cages showed divergence in bacteria strains. Once the ASF community are established though, it is highly stable over time without environmental or housing perturbation

== Uses in research ==
ASF can be used to study a variety of activities involving the intestinal tract. This includes the study of gut microbiome community, metabolism, immunity, homeostasis, pathogenesis, inflammation, and diseases. Experiments comparing germfree, ASF, and pathogen-infected mice can demonstrate the role of commensals in maintaining the host health.

Intestinal homeostasis is maintained by host-microbe interactions and host immunity. This is critical for digestion of food and protection against pathogens. Bouskra, et al. studied the regulation of intestinal flora and the immune system. They found IgA producing B cells in the Peyer's patches, intestinal lymphoid tissues and follicles, and mesenteric lymph nodes. They used ASF to test the maturation of lymphoid follicles into large B cell clusters by the toll-like receptor signaling. In another study, the innate detection system generates adaptive immune system to maintain intestinal homeostasis. Geuking, et al. examined the role of regulatory T cells in limiting microbe-triggered intestinal inflammation and the T cell compartment. Using ASF, they found intestinal colonization resulted in activation and generation of colonic Treg cells. In germfree mice, Th17 and Th1 response dominate.

Bacteria microenvironment is very important in the pathogenesis of clinical and experimental chronic intestinal inflammation. Whary, et al. examined Helicobacter rodentium infection and the resulting ulcerative typhlocolitis, sepsis, and morbidity. Using ASF mice, they showed a decrease in disease progression due to colonization resistance in the lower bowel from the impacts of normal anaerobic flora. In another summary, Fox examined the relationship between microbiome of the gut and the onset of inflammatory bowel disease (IBD) with the infection of H. bilis. H. bilis is noted to elicit heterologous immune response to lower gut flora, in both activating pro-inflammatory cytokine and dendritic cell activity and probiotic anti-inflammatory activity due to the presentation of mutualist antigens. ASF Lactobacilli and Bacteroides help moderate bowel inflammation in a balanced manner in pathogen infection studies. Beyond the study of bacterial pathogen, microflora community, intestinal immune system interactions and diseases, ASF has been used in experiments examining the transmission of retrovirus. In the paper by Kane, et al., they found the mouse mammary tumor virus is transmitted most efficiently through bacteria colonized mucosal surfaces. The retrovirus evolved to rely on the interaction with microbiota and toll-like receptor to evade immune pathways.

== Problems ==
ASF is not a comprehensive representation of the over 400 diverse bacteria species that normally occupy the mice GI tract. Even in SPF mice, there are many Helicobacter and Filamentous species not included in ASF1. Not to mention the many bacteria that could not be cultured under laboratory settings due to inadequate environment and symbiosis needs. The gut bacteria make up a complex microbial community that supports each other, and the development of the host GI tract and the immune system.

Many bacteria are associated specifically for the production of certain metabolites or signaling pathway that maintains the survival of the microflora. For example, hippurate and chlorogenic acid metabolite level in mice change due to microflora. The synthesis pathway depends on multiple bacteria species, which are not all present in ASF. This limits the bioavailability of nutrients to both host and microbe.

Additional strains of bacteria might need to be added for certain studies with metabolism, pathogenesis, or microbe interactions. It is impossible to study the complete organization of the gut microbiome and all its contributions to the host system, especially with relations to disease development and nutrition, with only eight microbes. Furthermore, there are differences between mice and human microflora. So there are limitations to studies using ASF mice to depict human inflammatory diseases like IBD, arthritis, and cancer. ASF is only a basis for developing hypotheses for mice with complex microflora.

== See also ==
- Microbiome
