= Meiothermus ruber =

Scientific classification
- Domain: Bacteria
- Kingdom: Thermotogati
- Phylum: Deinococcota
- Class: Deinococci
- Order: Thermales
- Family: Thermaceae
- Genus: Meiothermus
- Species: M. ruber

Binomial name
- Meiothermus ruber (Loginova et al. 1984 ex Loginova et al. 1975) Nobre et al. 1996

Type strain
- ATCC 35948; AUCM 1258; DSM 1279; Loginova strain 21; VKM 1258; VKM B-1258

Synonyms
- Thermus ruber (ex Loginova et al. 1975) Loginova et al. 1984

Species of bacterium

Meiothermus ruber is a species of thermophilic bacteria in the genus Meiothermus. First described in 1975 and initially placed in the related genus Thermus, it received its current classification in 1996. Its cells are rod-shaped and non-motile, producing a carotenoid pigment that stains colonies red.

== Taxonomy and classification ==
Meiothermus ruber was first described by a team of microbiologists headed by Lyubov Gavrilovna Loginova in 1975. Initially identified as belonging to the genus Thermus, in 1984 it was given the name Thermus ruber (the species name ruber meaning 'red'). However, in 1996 a team led by M. Fernanda Nobre formally transferred T. ruber, alongside Thermus silvanus and Thermus chliarophilus, to the genus Meiothermus.

== Description ==
Meiothermus ruber cells are gram-negative, non-motile, and rod-shaped, 3–6 by 0.5–0.8 μm in size. They are obligately aerobic and thermophilic, growing at temperatures between 35–40 °C to 70 °C. They grow best at 60–65 °C and form red-colored colonies stained by a carotenoid pigment similar to retro-dehydro-γ-carotene. They derive energy from carbohydrates. Nitrate reduction by the bacteria is rare, though its type strain contains catalase and oxidase. Its type strain is ATCC 37498, while it serves as the type species of Meiothermus.
