= Carboxypeptidase Taq =

Identifiers
- EC no.: 3.4.17.19
- CAS no.: 9031-98-5

Databases
- IntEnz: IntEnz view
- BRENDA: BRENDA entry
- ExPASy: NiceZyme view
- KEGG: KEGG entry
- MetaCyc: metabolic pathway
- PRIAM: profile
- PDB structures: RCSB PDB PDBe PDBsum
Search
- PMC: articles
- PubMed: articles
- NCBI: proteins

Carboxypeptidase Taq (EC 3.4.17.19) is an enzyme. This enzyme catalyses the following chemical reaction

Release of a C-terminal amino acid with broad specificity, except for -Pro

This 56-kDa enzyme is isolated from Thermus aquaticus.
