= Thermus thermophilus =

Scientific classification
- Domain: Bacteria
- Kingdom: Thermotogati
- Phylum: Deinococcota
- Class: Deinococci
- Order: Thermales
- Family: Thermaceae
- Genus: Thermus
- Species: T. thermophilus

Binomial name
- Thermus thermophilus (ex Oshima and Imahori 1974) Manaia et al. 1995

Species of bacterium

Thermus thermophilus is a Gram-negative bacterium used in a range of biotechnological applications, including as a model organism for genetic manipulation, structural genomics, and systems biology. The bacterium is extremely thermophilic, with an optimal growth temperature of about 65 °C (149 °F). Thermus thermophilus was originally isolated from a thermal vent within a hot spring in Izu, Japan by Tairo Oshima and Kazutomo Imahori. The organism has also been found to be important in the degradation of organic materials in the thermogenic phase of composting. T. thermophilus is classified into several strains, of which HB8 and HB27 are the most commonly used in laboratory environments. Genome analyses of these strains were independently completed in 2004. Thermus also displays the highest frequencies of natural transformation known to date.

== Cell structure ==
Thermus thermophilus is a Gram-negative bacterium with an outer membrane that is composed of phospholipids and lipopolysaccharides. This bacterium also has a thin peptidoglycan (also known as murein) layer, in this layer there are 29 muropeptides which account for more than 85% of the total murein layer. The presence of Ala, Glu, Gly, Orn, N-acetyl glucosamine and N-acetylmuramic were found in the murein layer of this bacterium. Another unique feature of this murein layer is that the N-terminal Gly is substituted with phenylacetic acid. This is the first instance of phenylacetic acid found in the murein of bacterial cells. The composition and peptide cross-bridges found in this murein layer are typical of Gram-positive bacterium, but the amount, the degree of the cross-linkage and length of the glycan chain gives this bacterium its Gram-negative properties.

== Survival mechanisms ==
Thermus thermophilus was originally found within a thermal vent in Japan. These bacteria can be found in a variety of geothermal environments. These Thermophiles require a more stringent DNA repair system, as DNA becomes unstable at high temperatures. The GC-content of this bacterium is about 69%, this contributes to the thermostability of this bacterium's genome.

== Strains ==
The two most widely used strains in laboratory settings are HB27 and HB8. The strain HB27 is capable of living in an aerobic or anaerobic environment. It has a genome that consists of a main chromosome (1.89Mb long), as well as a megaplasmid, known as pTT27 (0.23Mb long). The chromosome of HB27 contains 1,968 protein coding genes, with 20% of these genes having no known function. While the megaplasmid contains 230 protein coding genes, about 39% of these genes have no known function.

The strain HB8 is also an aerobic organism and is a model organism for systems biology. It has a genome consisting of a plasmid, known as pTT8 (9.3kb long), that is coupled with a chromosome (1.85Mb), as well as a megaplasmid, also known as pTT27 (0.26Mb). This strain was found to be a polyploid organism, with a chromosome and megaplasmid copy number of about four to five.

== Applications ==
DNA polymerase I, thermostable

Identifiers
- Organism: Thermus thermophilus (strain ATCC 27634 / DSM 579 / HB8)
- Symbol: polA
- UniProt: P52028
Search for
- Structures: Swiss-model
- Domains: InterPro

rTth DNA polymerase is a recombinant thermostable DNA polymerase derived from Thermus thermophilus HB8, with optimal activity at 70-80 °C, used in some PCR applications. The enzyme possesses efficient reverse transcriptase activity in the presence of manganese. This enzyme is beneficial for amplification of GC-rich targets and for crude samples. It can be used in applications of PCR, RT-PCR and also primer extension. This polymerase has been shown to be resistant to DNA polymerase inhibitors present in clinical samples, it also has the capacity to detect RNA in the presence of inhibitors. Under the presence of inhibitors, it was shown to detect this RNA at a comparable level with its capacity to detect DNA.
