= ASF =

ASF may refer to:

== Arts and entertainment ==
- Alabama Shakespeare Festival, a drama festival
- Asimov's Science Fiction, a U.S.-based English-language science fiction magazine containing SF stories

== Science and technology ==
=== Biological ===
- African swine fever virus (ASFV), the causative agent of African swine fever (ASF)
- Altered Schaedler flora, a standardized consortium of gastrointestinal microbial species
- Serine/arginine-rich splicing factor 1, a protein also known as alternative splicing factor 1 (ASF)

=== Computing ===
- Advanced Synchronization Facility, a proposed extension to the x86 instruction set architecture
- Advanced Systems Format (formerly "Advanced Streaming Format", .asf), a Microsoft streaming format
- Alert Standard Format, a protocol for remote management and control of systems in OS-absent environments
- Anti Spam Filtering, software and hardware protection layers used to fight email spam
- Apache Software Foundation, an umbrella non-profit organization that owns the Apache brandname
- APL (programming language) data files (file extension .asf)
- Atmel Software Framework, a set of source files, libraries and reference projects that aid in application development for Atmel microcontrollers

=== Other uses ===
- Acrylic silicone fluoropolymer, a car wax chemical
- Air superiority fighter
- Alaska Satellite Facility, a NASA data center
- Amperes per square foot, a unit of current density often used in electroplating

== Organizations ==
- Acid Survivors Foundation, in Bangladesh
- Airports Security Force, an aviation security division in Pakistan
- African Standby Force, an international peace force controlled by the African Union
- The American-Scandinavian Foundation, a non-profit organization
- The American Sephardi Federation, a non-profit Jewish organization
- American Steel Foundries,
- Army Service Forces, a 1940s-era US military command, distinct from the Army Air Forces or Army Ground Forces
- ASF Mexico (American School Foundation, A.C.)
- Asian Sailing Federation
- Australian Softball Federation
- Australian Speleological Federation, a caving body in Australia
- Autism Science Foundation, a US non-profit organization
- Avocats Sans Frontières, an international non-governmental organization
- Romanian Financial Supervisory Authority (Romanian: Autoritatea de Supraveghere Financiară)
- Superior Auditor of the Federation (Spanish: Auditoría Superior de la Federación)
- Swiss Football Association (French: Association Suisse de Football and Italian: Associazione Svizzera di Football)

== Other uses ==
- Animal source foods, food items that come from an animal source
- alt.seduction.fast, a Usenet group
- Ashfield railway station, Glasgow, Scotland, National Rail designation
- Narimanovo Airport, Astrakhan, Russia, IATA code
