= Incendiamoeba cascadensis =

Scientific classification
- Domain: Eukaryota
- Supergroup: Amorphea
- Phylum: Amoebozoa
- Class: Tubulinea
- Order: Echinamoebida
- Family: Vermamoebidae
- Genus: Incendiamoeba; Rappaport et al. 2026
- Species: I. cascadensis

Binomial name
- Incendiamoeba cascadensis Rappaport et al. 2026

Species of protist

Incendiamoeba cascadensis, commonly referred to as the fire amoeba, is a species of thermophilic single-celled eukaryote classified within the clade Amoebozoa. Discovered in samples taken from a geothermal stream within the Cascade Range, I. cascadensis is recognized for setting the upper temperature threshold for replication and growth in eukaryotic life.

== Taxonomy and classification ==
Incendiamoeba cascadensis was first isolated by a team of microbiologists led by H. Beryl Rappaport from water samples taken at Lassen Volcanic National Park in California, United States, between 2023 and 2025. After culturing and isolating the amoeba, phylogenomic analysis showed that it fell within clade Echinamoebida and family Vermamoebidae, as sister to Vermamoeba vermiformis. The researchers proposed classifying the newly discovered amoeba in a new genus Incendiamoeba as species cascadensis. The genus name Incendiamoeba is derived from Latin incendarius ("igniting fire") and the species name refers to the Cascade Range where it was discovered.

== Description ==
I. cascadensis has two distinct forms: an elongated, worm-shaped (vermiform) form similar to that of V. vermiformis, and a more compact amoeboid form with pseudopodia. It measures about 38.7±9.4 μm in the vermiform state and 23.5±7.9 μm in the amoeboid state. Above 64 °C, it forms compact cysts 5–15 μm in size. It typically has one nucleus, which in the vermiform state is biased towards the direction of movement. Compared to V. vermiformis, I. cascadensis has similar motility, though it forms smaller, briefer surface attachments.

=== Heat tolerance ===
I. cascadensis is a thermophile, proliferating at temperatures beyond what was thought possible for eukaryotes. It grows at 60 °C, the previously defined temperature limit for eukaryote replication. It is able to grow up to a maximum temperature of 63 °C. It grows most robustly at 55–57 °C. Like other heat-tolerant amoebae, it is able to recover from encystment at temperatures above its replication limit once conditions become favorable again; cells were observed to recover from heating to 70 °C, but not 80 °C.

To tolerate high temperatures, I. cascadensis employs several adaptations. Signalling pathways including calcium, mitogen-activated protein kinase, and Ras proteins are enriched in the amoeba. Enriched calcium signalling can initiate protective responses to heat stress by altering lipid metabolism. Genes encoding small heat shock proteins, which prevent protein aggregation and assists in refolding, are also enriched. At high temperatures, pathways for membrane vesicle trafficking and DNA repair are upregulated, while energy and biosynthesis pathways were downregulated. Cells of I. cascadensis have fewer hydrophobic amino acids on their surface, possibly to prevent protein clumping. Like in other thermophilic organisms, positively-charged surface residues are enriched while negatively-charged surface residues are less common, indicating potential convergent evolution.

== Habitat and ecology ==
Incendiamoeba cascadensis grows in geothermal stream environments, completing its life cycle at high temperatures. It appears to preferentially feed on filamentous bacteria. During feeding, it protrudes a phagocytic structure that envelopes its prey, which bends and folds bacterial cells. Its primary prey is the cosmopolitan geothermal bacterium Meiothermus ruber.
