= Calditerrivibrio =

Scientific classification
- Domain: Bacteria
- Kingdom: Pseudomonadati
- Phylum: Deferribacterota
- Class: Deferribacteres
- Order: Deferribacterales
- Family: Deferribacteraceae
- Genus: Calditerrivibrio; Iino et al. 2008

Type species
- Calditerrivibrio nitroreducens Iino et al. 2008

Species
- C. nitroreducens

Genus of bacteria

Calditerrivibrio is a genus of bacteria from the family of Deferribacteraceae with one known species (Calditerrivibrio nitroreducens). Calditerrivibrio nitroreducens has been isolated from a hot spring from Yumata in Japan.

== See also ==
- List of bacterial orders
- List of bacteria genera
