= Denitrovibrio =

Scientific classification
- Domain: Bacteria
- Kingdom: Pseudomonadati
- Phylum: Deferribacterota
- Class: Deferribacteres
- Order: Deferribacterales
- Family: Deferribacteraceae
- Genus: Denitrovibrio; Myhr & Torsvik 2000

Type species
- Denitrovibrio acetiphilus Myhr & Torsvik 2000

Species
- D. acetiphilus

Genus of bacteria

Denitrovibrio is a Gram-negative, mesophilic and obligately anaerobic genus of bacteria from the family of Deferribacteraceae with one known species (Denitrovibrio acetiphilus). The complete genome of Denitrovibrio acetiphilus is sequenced.

== See also ==
- List of bacterial orders
- List of bacteria genera
