= Deinobacterium =

Scientific classification
- Domain: Bacteria
- Kingdom: Thermotogati
- Phylum: Deinococcota
- Class: Deinococci
- Order: Deinococcales
- Family: Deinococcaceae
- Genus: Deinobacterium; Ekman et al. 2011

Type species
- Deinobacterium chartae Ekman et al. 2011

Species
- D. chartae

Genus of bacteria

Deinobacterium is a genus in the Deinococcota phylum (Bacteria). Not to be confused with Deinobacter, a disused name for Deinococcus.

== Etymology ==
The name Deinobacterium derives from:
Greek adjective deinos (δεινός), dreadful, strange; Neo-Latin neuter gender noun bacterium, nominally meaning "a rod", but in effect meaning a bacterium; Neo-Latin masculine gender noun Deinobacterium, strange bacterium.

== Species ==
The genus contains a single species, namely D. chartae ( Ekman et al. 2011, (Type species of the genus).; Latin genitive case noun chartae, of/from paper.) This bacterium is:

- rod-shaped
- non-spore-forming
- non-motile, aerobic
- oxidase and catalase-positive
- radiation-resistant bacterium
- pale pink colonies on oligotrophic medium at 12 to 50 °C (optimum 37 to 45 °C) and at pH 6 to 10.3
- peptidoglycan type A3β with L-Orn–Gly–Gly
- quinone: MK-8
- CG 67%
- isolated from biofilm collected from a Finnish paper mill

== See also ==
- List of Bacteria genera
- List of bacterial orders
