= Geovibrio thiophilus =

Scientific classification
- Domain: Bacteria
- Kingdom: Pseudomonadati
- Phylum: Deferribacterota
- Class: Deferribacteres
- Order: Deferribacterales
- Family: Deferribacteraceae
- Genus: Geovibrio
- Species: G. thiophilus

Binomial name
- Geovibrio thiophilus Janssen et al. 2002

Type strain
- AAFu3, ATCC BAA-311, DSM 11263

Synonyms
- Geovibrio agilis

Species of bacterium

Geovibrio thiophilus is a Gram-negative, non-spore-forming and sulfur-reducing bacterium from the genus of Geovibrio which has been isolated from a drainage ditch in Konstanz in Germany.
