= Deferribacter =

Scientific classification
- Domain: Bacteria
- Kingdom: Pseudomonadati
- Phylum: Deferribacterota
- Class: Deferribacteres
- Order: Deferribacterales
- Family: Deferribacteraceae
- Genus: Deferribacter; Greene et al. 1997

Type species
- Deferribacter thermophilus Greene et al. 1997

Species
- D. abyssi; D. autotrophicus; D. desulfuricans; D. thermophilus

Genus of bacteria

Deferribacter is a genus in the phylum Deferribacterota (Bacteria).

== Etymology ==
The name Deferribacter derives from:
Latin pref. de-, from; Latin noun ferrum, iron; Neo-Latin masculine gender noun, a rodbacter, nominally meaning "a rod", but in effect meaning a bacterium, rod; Neo-Latin masculine gender noun Deferribacter, rod that reduces iron.

== Species ==
The genus contains 4 species, namely

- D. abyssi Miroshnichenko et al. 2003; (Latin genitive case noun abyssi, of immense depths, living in the depths of the ocean.)
- D. autotrophicus Slobodkina et al. 2009; (Neo-Latin masculine gender adjective autotrophicus, autotrophic.)
- D. desulfuricans Takai et al. 2003; (Neo-Latin participle adjective desulfuricans, reducing sulfur.)
- D. thermophilus Greene et al. 1997 ((Type species of the genus).; Greek noun thermē (θέρμη), heat; Neo-Latin masculine gender adjective philus (from Greek masculine gender adjective φίλος), friend, loving; Neo-Latin masculine gender adjective thermophilus, heat loving.)

== Phylogeny ==
The currently accepted taxonomy is based on the List of Prokaryotic names with Standing in Nomenclature (LPSN) and National Center for Biotechnology Information (NCBI).

16S rRNA based LTP_10_2024

- Deferribacter
  - - D. abyssi Miroshnichenko et al. 2003
    - D. autotrophicus Slobodkina et al. 2009
  - - D. desulfuricans Takai et al. 2003
    - D. thermophilus Greene et al. 1997

120 marker proteins based GTDB 10-RS226

- Deferribacter
  - D. autotrophicus
  - D. desulfuricans

== See also ==
- Bacterial taxonomy
- Microbiology
- List of bacterial orders
- List of bacteria genera
