= Deferribacter desulfuricans =

Scientific classification
- Domain: Bacteria
- Kingdom: Pseudomonadati
- Phylum: Deferribacterota
- Class: Deferribacteres
- Order: Deferribacterales
- Family: Deferribacteraceae
- Genus: Deferribacter
- Species: D. desulfuricans

Binomial name
- Deferribacter desulfuricans Takai et al. 2003

Species of bacterium

Deferribacter desulfuricans is a species of sulfur-, nitrate- and arsenate-reducing thermophile first isolated from a deep-sea hydrothermal vent. It is an anaerobic, heterotrophic thermophile with type strain SSM1^{T} (=JCM 11476^{T} =DSM 14783^{T}).

== Genome structure ==
Deferribacter desulfuricans genome contains 2,23 Mbp with 2,184 protein coding genes.
