= Meiothermus =

Scientific classification
- Domain: Bacteria
- Kingdom: Thermotogati
- Phylum: Deinococcota
- Class: Deinococci
- Order: Thermales
- Family: Thermaceae
- Genus: Meiothermus; Nobre et al. 1996 emend. Albuquerque et al. 2009

Type species
- Meiothermus ruber (Loginova et al. 1984) Nobre et al. 1996

Species
- M. cateniformans; M. cerbereus; M. granaticius; M. hypogaeus; M. luteus; "M. rosaceus"; M. ruber; M. rufus; M. taiwanensis

Genus of bacteria

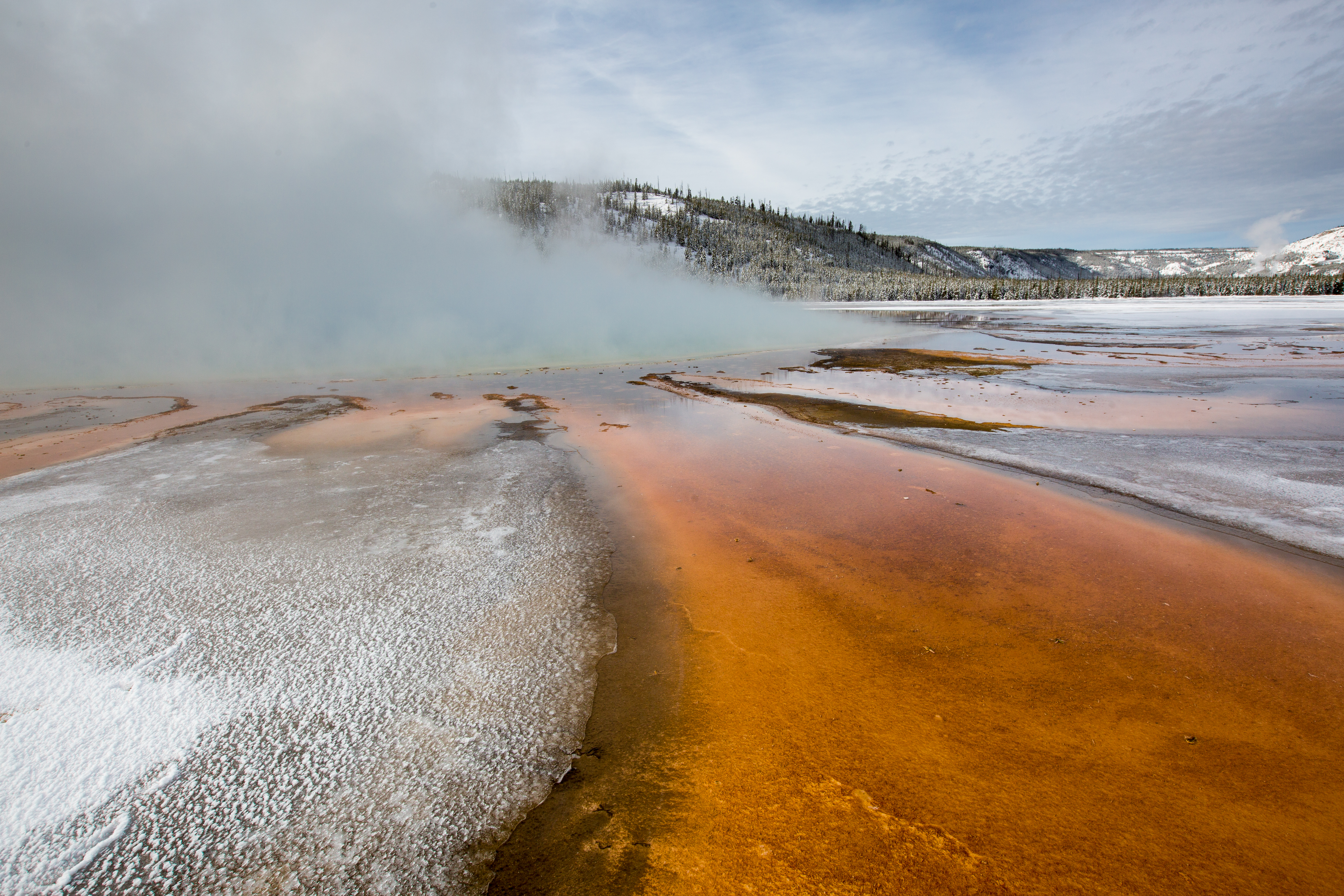
Thermophiles at Grand Prismatic Spring

Meiothermus is a genus of Deinococcota bacteria. Members of Meiothermus can be reliably distinguished from other genera in the family Thermaceae as well as all other bacteria by the presence of three conserved signature indels (CSIs) found in the proteins: 5-methyltetrahydrofolate–homocysteine methyltransferase, cadmium transporter and polynucleotide phosphorylase and are exclusively shared by species of this genus. Meiothermus is also different than the Thermus genus, which it was originally a member of, in their optimum growth temperatures, with Meiothermus being able to grow in colder environments. Meiothermus was first isolated with Thermus in alkaline and neutral hot springs in Kamchatka, Russia and Yellowstone National Park, USA.

== Characteristics ==
Meiothermus species of bacteria are gram-negative and are primarily chemoorganoheterotrophs, and some species can use nitrate as an electron acceptor. The Meiothermus genus was originally proposed to group together several moderately thermophilic organisms that were in the Thermus genus. It was later differentiated and made its own genus. Meiothermus are mostly distinguishable from Thermus by the lower bound of their optimum growth temperatures, 50-60 °C for Meiothermus and 70 °C for Thermus. Also, in Meiothermus, the presence of two glycolipid bands is seen whereas Thermus species only contain one. Thermus also contains eight conserved signature indels (CSIs) compared to the three that Meiothermus has. The optimal pH range for Meiothermus growth is in the range of 7.5–9.5. Meiothermus is a genus of bacteria that can only exist in aerobic environments. Most Meiothermus species have a red pigmentation with the exception of M. chilarophilus which has a yellow color. Some Meiothermus species can also form biofilms and stick to surfaces using specific adhesion organelles.

== Habitats ==
Meiothermus is a thermophilic genus of bacteria. Thermophiles are strains of bacteria that exist in environments that range from 45 °C to around 80 °C. Meiothermus in particular is best suited to ranges of 50–60 °C. Meiothermus is a strictly aerobic bacteria, needing oxygen for many of its processes.

They also live inside the gut of some Antarctic polychaete worms (Leitoscoloplos geminus, Aphelochaeta palmeri, and Aglaophamus trissophyllus), where they make up a significant part of the worms' microbiome and produce antifreeze proteins that prevents ice formation within their cells and tissues.

== Metabolism ==
Some species of Meiothermus have the ability to break down keratin at much a rate much higher than natural rates. These keratinolytic processes performed by Meiothermus species like the common M. ruber lead to production of amino acids that can be used by the environment. Meiothermus can use other organic substrates like starch, disaccharides, amino acids and others as a carbon and energy source.

== Phylogeny ==
The currently accepted taxonomy is based on the List of Prokaryotic names with Standing in Nomenclature (LPSN) and National Center for Biotechnology Information (NCBI).

16S rRNA based LTP_07_2026

- Meiothermus
  - M. luteus Habib et al. 2017
  - - - M. rufus Albuquerque et al. 2010
      - - M. granaticius Albuquerque et al. 2010
        - M. hypogaeus Mori et al. 2012
    - - - M. cerbereus Chung et al. 1997
        - M. ruber (Loginova et al. 1984) Nobre et al. 1996
      - - M. cateniformans Zhang et al. 2010
        - M. taiwanensis Chen et al. 2002

120 marker proteins based GTDB 11-RS232

- Meiothermus
  - M. granaticius
  - - - M. luteus
      - M. rufus
    - - M. hypogaeus
      - - M. cerbereus
        - - M. ruber
          - M. taiwanensis [incl. M. cateniformans]

Species incertae sedis:

- "Meiothermus rosaceus" Chen et al. 2002

== See also ==
- List of bacteria genera
- List of bacterial orders
