= Geovibrio =

Scientific classification
- Domain: Bacteria
- Kingdom: Pseudomonadati
- Phylum: Deferribacterota
- Class: Deferribacteres
- Order: Deferribacterales
- Family: Deferribacteraceae
- Genus: Geovibrio; Caccavo et al. 2000

Type species
- Geovibrio ferrireducens Caccavo et al. 2000

Species
- G. ferrireducens; G. thiophilus

Genus of bacteria

Geovibrio is a Gram-negative, non-spore-forming, strictly anaerobic and motile genus of bacteria from the family of Deferribacteraceae.

== Phylogeny ==
The currently accepted taxonomy is based on the List of Prokaryotic names with Standing in Nomenclature (LPSN) and National Center for Biotechnology Information (NCBI).

16S rRNA based LTP_10_2024

- Geovibrio
  - G. ferrireducens Caccavo et al. 2000
  - G. thiophilus Janssen et al. 2002

120 marker proteins based GTDB 10-RS226

- Geovibrio
  - G. ferrireducens
  - G. thiophilus

== See also ==
- List of bacterial orders
- List of bacteria genera
