= Deferribacter thermophilus =

Scientific classification
- Domain: Bacteria
- Kingdom: Pseudomonadati
- Phylum: Deferribacterota
- Class: Deferribacteres
- Order: Deferribacterales
- Family: Deferribacteraceae
- Genus: Deferribacter
- Species: D. thermophilus

Binomial name
- Deferribacter thermophilus Greene et al. 1997

Species of bacterium

Deferribacter thermophilus is an iron-reducing bacteria. It is a manganese- and iron-reducing bacterium. It is thermophilic and anaerobic bacterium, its type strain being designated as strain BMAT. The cells are straight to bent rods (1 to 5 by 0.3 to 0.5 μm).
