= Thermotoga lettingae =

Scientific classification
- Domain: Bacteria
- Kingdom: Thermotogati
- Phylum: Thermotogota
- Class: Thermotogae
- Order: Thermotogales
- Family: Thermotogaceae
- Genus: Thermotoga
- Species: T. lettingae

Binomial name
- Thermotoga lettingae Balk et al. 2002

Species of bacterium

Thermotoga lettingae is a thermophilic, anaerobic, non-spore-forming, motile and Gram-negative bacterium, with type strain TMO^{T}.
