= Symbiobacterium thermophilum =

Scientific classification
- Domain: Bacteria
- Kingdom: Bacillati
- Phylum: Bacillota
- Class: Clostridia
- Order: Eubacteriales
- Family: Symbiobacteriaceae
- Genus: Symbiobacterium
- Species: S. thermophilum

Binomial name
- Symbiobacterium thermophilum Ohno et al. 2000

Species of bacterium

Symbiobacterium thermophilum is a symbiotic thermophile that depends on co-culture with a Bacillus strain for growth. It is Gram-negative and tryptophanase-positive, with type strain T(T) (= IAM 14863^{T}). It is the type species of its genus. Symbiobacterium is related to the Gram-positive Bacillota and Actinomycetota, but belongs to a lineage that is distinct from both.S. thermophilum has a bacillus shaped cell structure with no flagella. This bacterium is located throughout the environment in soils and fertilizers.

== Cell structure ==
Although Gram staining S. thermophilum shows a negative lab result, there are key Gram-negative membrane biosynthesis proteins that it lacks, such as LPS:glycosyltransferase and polysaccharide transporters. Instead, the cell structure of S. thermophilum includes proteins STH61, 969, 1321, 2197, 2492, and 3168 which are associated with the enveloped S-layer bacteria. The bacillus shape of S. thermophilum cells may be caused by the mreBCD (STH372-4) gene, located adjacent to the min locus. Although it has no flagella, the genome of S. thermophilum does include a flagella biosynthesis gene cluster. S. thermophilum is found to produce endospores in specific conditions. There is less research on the spore-like structure of S. thermophilum as it is the rarer form.

== Genome structure ==
Its genome has been sequenced, and has a size of 3.57 Mbp, with 3338 protein-coding genes. Characteristics of S. thermophilum such as the production of tryptophanase and β-tyrosinase, the cell surface structure, and a negative gram stain results indicate that the bacteria is Gram-negative. However, the sequence of 16S rRNA gene led to the complete phylogenic analysis of S. thermophilum, concluding it was in fact Gram-positive. High-G+C content (68.7%) along with its Gram stain results indicates that S. thermophilum belongs to the Actinomyces phylum, but the genome and proteins are more closely related to the Firmicutes, a Gram-positive phylum with low-G+C content. S. thermophilum further defies the knowledge that endospore forming genes are unique to the Bacillus-Clostridium group, showing genes involved in the formation of endospores. Sequencing of proteins proved biological roles in 2,082 of the 3,338 CDSs. The genome of S. thermophilum is not even partially alike other prokaryotic genomes sequenced at this point in time, as indicated by a CDS similarity matrix search.

== Growth ==
Symbiobacterium thermophilum depends on other strains of Bacillus to grow, in a co-culture mechanism. This is known as microbial commensalism and often occurs in composts. S. thermophilum is one of many cultures that arise from compost derivatives. Under optimal conditions, the growth rate maximizes at 5x10^8 cells/mL.

== Metabolism ==
Symbiobacterium thermophilum uses the non-oxidative branch of the pentose-phosphate glycolytic pathway for metabolism. Despite not using the Entner-Doudoroff pathway and lacking both cellulose-degrading and amylose-degrading enzymes, it has the genes and ability to metabolize glycerol, gluconate, cellobiose, N-acetylgalactosamine, tyrosine, and tryptophan. S. thermophilum contains genes for ferredoxin oxidoreductases, pyruvate, and 2-oxoacid. S. thermophilum lacks the genes for methionine and lysine biosynthesis but has the enzymes that are utilized to biosynthesize amino acids.

== Respiration ==
The variety of respiratory enzymes possessed by S. thermophilum enables the bacterium to grow in both aerobic and anaerobic conditions. The ability to grow in both aerobic and anaerobic conditions is indicated by the presence of both aerobic glycerol-3-phosphate dehydrogenase and anaerobic glycerol-3-phosphate dehydrogenase. The presence of the Nap nitrate reductase gene cluster and Nar nitrate reductase suggest that S. thermophilum utilizes nitrate respiration.

== Habitat ==
Due to the thermophilic nature of S. thermophilum, areas that are ideal for the survival of the bacteria would be ones that have increased temperatures and are nutrient dense. The habitats that are most suited for S. thermophilum would be in the intestinal tract of animals and also in composts. This is because both of those areas contain the essentials for the bacteria to survive.

== Distribution and diversity ==
Symbiobacterium thermophilum is a bacterium that is widely distributed throughout the environment. It can be found in many different types of soil and fertilizers that contain animal feces, as well as inside animal intestines, and in the feed that is given to the animals. To determine the distribution of S. thermophilum, tests were done to check for growth of the bacterium and whether or not the item being tested contained tryptophanase.

In a study done at the Department of Applied Biological Sciences in Nihon University, Fujisawa, Japan, there was a random sample of Symbiobacterium that was cloned and it determined that out of the 31 samples taken, 16 of the cases showed that the sample had a more diverse genetic structure, whereas the other 15 samples had less diverse genetics due to the results showing that the genetics were almost identical to S. thermophilum.
