= Mycoplasma mobile =

Scientific classification
- Domain: Bacteria
- Kingdom: Bacillati
- Phylum: Mycoplasmatota
- Class: Mollicutes
- Order: Mycoplasmatales
- Family: Mycoplasmataceae
- Genus: Mycoplasma
- Species: M. mobile

Binomial name
- Mycoplasma mobile Kirchhoff et al. 1987

Species of bacterium

Mycoplasma mobile is a species of parasitic bacteria that binds to the gills of freshwater fish causing necrosis. It belongs to the class of Mollicutes which includes bacteria featuring reduced genome sizes that may be parasitic or commensal. It is a gram positive bacterium, however its cells lack a peptidoglycan layer. M. mobile cells are covered with membrane- anchored proteins, including surface proteins responsible for adhesion, or attachment to objects and surfaces, and antigenic variation, a mechanism which enables surface proteins to elude host immune responses. M. mobile survival is dependent upon surface proteins which allow it to bind and infect host cells, vary its own surface proteins in order to escape the host immune system, and transport nutrients and ions.

== Structure ==
The M. mobile cell is divided into three parts: the head, neck, and body. The proteins involved in gliding and adhesion, named Gli123, Gli349, and Gli521, are found at the neck. On the surface of M. mobile lies variable surface proteins (Mvsps) made up of 11 genes including mvspA and mvspP. These proteins are considered to be involved in the parasitism of M. mobile. The lack of a peptidoglycan layer within M. mobile creates a flexible cell wall, enabling the bacterium to form a protrusion and glide in a smooth manner. As a result of this cell wall structure, M. mobile is the fastest moving mycoplasma species recorded.

== Gliding direction ==
Mycoplasma mobile moves in a gliding manner along a curved path in the direction of the cell protrusion, otherwise known as the cell pole. The protrusion of the cell, which extends from the cell membrane and consists of hundreds of miniature legs which attach to distant cells, pulls the M. mobile. The gliding machinery, consisting of a large structure of surface proteins, forms at the protrusion. The legs, which are approximately 50-nm long, are protein molecules on the cell surface that aid the cell's motility. This process enables M. mobile to move and releases sialylated oligosaccharides (carbohydrates that have reacted with sialic acid) onto the surface of the object in which the cell attaches to. The proteins on the surface of M. mobile then pull the sialylated oligosaccharides on the foreign cell surface through the use of energy obtained from ATP hydrolysis. Through the use of this action M. mobile is recorded to move 2.0 to 4.5 μm per second on solid surfaces. At this speed, the M. mobile is moving 3 to 7 times the length of the cell per second.

== Studies ==
Studies of M. mobile began in 1997, and new research is continually occurring. Many studies involving the individual proteins on the surface of M. mobile have been conducted, however, a detailed image of the complete cell surface has yet to be produced.
