= Truepera =

Scientific classification
- Domain: Bacteria
- Kingdom: Thermotogati
- Phylum: Deinococcota
- Class: Deinococci
- Order: Deinococcales
- Family: Trueperaceae
- Genus: Truepera; Albuquerque et al. 2005

Type species
- Truepera radiovictrix Albuquerque et al. 2005

Species
- T. radiovictrix

Genus of bacteria

Truepera is the only genus of bacteria in the family Trueperaceae from the phylum Deinococcota. It has one species, Truepera radiovictrix.

The following points accounts for the characteristics of the only known species:

- These strains form orange/red colonies and have spherical-shaped cells.
- Optimum growth temperature of about 50 °C.
- Optimum pH for growth between about 7.5 and 9.5, and do not grow at pH below 6.5 or above pH 11.2.
- They are extremely resistant to ionizing radiation. For instance up to 60% of the cells can survive even after being exposed to 5.0 kGy
- These strains are chemo-organotrophic and aerobic; do not grow in Thermus medium under anaerobic conditions with or without nitrate as electron acceptor and glucose as a source of carbon and energy, but ferment glucose to d-lactate without formation of gas. They assimilate a large variety of sugars, organic acids and amino acids.

The sole species of this genus, Truepera radiovictrix, can be distinguished from other Deinococci as well as all other bacteria by the presence of five conserved signature indels (CSIs) exclusively found in this species in the proteins such as chorismate synthase and CTP synthetase.

== See also ==
- List of bacterial orders
- List of bacteria genera
