= Mucispirillum =

Scientific classification
- Domain: Bacteria
- Kingdom: Pseudomonadati
- Phylum: Deferribacterota
- Class: Deferribacteres
- Order: Deferribacterales
- Family: Deferribacteraceae
- Genus: Mucispirillum; Robertson et al. 2005

Type species
- Mucispirillum schaedleri Robertson et al. 2005

Species
- "Ca. M. faecigallinarum"; M. schaedleri

Genus of bacteria

Mucispirillum is a genus in the phylum Deferribacterota (Bacteria). It is represented by the single species Mucispirillum schaedleri|. It has been found in the intestinal tract of some rodents and considered a commensal with some association to disease. This species has been found in cockroaches mice, turkeys, dogs, pigs, goats, termites, and sometimes humans. It is anaerobic and does not form spores. It is motile, flagellated and thought to have the ability to move through mucus.

== Etymology ==
The name Mucispirillum derives from Latin noun mucus, mucus; Neo-Latin dim. neuter gender noun spirillum, a small spiral; Neo-Latin neuter gender noun mucispirillum, a small spiral rod of the mucus.

== Phylogeny ==
The currently accepted taxonomy is based on the List of Prokaryotic names with Standing in Nomenclature (LPSN) and National Center for Biotechnology Information (NCBI).

16S rRNA based LTP_10_2024

- Mucispirillum
  - M. schaedleri Robertson et al. 2005

120 marker proteins based GTDB 10-RS226

- Mucispirillum
  - "Ca. M. faecigallinarum" Gilroy et al. 2021
  - M. schaedleri Robertson et al. 2005

== Species ==
This genus contains a single species, namely M. schaedleri (Robertson et al. 2005, (Type species of the genus).; Neo-Latin genitive case noun schaedleri, of Schaedler, in honour of Russell Schaedler, active in the study of the bacteria of the intestinal tract of mammals.

== See also ==
- Bacterial taxonomy
- Microbiology
- List of bacterial orders
- List of bacteria genera
