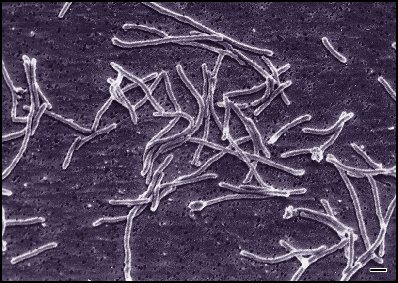
- Thermus aquaticus

Scientific classification
- Domain: Bacteria
- Kingdom: Thermotogati
- Phylum: Deinococcota
- Class: Deinococci
- Order: Thermales
- Family: Thermaceae
- Genus: Thermus; Brock & Freeze 1969

Type species
- Thermus aquaticus Brock & Freeze 1969

Species
- See text

= Thermus =

Genus of bacteria

Thermus is a genus of thermophilic bacteria. It is one of several bacteria belonging to the Deinococcota phylum. According to comparative analysis of 16S rRNA, this is one of the most ancient group of bacteria. Thermus species can be distinguished from other genera in the family Thermaceae as well as all other bacteria by the presence of eight conserved signature indels found in proteins such as adenylate kinase and replicative DNA helicase as well as 14 conserved signature proteins that are exclusively shared by members of this genus.

== Phylogeny ==
The currently accepted taxonomy is based on the List of Prokaryotic names with Standing in Nomenclature (LPSN) and the National Center for Biotechnology Information (NCBI).

Between all its species, T. thermophilus has a special importance as a model organism for basic and applied research. The species T. aquaticus is likewise well known for its role in the development of PCR.

16S rRNA based LTP_07_2026

- Thermus
  - T. filiformis Hudson et al. 1987
  - - T. oshimai Williams et al. 1996
    - - - T. composti Vajna et al. 2012
        - - "T. parvatiensis" Dwivedi et al. 2015
          - T. thermophilus (ex Oshima and Imahori 1974) Manaia et al. 1995
      - - - T. thalpophilus Li et al. 2023
          - - T. brockianus Williams et al. 1995
            - T. hydrothermalis Li et al. 2023
        - - - - T. aquaticus Brock and Freeze 1969
              - T. sediminis Zhou et al. 2021
            - - T. arciformis Zhang et al. 2010
              - T. islandicus Bjornsdottir et al. 2009
          - - T. igniterrae Chung et al. 2000
            - - T. thermamylovorans Ming et al. 2020
              - - T. caliditerrae Ming et al. 2014
                - - T. tengchongensis Yu et al. 2013
                  - - T. amyloliquefaciens Yu et al. 2015
                    - - T. tenuipuniceus Zhou et al. 2019
                      - - - T. antranikianii Chung et al. 2000
                          - - T. caldilimi Li et al. 2021
                            - T. scotoductus Kristjansson et al. 1994
                        - - T. neutrinimicus Li et al. 2023
                          - - T. caldifontis Khan et al. 2017
                            - - T. albus Li et al. 2023
                              - T. altitudinis Li et al. 2023

120 marker proteins based GTDB 11-RS232

- Thermus
  - T. filiformis
  - - T. oshimai
    - - - T. composti
        - - "T. parvatiensis"
          - T. thermophilus
      - - - T. thalpophilus
          - - T. brockianus
            - T. hydrothermalis
        - - - - T. arciformis
              - T. islandicus
            - - T. aquaticus
              - T. sediminis
          - - T. igniterrae
            - - T. thermamylovorans
              - - T. caliditerrae
                - - T. tengchongensis
                  - - T. amyloliquefaciens
                    - - T. tenuipuniceus
                      - - - T. antranikianii [incl. T. brevis Hu et al. 2022]
                          - - T. caldifontis
                            - T. scotoductus
                        - - T. neutrinimicus
                          - - T. caldilimi
                            - - T. albus
                              - T. altitudinis

Species incertae sedis:

- "T. anatoliensis" Kacagan et al. 2016
- "T. caldophilus" Taguchi et al. 1983
- "T. eggertssonii" Peters 2008
- T. javaensis Ningsih et al. 2026
- "T. kawarayensis" Kurosawa, Itoh & Itoh 2005
- "T. murrieta" Benner et al. 2006
- "T. nonproteolyticus" 1992
- "T. rehai" Lin et al. 2002
- "T. yunnanensis" Gong et al. 2005

== Habitats ==
The strains of the genus Thermus are generally isolated from hydrothermal areas where the range of water temperature is 55–70 °C and that of pH is 5.0–10.5.

The first isolate of the genus Thermus was isolated from hydrothermal areas in Yellowstone National Park. Later on more isolates were obtained from several hydrothermal areas worldwide, such as in Japan, Iceland, New Zealand, New Mexico or the Australian Artesian Basin.

== See also ==
- Bacteria
- Biotechnology
- Thermophiles
- Geyser
- List of bacteria genera
- List of bacterial orders
