= Deferribacteraceae =

- Deferrivibrio metallireducens

Scientific classification
- Domain: Bacteria
- Kingdom: Pseudomonadati
- Phylum: Deferribacterota; Garrity and Holt 2021
- Class: Deferribacteres; Huber and Stetter 2002
- Order: Deferribacterales; Huber and Stetter 2002
- Family: Deferribacteraceae; Huber and Stetter 2002

Genera
- See text

Synonyms
- Deferribacterota: "Deferribacteres" Garrity and Holt 2001; "Deferribacterota" Whitman et al. 2018; "Deferribacteraeota" Oren et al. 2015; Deferribacteres: Ferrobacteria Cavalier-Smith 2002; "Deferribacteria" Cavalier-Smith 2020; Deferribacterales: Geovibriales (sic) Cavalier-Smith 2002

Family of bacteria

The Deferribacteraceae are a family of gram-negative bacteria which make energy by anaerobic respiration.

== Description ==
Deferribacteraceae are rod-shaped, although the rods may be straight or bent. They are gram-negative. Deferribacteraceae perform anaerobic respiration using iron, manganese, or nitrate. They can also produce energy by fermentation. The type genus of the family is Deferribacter.

== Phylogeny ==
The currently accepted taxonomy is based on the List of Prokaryotic names with Standing in Nomenclature (LSPN) and National Center for Biotechnology Information (NCBI).

- Phylum Deferribacterota Garrity and Holt 2021
  - Class Deferribacteres Huber & Stetter 2002
    - Order Deferribacterales Huber & Stetter 2002
      - Genus ?"Ca. Rimicarispirillum" Aubé et al. 2022 {"Microvillispirillaceae" Aubé et al. 2022}
      - Family Calditerrivibrionaceae Spring et al. 2022
      - Family Deferribacteraceae Huber & Stetter 2002
      - Family Deferrivibrionaceae Zavarzina et al. 2023
      - Family Flexistipitaceae Spring et al. 2022
      - Family Geovibrionaceae Cavalier-Smith 2020
      - Family Mucispirillaceae Spring et al. 2022

16S rRNA based LTP_10_2024

- Deferribacterales
  - - Geovibrionaceae
      - - Limisalsivibrio Spring et al. 2022
        - Geovibrio Caccavo et al. 2000
      - - Denitrovibrio Myhr & Torsvik 2000
        - Seleniivibrio Rauschenbach et al. 2013
  - - - Mucispirillaceae
        Mucispirillum Robertson et al. 2005
    - - - Calditerrivibrionaceae
          Calditerrivibrio Iino et al. 2008
      - - - Deferrivibrionaceae
            - Deferrivibrio Zavarzina et al. 2023
            - Petrothermobacter Tamazawa et al. 2017
        - - Flexistipitaceae
            Flexistipes Fiala et al. 2000
          - Deferribacteraceae
            Deferribacter Greene et al. 1997

120 marker proteins based GTDB 10-RS226

- Deferribacterales
  - - Mucispirillaceae
      Mucispirillum
  - - - Geovibrionaceae
        - - Limisalsivibrio
          - Geovibrio
        - - Denitrovibrio
          - Seleniivibrio
    - - - - Flexistipitaceae
            Flexistipes
        - - Calditerrivibrionaceae
            Calditerrivibrio
          - Deferrivibrionaceae
            Deferrivibrio
      - - Deferribacteraceae
          Deferribacter

== History ==
The family was first described in 2001 in order to hold the genera Deferribacter, Flexistipes, and Geovibrio.

== See also ==
- List of bacterial orders
- List of bacteria genera
