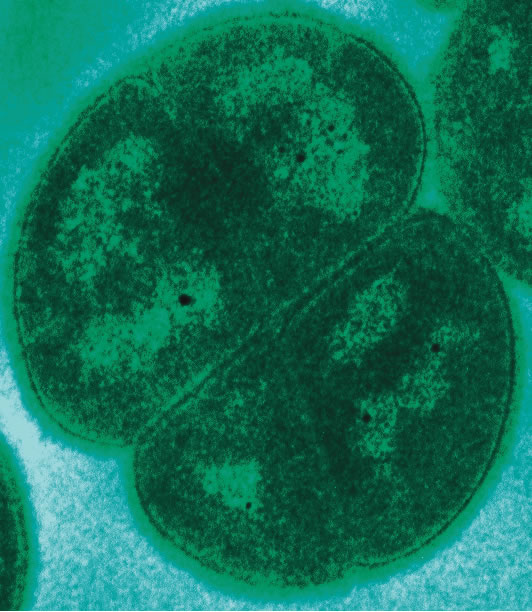

Scientific classification
- Domain: Bacteria
- Kingdom: Thermotogati
- Phylum: Deinococcota; Weisburg et al. 2021
- Class: Deinococci; Garrity and Holt 2002

Orders & families
- Deinococcales; Thermales

Synonyms
- Deinococcota; "Deinobacteria" Cavalier-Smith 2006; "Deinococcobacteria" Margulis & Schwartz 1998; "Deinococcaeota" Oren et al. 2015; "Deinococcota" Whitman et al. 2018; "Deinococcus–Thermus" Weisburg et al. 1989; "Hadobacteria" Cavalier-Smith 2006; "Xenobacteria"; Deinococci; "Deinococcia" Oren, Parte & Garrity 2016 ex Cavalier-Smith 2020; "Thermi" Rinke et al. 2013; "Thermia" Cavalier-Smith 2020

= Deinococcota =

Phylum of Gram-negative bacteria

Deinococcota (synonym, "Deinococcus-Thermus") is a phylum of bacteria with a single class, Deinococci (from Ancient Greek δεινός (deinós), meaning "terrible", and κόκκος (kókkos), meaning "berry"), that are highly resistant to environmental hazards, also known as extremophiles.

These bacteria have thick cell walls that give them gram-positive stains, but they include a second membrane and so are closer in structure to those of gram-negative bacteria.

== Taxonomy ==
The phylum Deinococcota consists of a single class (Deinococci) and two orders:

Deinococcales
Includes two families (Deinococcaceae and Trueperaceae), with three genera, Deinococcus, Deinobacterium and Truepera. Truepera radiovictrix is the earliest diverging member of the order. Within the order, Deinococcus forms a distinct monophyletic cluster with respect to Deinobacterium and Truepera species.
The genus includes several species that are resistant to radiation; they have become famous for their ability to eat nuclear waste and other toxic materials, survive in the vacuum of space and survive extremes of heat and cold.
Thermales
Includes several genera resistant to heat (Marinithermus, Meiothermus, Oceanithermus, Thermus, Vulcanithermus, Rhabdothermus) placed within a single family, Thermaceae. Phylogenetic analyses demonstrate that within the Thermales, Meiothermus and Thermus species form a monophyletic cluster, with respect to Marinithermus, Oceanithermus, Vulcanithermus and Rhabdothermus that branch as outgroups within the order. This suggests that Meiothermus and Thermus species are more closely related to one another relative to other genera within the order.
Thermus aquaticus was important in the development of the polymerase chain reaction where repeated cycles of heating DNA to near boiling make it advantageous to use a thermo-stable DNA polymerase enzyme, the Taq polymerase.

Though these two groups evolved from a common ancestor, the two mechanisms of resistance appear to be largely independent.

== Molecular signatures ==
Molecular signatures in the form of conserved signature indels (CSIs) and proteins (CSPs) have been found that are uniquely shared by all members belonging to the Deinococcota phylum. These CSIs and CSPs are distinguishing characteristics that delineate the unique phylum from all other bacterial organisms, and their exclusive distribution is parallel with the observed differences in physiology. CSIs and CSPs have also been found that support order and family-level taxonomic rankings within the phylum. Some of the CSIs found to support order level distinctions are thought to play a role in the respective extremophilic characteristics. The CSIs found in DNA-directed RNA polymerase subunit beta and DNA topoisomerase I in Thermales species may be involved in thermophilicity, while those found in Excinuclease ABC, DNA gyrase, and DNA repair protein RadA in Deinococcales species may be associated with radioresistance.

Additionally, some genera within this group, including Deinococcus, Thermus, and Meiothermus, also have molecular signatures that demarcate them as individual genera, inclusive of their respective species, providing a means to distinguish them from the rest of the group and all other bacteria. Two CSPs that were found uniquely for all members belonging to the Deinococcus genus are well characterized and are thought to play a role in their characteristic radioresistant phenotype. These CSPs include the DNA damage repair protein PprA and the single-stranded DNA-binding protein DdrB.

CSIs have also been found specific for Truepera radiovictrix.

== Phylogeny ==
The currently accepted taxonomy is based on the List of Prokaryotic names with Standing in Nomenclature (LPSN) and National Center for Biotechnology Information (NCBI)

16S rRNA based LTP_07_2026

- "Deinococcia"
  - - Thermales
      - Thermaceae
        - - Allomeiothermus Jiao et al. 2023
          - - Calidithermus Raposo et al. 2019
            - Meiothermus Nobre et al. 1996
        - - Oceanithermus Miroshnichenko et al. 2003
          - - Marinithermus Sako et al. 2003
            - - - Rhabdothermus Steinsbu et al. 2011
                - Vulcanithermus Miroshnichenko et al. 2003
              - Thermus Brock & Freeze 1969
  - - Trueperales
      - Trueperaceae
        Truepera Albuquerque, da Costa & Rainey 2005
    - Deinococcales
      - Deinococcaceae
        - - Deinococcus peraridilitoris
          - - Deinobacterium Ekman et al. 2011
            - Deinococcus~
        - Deinococcus Brooks & Murray 1981

120 marker proteins based GTDB release 11-RS232

- "Deinococcia"
  - Deinococcales
    - - "Marinithermaceae"
        - Marinithermus
        - Oceanithermus
      - Thermaceae
        - - Allomeiothermus
          - - Calidithermus
            - Meiothermus
        - Thermus
    - - Trueperaceae
        Truepera
      - Deinococcaceae
        - - Deinobacterium
          - Deinococcus_C
        - Deinococcus

== Sequenced genomes ==
By 2009 there were 10 sequenced genomes of strains in this phylum.

- Deinococcus radiodurans R1
- Thermus thermophilus HB27
- Thermus thermophilus HB8
- Deinococcus geothermalis DSM 11300
- Deinococcus deserti VCD115
- Meiothermus ruber DSM 1279
- Meiothermus silvanus DSM 9946
- Truepera radiovictrix DSM 17093
- Oceanithermus profundus DSM 14977

The two Meiothermus species were sequenced under the auspices of the Genomic Encyclopedia of Bacteria and Archaea project (GEBA), which aims at sequencing organisms based on phylogenetic novelty and not on pathogenicity or notoriety.

As of August 2026, the number of sequenced genomes is 1,341, of which 138 are labelled "reference genome" by NCBI and 921 are metagenome-assembled genomes.

== See also ==
- List of bacteria genera
- List of bacterial orders
