= Thermaceae =

Scientific classification
- Domain: Bacteria
- Kingdom: Thermotogati
- Phylum: Deinococcota
- Class: Deinococci
- Order: Thermales; Rainey and da Costa 2002
- Family: Thermaceae da Costa and Rainey 2002

Genera
- Allomeiothermus; Calidithermus; Marinithermus; Meiothermus; Oceanithermus; Rhabdothermus; Thermus; Vulcanithermus

Synonyms
- Marinithermaceae Chuvochina et al. 2024

Family of bacteria

Thermaceae is a family of bacteria belonging to the phylum Deinococcota. It is the only family in the order Thermales. They are particularly resistant to heat, and live in the benthic zone of the Gulf of Mexico.

Members of the order Thermales can be distinguished from all other bacteria through molecular signatures consisting of conserved signature indels (CSIs) and conserved signature proteins (CSPs) that are exclusively present in members of this order. Specifically, six CSIs were identified in the following proteins: DNA topoisomerase I, ABC transporter permease, citrate synthase, phosphoribosylformylglycinamidine synthase, pyruvate dehydrogenase and alpha-glucan phosphorylase. 51 CSPs were also found to be exclusively shared by members of this order.

In addition, a 76-aminoacid CSI is present in the protein SecA preprotein translocase which is specific to all members of the order Thermales as well as Hydrogenibacillus schlegelii (also an thermophilic species). Based on studies on other CSIs and CSPs, it is likely that some of these CSIs and CSPs could have implications in the thermophilic phenotype of Thermales species.

== Phylogeny ==
The currently accepted taxonomy is based on the List of Prokaryotic names with Standing in Nomenclature (LPSN) and National Center for Biotechnology Information (NCBI).

16S rRNA based LTP_07_2026

- Thermaceae Thermales
  - - Allomeiothermus Jiao et al. 2023
    - - Calidithermus Raposo et al. 2019
      - Meiothermus Nobre et al. 1996
  - - Oceanithermus Miroshnichenko et al. 2003
    - - Marinithermus Sako et al. 2003
      - - - Rhabdothermus Steinsbu et al. 2011
          - Vulcanithermus Miroshnichenko et al. 2003
        - Thermus Brock and Freeze 1969 (Approved Lists 1980)

120 marker proteins based GTDB 11-RS232

- Thermales
  - Marinithermaceae
    - Marinithermus
    - Oceanithermus
  - Thermaceae
    - - Allomeiothermus
      - - Calidithermus
        - Meiothermus
    - Thermus

== See also ==
- List of bacteria genera
- List of bacterial orders
