= Daniela Billi =

Italian astrobiologist

Daniela Billi is an Italian astrobiologist working at the University of Rome Tor Vergata. She is known for her work on desert cyanobacteria of the genus Chroococcidiopsis.

== Work ==
Daniela Billi showed that desert cyanobacteria from the genus Chroococcidiopsis are highly resistant to extreme environmental conditions including desiccation, ionizing radiation, UV radiation, and various factors encountered in extraterrestrial environments (see for example).

Due to insights given by her and her colleagues' work, Chroococcidiopsis is considered as a model genus when studying the current or past habitability of Mars (see for example).

She and her colleagues also suggested that Chrooccoccidiopsis could be used in crewed missions on Mars for the production of resources for astronauts. To move in this direction, she developed genetic engineering tools for those cyanobacteria.

She is maintaining the Culture Collection of Organisms from Extreme Environments (CCMEE) established by Imre Friedmann.

== Involvement in space missions ==
Billi was involved in the EXPOSE-R2 mission, an astrobiogy experiment launched on 24 July 2014, which exposed different species of microorganisms to the environment outside the International Space Station. She was responsible for experiments involving Chroococcidiopsis as part of the two major EPOSE-R2 subprojects: Biology and Mars Experiment (BIOMEX), and Biofilm Organisms Surfing Space (BOSS).
