= EXPOSE =

External facility on the ISS dedicated to astrobiology experiments

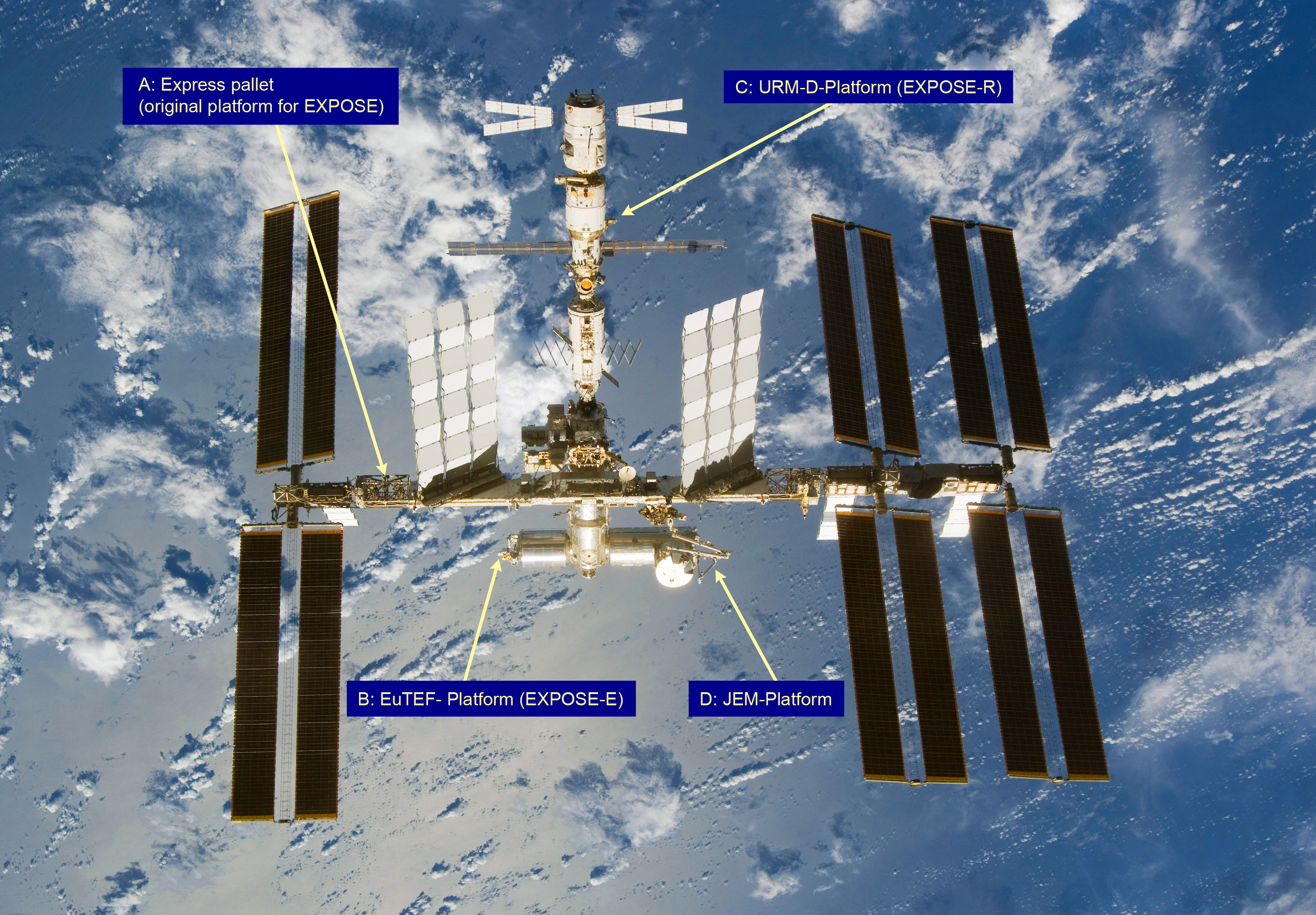
Location of the astrobiology EXPOSE-E and EXPOSE-R facilities on the International Space Station

EXPOSE is a multi-user facility mounted outside the International Space Station (ISS) dedicated to astrobiology. EXPOSE was developed by the European Space Agency (ESA) for long-term spaceflights and was designed to allow exposure of chemical and biological samples to outer space while recording data during exposure.

The results will contribute to our understanding of photobiological processes in simulated radiation climates of planets (e.g. early Earth, early and present Mars, and the role of the ozone layer in protecting the biosphere from harmful UV-B radiation), as well as studies of the probabilities and limitations for life to be distributed beyond its planet of origin. EXPOSE data support long-term in situ studies of microbes in artificial meteorites, as well as of microbial communities from special ecological niches. Some EXPOSE experiments investigated to what extent particular terrestrial organisms are able to cope with extraterrestrial environmental conditions. Others tested how organic molecules react when subjected for a prolonged period of time to unfiltered solar light.

== Objectives ==
EXPOSE has several objectives, specific to each experiments, but all linked to the astrobiology domain. Their collective objective is to better understand the nature and evolution of organic matter present in extraterrestrial environments and their potential implications in astrobiology. These experiments mostly study molecules of cometary interest in order to understand the results of the Rosetta mission, the chemistry of Titan (Cassini–Huygens mission), or the organic chemistry of the Martian environment (Mars Science Laboratory and ExoMars project).

=== Relevance ===
With the experiments onboard of the EXPOSE facilities, various aspects of astrobiology were investigated that could not be sufficiently approached by use of laboratory facilities on ground. The chemical set of experiments is designed to reach a better understanding of the role of interstellar, cometary and planetary chemistry in the origin of life. Comets and meteorites are interpreted as exogenous sources of prebiotic molecules on the early Earth. All data achieved from the astrobiological experiments on both EXPOSE missions will add to the understanding of the origin and evolution of life on Earth and on the possibility of its distribution in space or origin elsewhere.

Data obtained from the studies on complex organics of cometary interest will support the interpretation of in-situ data obtained from the Rosetta mission after landing on Comet 67P/Churyumov–Gerasimenko in 2014, and samples analyzed by the Curiosity and ExoMars rovers on Mars. Finally the chemical experiments will contribute to the understanding of the chemical processes on Saturn's moon Titan and possible analogies to the prebiotic chemistry on the early Earth.

The biology experiments used the full extraterrestrial spectrum of solar UV radiation and suitable cut-off filters to study both, the role of the ozone layer in protecting our biosphere and the likelihood of resistant terrestrial microorganisms (extremophiles) to survive in outer space. The latter studies will provide experimental data to the lithopanspermia hypothesis, and they will provide basic data to planetary protection issues. To get better insight into the habitability of Mars, one set of samples was exposed to simulated Martian conditions (UV-radiation climate, pressure, atmosphere), with and without a protective cover of simulated Martian soil. The biological test samples selected are hardy representatives of various branches of life.

== General mission description ==
There were three EXPOSE experiments completed between 2008 and 2015: EXPOSE-E, EXPOSE-R and EXPOSE-R2.

The EXPOSE-E was launched on 7 February 2008 on board the Space Shuttle Atlantis and was mounted on the ISS European module Columbus to the European Technology Exposure Facility (EuTEF). EXPOSE-R was launched to the ISS on 26 November 2008 from Baikonur Cosmodrome in Kazakhstan on board of a Progress capsule and was mounted on the ISS Russian module Zevzda. EXPOSE-E provided accommodation in three exposure trays for a variety of astrobiological test samples that were exposed to selected space conditions: either to space vacuum, solar electromagnetic radiation at >110 nm and cosmic radiation (trays 1 and 3) or to simulated Martian surface conditions (tray 2). The different experiments consisted in exposing solid molecules, gas mixtures or biological samples to the solar ultraviolet (UV) radiation, cosmic rays, vacuum and temperature fluctuations of outer space as the ISS repeatedly passed between areas of direct sunlight and the cold darkness of Earth's shadow.

At the end of the exposition period, EXPOSE-E was brought back to the ground in September 2009 as part of the Space Shuttle Discovery mission STS-128. EXPOSE-R was brought back in 2011 by a Soyuz spacecraft. From the landing site in Kazakhstan, the trays were returned via Moscow and distributed to scientists for further analysis in their laboratories. EXPOSE-R2 was launched on 24 July 2014, exposure was finished in April 2015, and was returned to Earth in early 2016 where it is still undergoing analyses.

== EXPOSE-E ==
The EXPOSE-E experiments are:

- PROCESS, study photochemical organic compounds in Earth orbit. Relevant to comets, meteorites, Mars and Titan.
- ADAPT, study molecular adaptation strategies of microorganisms in analogues to meteoritic matter to different space and planetary UV climate conditions.
- PROTECT, study of spores' resistance to space conditions, and their ability to recover from the damages done by such an exposition. For planetary protection purposes.
- LiFE (Lichens and Fungi Experiment), study of radiations effect on lichens, fungi and symbiotes in space conditions.
- SEEDS, test plant seed as a terrestrial model for a panspermia vehicle and as a source of universal UV screens and study of their ability to resist radiations.
- Dosis, Dobis & R3D, passive dosimeters for ionizing radiation measurement and the R3D (Radiation Risk Radiometer-Dosimeter E) active radiation measuring instrument.

=== EXPOSE-E results ===
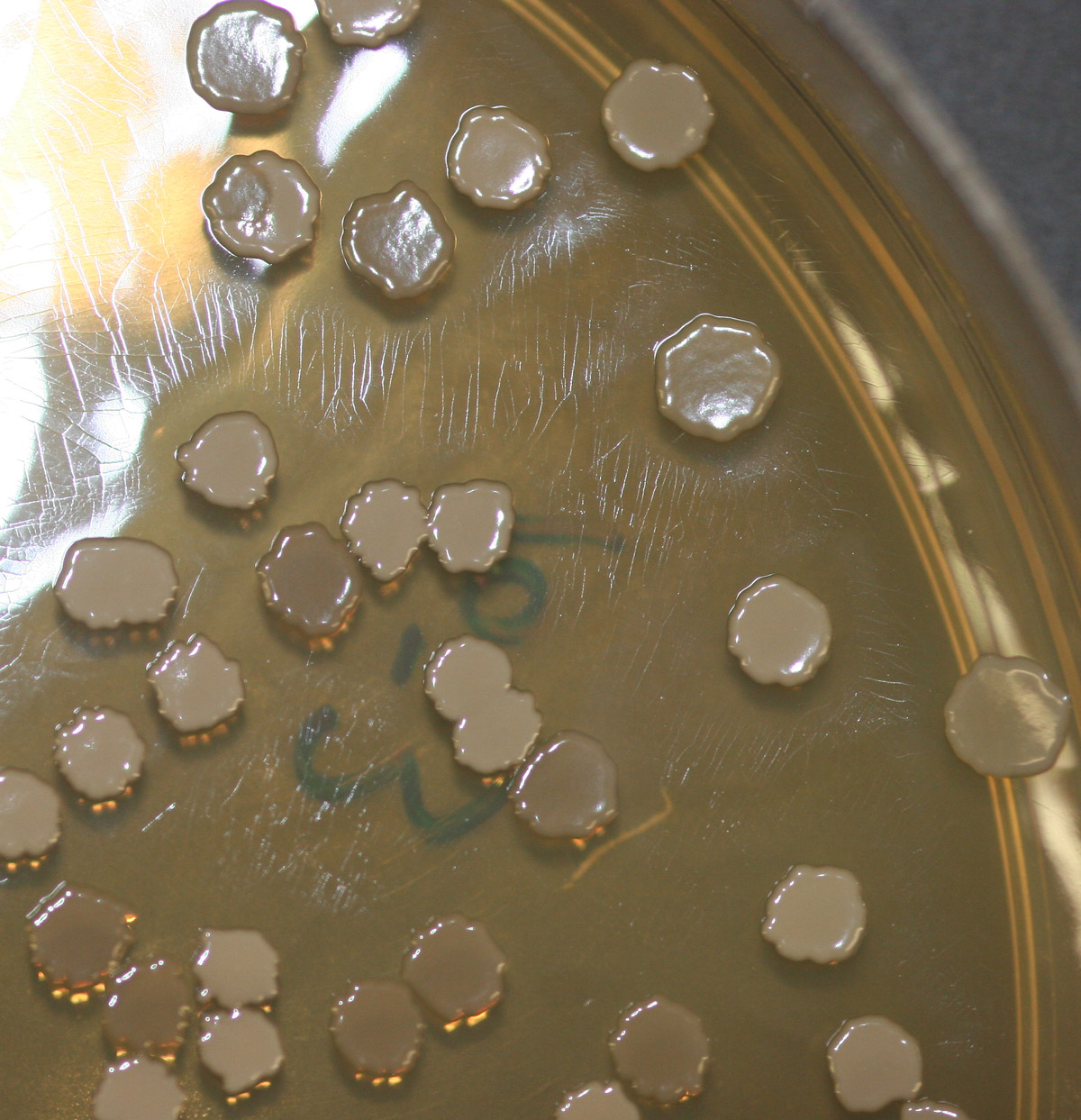
Colonies of Bacillus subtilis grown on a culture dish in a molecular biology laboratory.

==== PROCESS ====
The search for organic molecules at the surface of Mars is a top priority of Mars exploration space missions. Therefore, a key step in interpretation of future data collected by these missions is to understand the preservation of organic matter in the Martian environment. A 1.5-year exposure to Mars-like surface UV radiation conditions in space resulted in complete degradation of the organic compounds (glycine, serine, phthalic acid, phthalic acid in the presence of a mineral phase, and mellitic acid). Their half-lives were between 50 and 150 h for Martian surface conditions.

To understand the chemical behavior of organic molecules in the space environment, amino acids and a dipeptide in pure form and embedded in meteorite powder were exposed to space conditions for 18 months; the samples were returned to Earth and analyzed in the laboratory for reactions caused by solar UV and cosmic radiation. The results show that resistance to irradiation is a function of the chemical nature of the exposed molecules and the wavelengths of the UV light. The most altered compounds were the dipeptide, aspartic acid, and aminobutyric acid. The most resistant were alanine, valine, glycine, and aminoisobutyric acid. The results also demonstrate the protective effect of meteorite powder, which reemphasizes the importance of exogenic contribution to the inventory of prebiotic organics on early Earth.

==== ADAPT ====
Bacterial endospores of the highly UV-resistant Bacillus subtilis strain MW01 were exposed to low Earth orbit and simulated Martian surface conditions for 559 days. It was clearly shown that solar extraterrestrial UV radiation (λ ≥110 nm) as well as the Martian UV spectrum (λ ≥200 nm) was the most deleterious factor applied; in some samples only a few spore survivors were recovered from B. subtilis MW01 spores exposed in monolayers. However, if shielded from solar irradiation, about 8% of MW01 spores survived, and 100% survived in simulated Martian conditions, compared to the laboratory controls.

Halococcus dombrowskii (ADAPT II) and a naturally UV-adapted phototrophic community (ADAPT III) were two other targets of the experiment. For ADAPT-II, no counting from the space station has been published, but preliminary ground experiments have established some tolerance levels. The results for ADAPT-III has been published. Many dyes (chlorophyll and carotenoids) used by the microbials are bleached by the UV rays, and quite a few species used in the dark control groups died. Chroococcidiopsis was the one to survive every group. Chlorella, Gloeocapsa, and Geminicoccus roseus were able to survive a lower UV level.

==== PROTECT ====
Ultraviolet radiation harm the DNA molecules of living organisms in different ways. In one common damage event, adjacent thymine bases bond with each other, instead of across the "ladder". This "thymine dimer" makes a bulge, and the distorted DNA molecule does not function properly.

Spore-forming bacteria are of particular concern in the context of planetary protection because their tough endospores may withstand certain sterilization procedures as well as the harsh environments of outer space or planetary surfaces. To test their hardiness on a hypothetical mission to Mars, spores of Bacillus subtilis 168 and Bacillus pumilus SAFR-032 were exposed for 1.5 years to selected parameters of space. It was clearly shown that solar extraterrestrial UV radiation (λ ≥110 nm) as well as the Martian UV spectrum (λ ≥200 nm) was the most deleterious factor applied; in some samples only a few survivors were recovered from spores exposed in monolayers. Spores in multilayers survived better by several orders of magnitude. All other environmental parameters encountered did little harm to the spores, which showed about 50% survival or more. The data demonstrate the high chance of survival of spores on a Mars mission, if protected against solar irradiation. These results will have implications for planetary protection considerations.

The mutagenic efficiency of space was also studied in spores of Bacillus subtilis 168. The data show the unique mutagenic power of space and Martian surface conditions as a consequence of DNA injuries induced by solar UV radiation and space vacuum or the low pressure of Mars. Spores exposed to space demonstrated a much broader and more severe stress response than spores exposed to simulated Martian conditions.

A comparative protein analysis (proteomics) of Bacillus pumilus SAFR-032 spores indicated that proteins conferring resistant traits (superoxide dismutase) were present in higher concentration in space-exposed spores when compared to controls. Also, the first-generation cells and spores derived from space-exposed samples exhibited elevated ultraviolet-C resistance when compared with their ground control counterparts. The data generated are important for calculating the probability and mechanisms of microbial survival in space conditions and assessing microbial contaminants as risks for forward contamination and in situ life detection.

==== LiFE ====
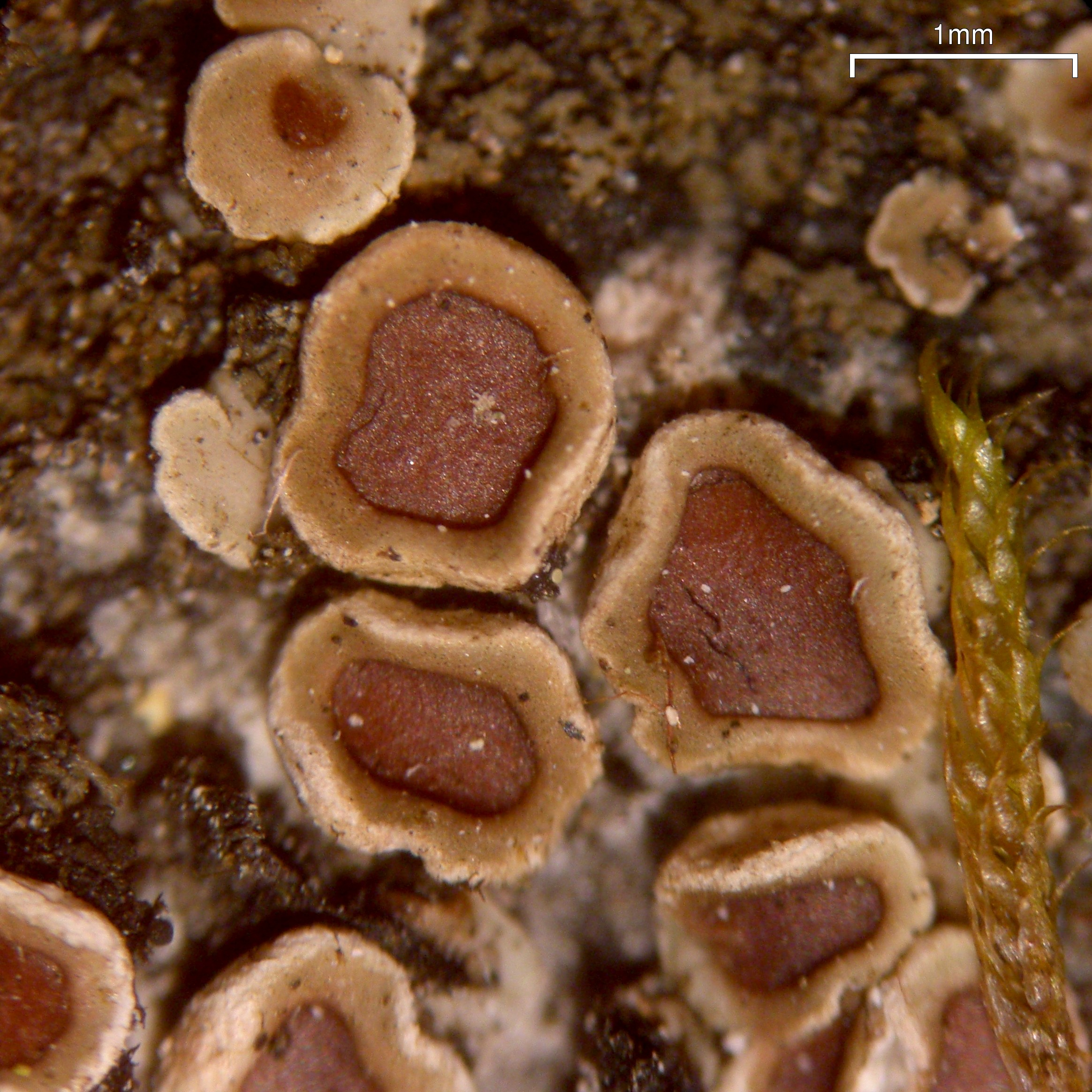
Acarospora

After 1.5 years in space, samples were retrieved, rehydrated and spread on different culture media. The only two organisms able to grow were isolated from a sample exposed to simulated Mars conditions beneath a 0.1% T Suprasil neutral density filter and from a sample exposed to space vacuum without solar radiation exposure, respectively. The two surviving organisms were identified as Stichococcus sp. (green algae) and Acarospora sp. (lichenized fungal genus). Among other fungal spores tested were Cryomyces antarcticus and Cryomyces minteri, and although 60% of the cells' DNA studied remained intact after the Mars-like conditions, less than 10% of the fungi were able to proliferate and form colonies after their return to Earth. According to the researchers, the studies provide experimental information on the possibility of eukaryotic life transfer from one planet to another by means of rocks and of survival in Mars environment.

Cryptoendolithic microbial communities and epilithic lichens have been considered as appropriate candidates for the scenario of lithopanspermia, which proposes a natural interplanetary exchange of organisms by means of rocks that have been impact ejected from their planet of origin. A 1.5 years exposure experiment in space was performed with a variety of rock-colonizing eukaryotic organisms. Selected organisms are known to cope with the environmental extremes of their natural habitats. It was found that some — but not all — of those most robust microbial communities from extremely hostile regions on Earth are also partially resistant to the even more hostile environment of outer space, including high vacuum, temperature fluctuation, the full spectrum of extraterrestrial solar electromagnetic radiation, and cosmic ionizing radiation. Although the reported experimental period of 1.5 years in space is not comparable with the time spans of thousands or millions of years believed to be required for lithopanspermia, the data provide first evidence of the differential hardiness of cryptoendolithic communities in space.

==== SEEDS ====
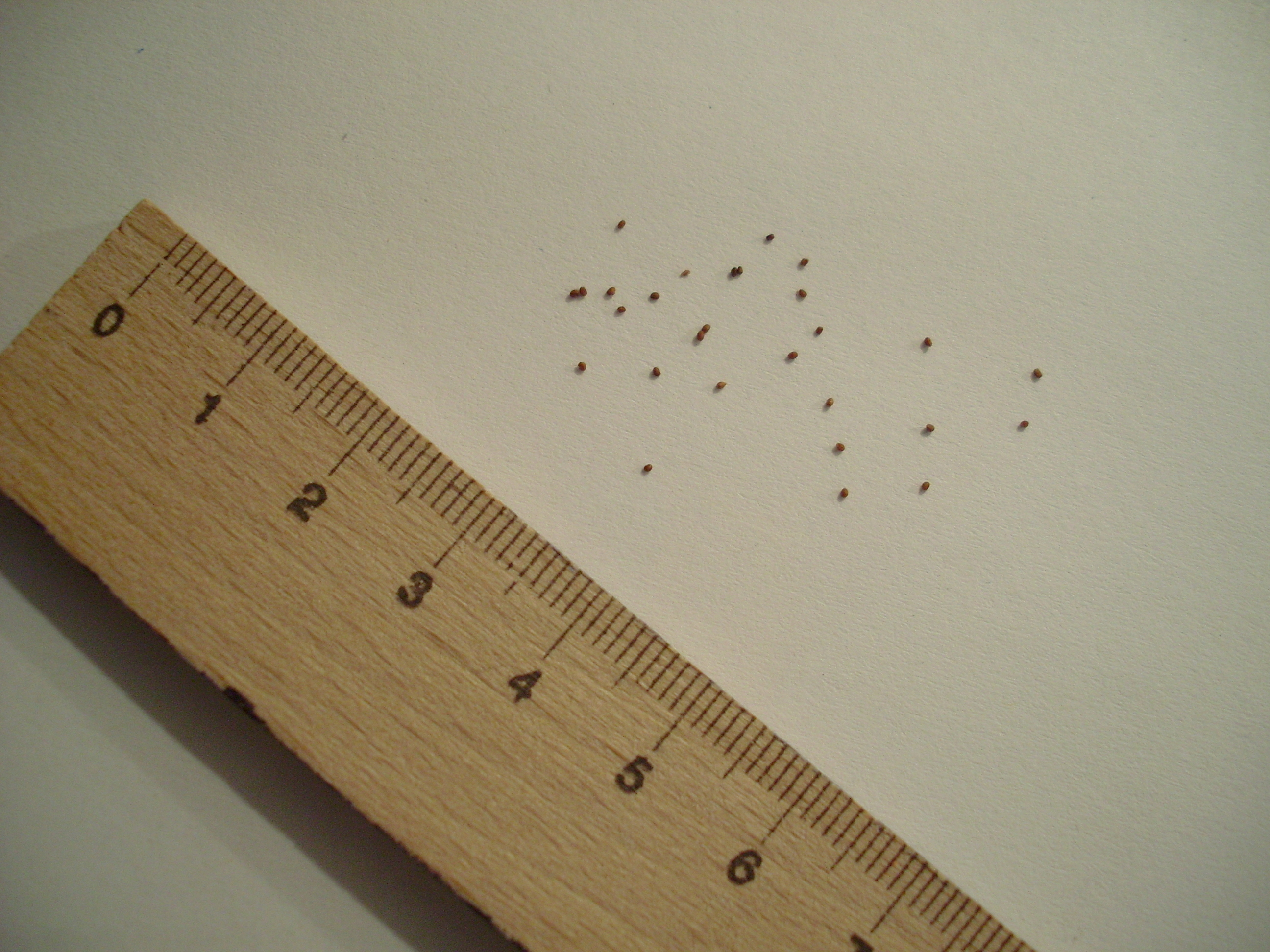
Tobacco seeds (Nicotiana tabacum)

The plausibility that life was imported to Earth from elsewhere was tested by subjecting plant seeds to 1.5 years of exposure to solar UV, solar and galactic cosmic radiation, temperature fluctuations, and space vacuum outside the International Space Station. Of the 2100 exposed wild-type Arabidopsis thaliana and Nicotiana tabacum (tobacco) seeds, 23% produced viable plants after being returned to Earth. Germination was delayed in seeds shielded from solar light, yet full survival was attained, which indicates that longer space travel would be possible for seeds embedded in an opaque matrix. The team conclude that a naked, seed-like entity could have survived exposure to solar UV radiation during a hypothetical transfer from Mars to Earth, and even if seeds do not survive, components (e.g., their DNA) might survive transfer over cosmic distances.

==== Dosis, Dobis ====
As a consequence of the high shielding by the nearby ISS, the biological samples were predominantly exposed to galactic cosmic heavy ions, while electrons and a significant fraction of protons of the radiation belts and solar wind did not reach the samples.

==== R3D (Radiation Risk Radiometer-Dosimeter E) ====
Types of ionizing radiation - gamma rays are represented by wavy lines, charged particles and neutrons by straight lines. The small circles show where ionization processes occur.

R3D measured ionizing and non-ionizing radiation as well as cosmic radiation reaching the biological samples located on the EXPOSE-E. Due to errors in data transmission or temporary termination of EXPOSE power, not all data could be acquired. Radiation was not constant during the mission. At regular intervals of about 2 months, low or almost no radiation was encountered. The radiation dose during the mission was 1823.98 MJ m−2 for PAR, 269.03 MJ m−2 for UVA, 45.73 MJ m−2 for UVB, or 18.28 MJ m−2 for UVC. Registered sunshine duration during the mission was about 152 days (about 27% of mission time). The surface of EXPOSE was most likely turned away from the Sun for considerably longer time.

The highest daily averaged absorbed dose rate of 426 μGy per day came from the 'South Atlantic Anomaly' (SAA) region of the inner radiation belt; galactic cosmic rays (GCR) delivered a daily absorbed dose rate of 91.1 μGy per day, and the outer radiation belt (ORB) source delivered 8.6 μGy per day.

== EXPOSE-R ==
Expose-R (R stands for its mounting on the Russian module Zvezda) was mounted by Russian cosmonaut's extravehicular activity on 11 March 2009 and the exposure to outer space conditions continued for 682 days until 21 January 2011, when it was brought back to Earth by the last Discovery Shuttle flight STS-133 on 9 March 2011. EXPOSE-R was equipped with three trays housing eight experiments and 3 radiation dosimeters. Each tray was loaded with a variety of biological organisms including plant seeds and spores of bacteria, fungi and ferns that were exposed to the harsh space environment for about one and a half years. The ROSE (Response of Organisms to Space Environment) group of experiments are under the coordination of the German Aerospace Center (DLR) and has been composed of scientists from different European countries, from United States and from Japan. In its 8 experiments of biological and chemical content, more than 1200 individual samples were exposed to solar ultraviolet (UV) radiations, vacuum, cosmic rays or extreme temperature variations. In their different experiments, the involved scientists are studying the question of life's origin on Earth and the results of their experiments are contributing to different aspects of the evolution and distribution of life in the Universe.

The EXPOSE-R experiments are:

- AMINO, study of solar ultraviolet (UV) effects on amino acids and other organic compounds placed in terrestrial orbit.
- ORGANICS, study of the evolution of organic matter placed in outer space.
- ENDO (ROSE-1), study the effects of radiation on endolithic microorganisms (growing within cracks and pore spaces in rocks).
- OSMO (ROSE-2), study of the exposition of osmophilic microorganisms to space environment.
- SPORES (ROSE-3), study of spores placed inside artificial meteorites.
- PHOTO (ROSE-4), study of solar radiation effects on the genetic material of spores.
- SUBTIL (ROSE-5), study of mutagen effect of space environment on bacterial spores (Bacillus subtilis).
- PUR (ROSE-8), study of space environment effect on T7 phage, its DNA and of polycristalline uracil.
- IMBP (Institute of Biomedical Problems), this included bacterial spores, fungal spores, plant seeds, and eggs of lower crustacean and cryptobiotic larvae.

=== EXPOSE-R results ===
Pictures acquired during the spacewalk #27 on the final day of exposure indicated that many of the 75 small windows had turned brown. The brown film was clearly a deposit which had precipitated inside the windows during the spaceflight. The appearance of the brown film turned out to depend on two prerequisites: solar irradiation and vacuum. As the brown film should have impacted the quantity and quality of solar light that reached the test samples, affecting the core of the scientific goals, an investigation was started to identify the properties and the root cause of the colour change. The brown film contained hydrocarbons, so an inventory was made of materials contained inside Expose-R that could possibly have delivered the contaminating volatiles.

The true chemical identity was not established, but their origin may have been substances added to adhesives, plastics and printed circuit boards.

Since not all the windows developed a contaminating brown film, some experiments were effectively exposed:

- AMINO
  - Exposure of methane: It studies the whole chain of methane (CH_{4}) photo-degradation, as initiated by vacuum and solar ultraviolet irradiation in the Atmosphere of Titan. Methane consumption leads to the formation of saturated hydrocarbons, with no apparent influence of CO_{2}.
  - Exposure of aminoacids: amino acids and a dipeptide in pure form and embedded in meteorite powder were exposed to outer space. The results confirm that resistance to irradiation is a function of the chemical nature of the exposed molecules and of the wavelengths of the UV light. They also confirm the protective effect of a coating of meteorite powder. The most altered compounds were the dipeptides and aspartic acid while the most robust were compounds with a hydrocarbon chain. The analyses document several products of reactions taking place after UV exposure in space.
  - RNA stability: The exposition to the solar radiation has a strong degradation effect on the size distribution of RNA. Moreover, the solar radiation degrades RNA nucleobases.
- ORGANICS: Fourteen thin films of the ORGANIC experiment (eleven polycyclic aromatic hydrocarbons (PAHs) and three fullerenes) received an irradiation dose of the order of 14000 MJ m^{−2} over 2900 h of unshadowed solar illumination during space exposure. Compact PAHs are more stable than non-compact PAHs, which are themselves more stable than PAHs containing heteroatoms, the last category being the most prone to degradation in the space environment. The insignificant spectral changes (below 10%) measured indicate a high stability under the range of space exposure conditions investigated on EXPOSE-R.
- ENDO: These results provide a demonstration that endolithic habitats can provide a habitat from the worst-case UV radiation environments on young planets and an empirical refutation of the idea that early intense UV radiation fluxes would have prevented phototrophs without the ability to form microbial mats or produce UV protective pigments from colonizing the surface of early landmasses.
- OSMO: Previously, scientists showed using ESA's BIOPAN facility flown in Earth orbit that when exposed to the space environment for 2 weeks the survival rate of Synechococcus (Nägeli) and Halorubrum chaoviator their survival were higher than all other test organisms except Bacillus spores. EXPOSE-R provided an opportunity to refine and expand their exposure. Samples kept in the dark, but exposed to space vacuum had a 90 ± 5% survival rate compared to the ground controls. Samples exposed to full UV-radiation of outer space for over a year were bleached and no survival was detected.
- SPORES: The experiment SPORES (Spores in artificial meteorites) exposed chemical and biological samples to address the question whether the meteorite material offers enough protection against the harsh environment of space for spores (Bacillus subtilis 168) to survive a long-term journey in space by experimentally mimicking the hypothetical scenario of lithopanspermia. The results demonstrate the high inactivating potential of extraterrestrial UV radiation as one of the most harmful factors of space, especially UV at λ>110 nm. The UV-induced inactivation is mainly caused by photodamaging of the DNA, as documented by the identification of the spore photoproduct 5,6-dihydro-5(α-thyminyl)thymine. The data disclose the limits of lithopanspermia for spores located in the upper layers of impact-ejected rocks due to access of harmful extraterrestrial solar UV radiation, and confirms its protection when sheltered by meteorite material. As well, spores of the fungus Trichoderma longibrachiatum were exposed, and about 30% of the spores in vacuum survived the space travel, if shielded against insolation. However, in most cases no significant decrease was observed for spores exposed in addition to the full spectrum of solar UV irradiation. As the spores were exposed in clusters, the outer layers of spores may have shielded the inner part. The results give some information about the likelihood of lithopanspermia. In addition to the parameters of outer space, time in space seems to be one of the limiting parameters.
- PUR: This experiment measured the biologically effective ultraviolet dose in the outer space radiation conditions on bacteriophage T7 and uracil. The selected UV wavelengths not only cause photolesions but also cause the reversion of some photolesions, in a wavelength-dependent efficiency.
- IMBP: After more than 1 year of outer space exposure, the spores of microorganisms and fungi, as well as two species of plant seeds (Arabidopsis thaliana and Tomato) were analysed for viability and the set of biological properties. The experiment provided evidence that not only bacterial and fungal spores but also seeds (dormant forms of plants) have the capability to survive a long-term exposure to outer space.

== EXPOSE-R2 ==
A third mission, called EXPOSE-R2, was launched on 24 July 2014 aboard the Russian Progress M-24M, carrying 46 species of bacteria, fungi and arthropods, in 758 different samples that were exposed to different conditions, under different filters, and for various time periods. It was attached on 18 August 2014 to the exterior of the ISS on the Russian module Zvezda, and exposure was finished on 3 February 2016, and were stored inside the ISS until their return to Earth on 18 June 2016. Two main experiments (BIOMEX and BOSS) tested a desert strain of cyanobacterium called Chroococcidiopsis and Deinococcus geothermalis, as well as bacteria, yeast (including Kombucha culture,) archaea, algae, fungi, lichens and mosses, while the Biochip experiment will test affinity receptors to biomolecules. The organisms and organic compounds were exposed to partial and full space conditions for 12 to 18 months, and were returned to Earth in early 2016 for analyses.

- The Biology and Mars Experiment (BIOMEX). Its objective is to measure to what extent biomolecules, such as biological pigments, cellular components, and biofilms are resistant to and able to maintain their stability under space and Mars-like conditions. The results of BIOMEX will be relevant for space-proven biosignature definition and for building a biosignature data base.

The secondary scientific objective of BIOMEX is to analyze to what extent selected terrestrial extremophiles are able to survive in space and to determine which interactions between biological samples and selected minerals (including terrestrial, Moon and Mars analogs) can be observed under space and Mars-like conditions. BIOMEX contains numerous chambers that are filled with biomolecules and organisms that include bacteria, archaea, algae, fungi, lichens and mosses. The samples will spend up to one and a half years outside the space station, and the organisms will be monitored with temperature sensors and dosimeters, which monitor radiation exposure. Scientists will continuously monitor the survival of the organisms and the stability of important cellular components like membrane lipids, pigments, proteins, and DNA. These investigations could thus enhance the chances of detecting organic traces of life on Mars. At the completion of the experiment, BIOMEX samples will be returned to Earth for study. BIOMEX is led by Jean-Pierre de Vera, from the German Aerospace Center (DLR), together with a team from 27 institutes in 12 countries.

- The second major experiment is called Biofilm Organisms Surfing Space (BOSS). The hypothesis to be tested is that "microorganisms grown as biofilms, hence embedded in self-produced extracellular polymeric substances, are more tolerant to space and Martian conditions compared to their planktonic counterparts." Two of the organisms being exposed are Deinococcus geothermalis and Chroococcidiopsis.
- The Biochip experiment will study the resistance of various biochip models to space constraints, especially cosmic radiation and extreme changes of temperature. Their detection principle is based on the recognition of a target molecule by affinity receptors (antibodies and aptamers) fixed on a solid surface. It is hoped it will eventually be deployed in planetary missions to help the search for biomolecules of past or present extraterrestrial life.
- The BIODIVERSITY experiment was provided by Russia.

=== EXPOSE-R2 results ===
- The light-protective carotenoid pigments (present in photosynthetic organisms such as plants, algae, cyanobacteria and in some bacteria and archaea) have been classified as high priority targets for biosignature models on Mars due to their stability and easy identification by Raman spectroscopy. In this experiment, the light-protective carotenoids in two organisms (cyanobacterium Nostoc sp. and the green alga cf. Sphaerocystis sp.) were still detectable at relatively high levels after being exposed for 15 months.
- Dried biofilms of three desert strains of Chroococcidiopsis showed overall higher viability and lower amounts of DNA damage when compared to multi-layer films of the planktonic counterpart, and were consistent with ground Mars simulation experiments. The strains tested were CCMEE 029 from the Negev Desert, where they live beneath the surface of rocks (endoliths) and strains CCMEE 057 and CCMEE 064 from the Sinai Desert where they are both endoliths and hypoliths (within rocks or on the ground sheltered beneath rocks).
- Other results are expected to be published in Frontiers in Microbiology under the research topic title: "Habitability Beyond Earth", and in an upcoming special collection of Astrobiology journal.
- In March 2019, scientists reported that life-forms from Earth survived 18 months living in outer space outside the International Space Station (ISS), as part of the BIOMEX studies related to the EXPOSE-R2 mission, suggesting that life could survive, theoretically, on the planet Mars.

== See also ==
- Astrobiology – Science concerned with life in the universe
- Bion (satellite) – Soviet and Russian spacecraft aimed at biological experiments in space
- BIOPAN – European Space Agency research program
- Biosatellite program – Series of 3 NASA satellites to assess the effects of spaceflight on living organisms
- Life on Mars – Assessments of possible life on Mars
- List of microorganisms tested in outer space
- O/OREOS – NASA nanosatellite with 2 astrobiology experiments on board
- OREOcube – ESA experiment investigating effects of cosmic radiation on organic compounds
- Panspermia – Hypothesis on the interstellar spreading of primordial life
- Tanpopo (mission) – 2015–18 ISS astrobiology experiment
