= Chroococcidiopsis =

Chroococcidiopsis Temporal range: Paleoproterozoic–Present 1900–0 Ma

Scientific classification
- Domain: Bacteria
- Kingdom: Bacillati
- Phylum: Cyanobacteriota
- Class: Cyanophyceae
- Order: Chroococcidiopsidales; Komárek et al. 2014
- Family: Chroococcidiopsidaceae; Komárek et al. 2014
- Genus: Chroococcidiopsis; Geitler, 1933

Type species
- Chroococcopsis gigantea Geitler, 1933

Genus of bacteria

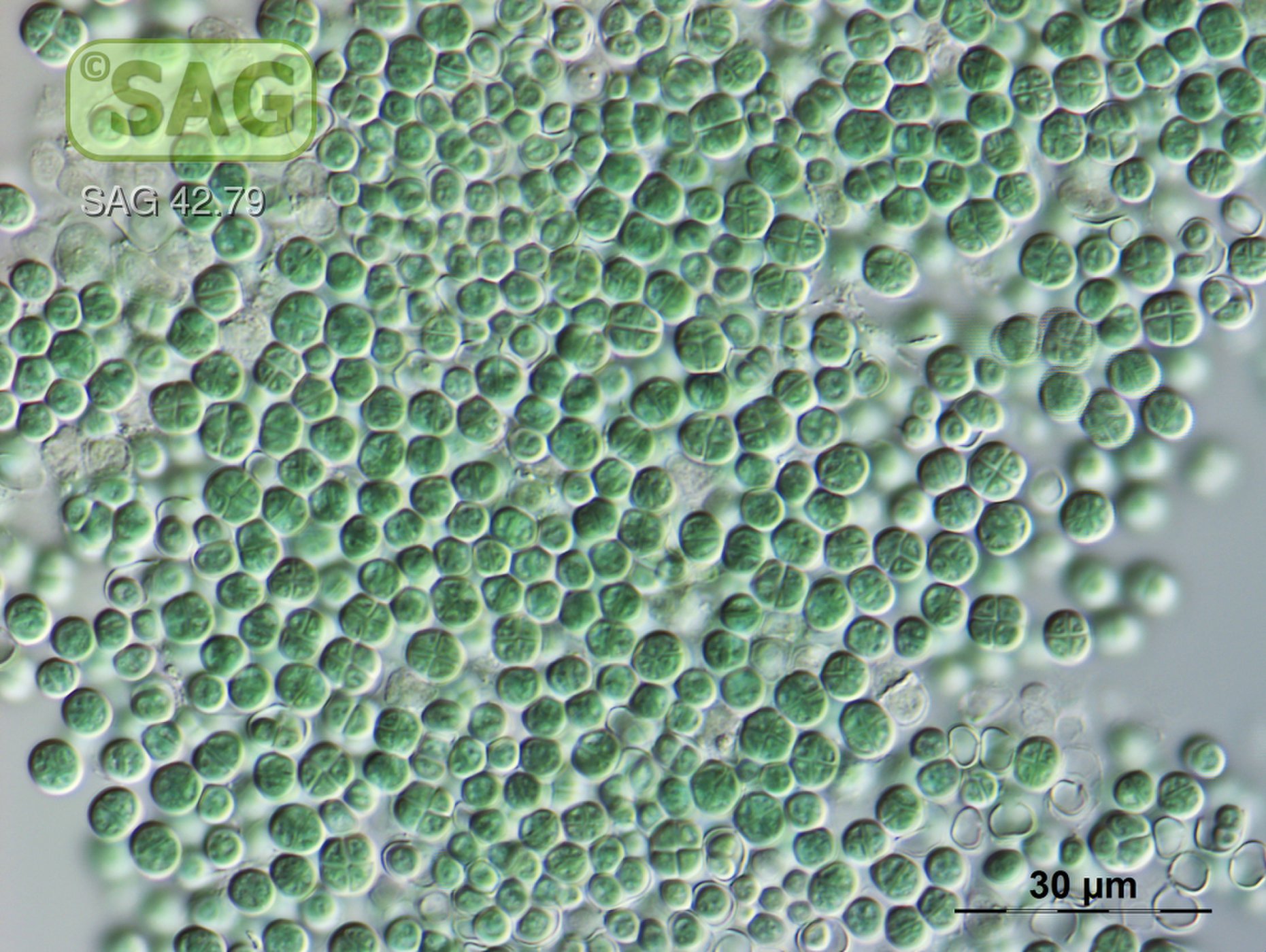
Chroococcidiopsis thermalis can photosynthesize in far-red light, and might be suitable for future Mars colonists.

Chroococcidiopsis is a photosynthetic, coccoidal bacterium, and the only genus in the order Chroococcidiopsidales and in the family Chroococcidiopsidaceae. A diversity of species and cultures exist within the genus, with a diversity of phenotypes. Some extremophile members of Chroococcidiopsis are known for their ability to survive harsh environmental conditions, including both high and low temperatures, ionizing radiation, and high salinity.

== Desiccation resistance ==
The ability of Chroococcidiopsis to resist desiccation in arid environments is due in part because it colonizes the underside of translucent rocks. The underside of these rocks provides enough condensed moisture for growth while the rock's translucent nature allows just enough light to reach the organism for photosynthesis to occur.

A 2023 study found Chroococcidiopsis is able to survive for long periods in a desiccated state on solar panels, under irradiated conditions. The samples were able to be genetically altered, proving potential future uses, but no specific task was coded into the samples used.

=== UV and desiccation resistance ===
Biofilms of Chroococcidiopsis were exposed to Mars-like UV-flux and desiccation for up to seven years. Biofilms that were either (1) dried or (2) both dried and UV irradiated were able to recover. When these biofilms were rewetted the nucleotide excision repair genes encoding UvrA, UvrB and UvrC were over-expressed. This suggests that nucleotide excision repair of accumulated DNA damages contributed to the recovery.

== Mars colonization ==
Due to its resistance to harsh environmental conditions, especially low temperature, low moisture, and radiation tolerance, Chroococcidiopsis has been thought of as an organism capable of living on Mars. Scientists have speculated about the possibility of introducing Chroococcidiopsis to the Martian environment to aid in the formation of an aerobic environment. In addition to oxygen production, Chroococcidiopsis could aid in the formation of soil on the Martian surface. On Earth, soil is formed by plant, microbial, and geophysical activity on a mineral substrate. The soil produced by chemical weathering of rocks and oxygen produced by photosynthesis could one day provide the conditions necessary for humans to grow food on Mars, possibly allowing for permanent human civilizations on the planet. On a shorter time scale, cyanobacteria such as Chroococcidiopsis could be used in closed systems to produce resources for human-occupied outposts on Mars without altering the planet's surface or atmosphere.

A space mission called EXPOSE-R2 was launched on 24 July 2014 aboard the Russian Progress M-24M, and was attached on 18 August 2014 outside the ISS on the Russian module Zvezda. The experiment included samples of Chroococcidiopsis that were exposed to simulated Martian atmosphere, UVC radiation and temperature extremes. In 2022, the findings of the experiments were published.

== Species ==
The Catalogue of Life includes 16 species of Chroococcidiopsis:

- Chroococcidiopsis bourrellyana Compère
- Chroococcidiopsis codiicola Beljakova
- Chroococcidiopsis cubana Komárek & Hindák
- Chroococcidiopsis doonensis R.B.Singh
- Chroococcidiopsis edaphica J.R.Johansen & Flechtner
- Chroococcidiopsis fissurarum (Ercegovic) Komárek & Anagnostidis
- Chroococcidiopsis indica Desikachary
- Chroococcidiopsis karnatakensis Kamat
- Chroococcidiopsis kashayi Friedmann
- Chroococcidiopsis lichenoides Villanueva, P.Hasler & Casamatta
- Chroococcidiopsis muralis (Lagerheim) Miscoe & J.R.Johansen
- Chroococcidiopsis spinosa Kamat
- Chroococcidiopsis supralittoralis Dor, N.Carl & I.Baldinger
- Chroococcidiopsis thermalis Geitler
- Chroococcidiopsis umbratilis Dor, N.Carl & I.Baldinger
- Chroococcidiopsis versatilis Dor, N.Carl & I.Baldinger

== See also ==
- Deinococcus radiodurans
