= Cryomyces minteri =

Scientific classification
- Kingdom: Fungi
- Division: Ascomycota
- Class: Dothideomycetes
- Family: incertae sedis
- Genus: Cryomyces
- Species: C. minteri

Binomial name
- Cryomyces minteri Selbmann, L.; Hoog, G.S. de; Mazzaglia, A.; Friedmann, E.I.; Onofri, S., 2005

Species of fungus

Cryomyces minteri is a fungus of uncertain placement in the class Dothideomycetes, division Ascomycota. The rock-inhabiting fungus that was discovered in the McMurdo Dry Valleys located in Antarctica, on fragments of rock colonized by a local cryptoendolithic community.

In 2008, Cryomyces minteri and Cryomyces antarcticus were simultaneously tested in low Earth orbit conditions on the EXPOSE-E facility on the EuTEF (European Technology Exposure Facility) platform outside the International Space Station for 18 months.

It was also tested in a space vacuum along with polychromatic UV radiation to simulate a Martian environment. The two fungi survived both of the simulations.
