= Su-Shu Huang =

- 黃授書
- Born: 黃授書; April 16, 1915; Changshu, Kiangshu, Republic of China
- Died: September 15, 1977 (aged 62); Beijing, China
- Citizenship: United States
- Education: Chekiang University (B.Sc.); Tsing Hua University(M.Sc.); University of Chicago (Ph.D.)
- Known for: Explorations of the circumstellar habitable zone and prerequisites of extraterrestrial life
- Awards: Guggenheim Foundation Fellow (1951)
- Scientific career
- Fields: Astrophysics
- Workplaces: Tsing Hua University; University of Chicago; University of California, Berkeley; Goddard Space Flight Center; Institute for Advanced Study; Catholic University of America; Northwestern University
- Thesis: Wave Mechanical Calculations in Astrophysical Interest (1949)
- Doctoral advisor: Otto Struve

Su-Shu Huang
- Traditional Chinese: 黃授書
- Simplified Chinese: 黄授书
Transcriptions
Standard Mandarin
- Hanyu Pinyin: Huáng Shòu-shū

Su-Shu Huang (黃授書, April 16, 1915 – September 15, 1977) was a Chinese-born American astrophysicist. A graduate of the University of Chicago, Huang began his career with the study of the continuous absorption coefficients of two-electron systems, but eventually his research focus turned to the study of stellar atmospheres, radiative transfer, and binary and multiple star systems. In subsequent years, Huang began to cover the topic of life on extrasolar planets and the prerequisites thereof, coining the term "habitable zone" to refer to the region around a star where planets could support liquid water at their surfaces at a 1959 conference of the Astronomical Society of the Pacific.

== Education and career ==
A native of China, Huang earned his master's degree at Tsing Hua University, lecturing in astronomy at that institution from 1943 to 1947 before immigrating to the United States, earning a doctorate in astronomy from the University of Chicago in 1949. After teaching astronomy at that institution for the two following years, Huang became an astronomer at the University of California, Berkeley, a position he stayed in before moving to the Goddard Space Flight Center in Maryland in 1959. Concurrent with his Goddard position, Huang was a member of Institute for Advanced Study at Princeton from 1960 to 1961, then a professor of astrophysics at the Catholic University of America from 1963 to 1964. In 1964, Huang became professor of physics and astronomy at Northwestern University, though he stayed at Goddard until 1965.

In his early years he studied two-electron systems, Huang later studied stellar atmospheres, radiative zones, and the dynamics of stars in binary or multiple star systems. Huang's research into the physics of stars later led him to delineate the types of stars that could support extraterrestrial life, leading to his coining of the term "habitable zone" and eventually his study of planetary habitability in a 1960 paper on the sizes of habitable planets. Huang's explorations into extraterrestrial life were also published in popular works, such as American Scientist and Scientific American.

== Later life and legacy ==
Late in his life, Huang made two trips to China, in 1974 and 1977. He died of a heart attack in Beijing during the latter trip, on September 15. Two years after his death, the then newly discovered main-belt asteroid 3014 Huangsushu was named in his honor.
