= Habitable Planets for Man =

Book by Stephen Dole

- First edition cover
- Author: Stephen Dole
- Publisher: Blaisdell Publishing Company
- Publication date: 1964
- ISBN: 0833042270

Habitable Planets For Man is a work by Stephen Dole, first edition published by Blaisdell Publishing Company, A division of Ginn and Company, copyright 1964 by The RAND Corporation. Originally 158 pages, it was republished in a posthumous second edition in 2007, as Planets for Man.

The revised edition, 174 pages, contains a detailed scientific study on the nature of worlds that may support life in the universe, the probability of their existence, and ways of finding them. It includes assessments of 14 stars within 22 light years with a relatively high probability of having habitable planets (a collective probability of 43%). Writing in a Scientific American blog in 2011, Caleb Scharf called it "extraordinarily detailed and prescient".

== Publication data ==
- ISBN 0833042270
- ISBN 978-0833042279
