= Progress M-24M =

Russian cargo spacecraft

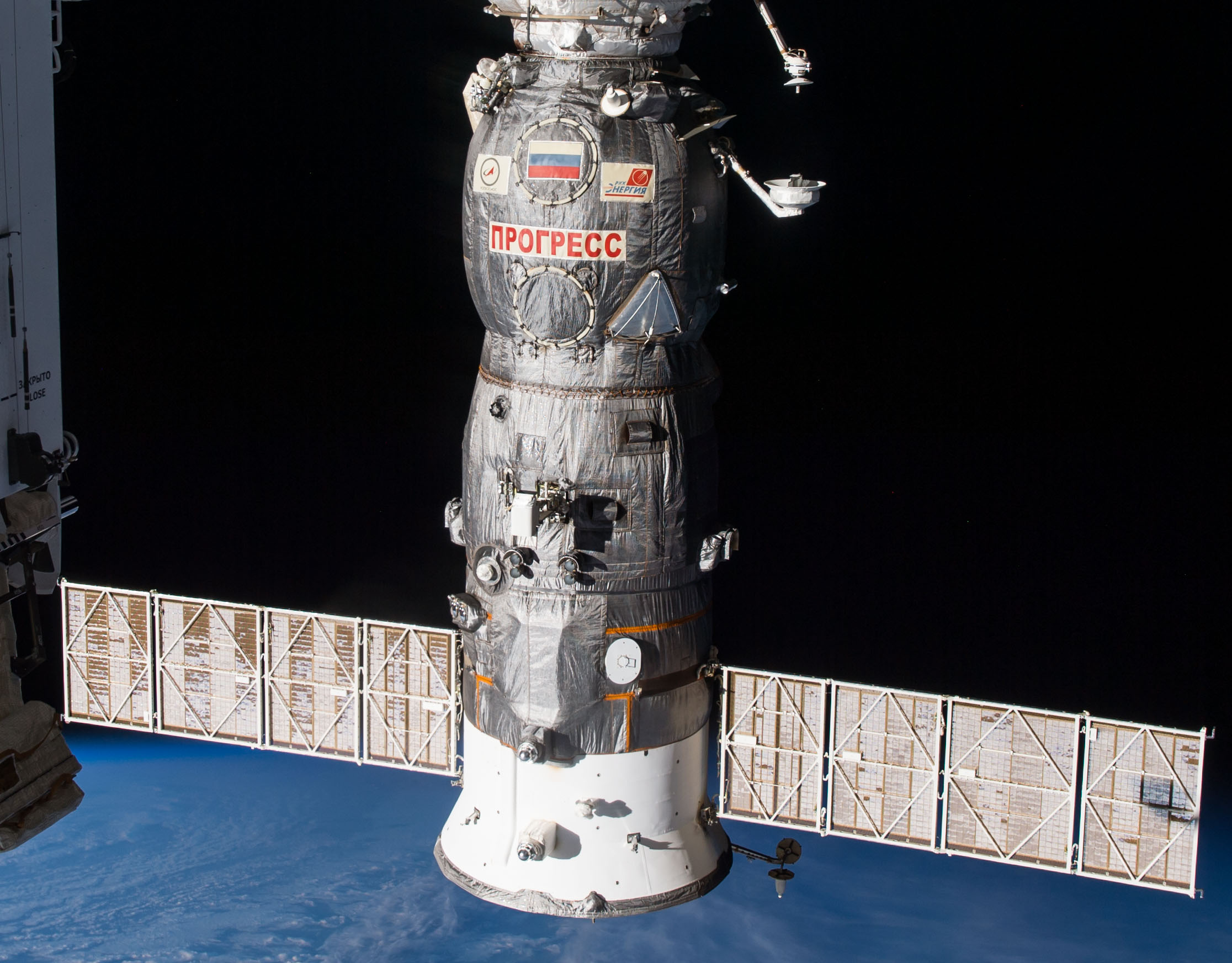
- Night time view of Progress M-24M docked at the ISS.
- Mission type: ISS resupply
- Operator: Roskosmos
- COSPAR ID: 2014-042A
- SATCAT no.: 40097
- Mission duration: 119 days

Spacecraft properties
- Spacecraft type: Progress-M s/n 424
- Manufacturer: RKK Energia
- Launch mass: 7290 kg

Start of mission
- Launch date: 23 July 2014, 21:44:44 UTC
- Rocket: Soyuz-U
- Launch site: Baikonur, Site 1/5

End of mission
- Disposal: Deorbited
- Decay date: 19 November 2014, 23:46 UTC

Orbital parameters
- Reference system: Geocentric
- Regime: Low Earth
- Inclination: 51.6°
- Epoch: 23 July 2014

Docking with ISS
- Docking port: Pirs
- Docking date: 24 July 2014, 03:31 UTC
- Undocking date: 27 October 2014, 05:38 UTC
- Time docked: 95 days

Cargo
- Mass: 2322 kg
- Pressurised: 1283 kg
- Fuel: 880 kg
- Gaseous: 48 kg
- Water: 420 kg
- Progress ISS Resupply

Progress M-24M (Russian: Прогресс М-24М), identified by NASA as Progress 56P, is a Progress spacecraft used by Roskosmos to resupply the International Space Station (ISS) during 2014. Progress M-24M was launched on a six-hours rendezvous profile towards the ISS. The 24th Progress-M 11F615A60 spacecraft to be launched, it had the serial number 424 and was built by RKK Energia.

== Launch ==
The spacecraft was launched on 23 July 2014 at 21:44:44 UTC from the Baikonur Cosmodrome in Kazakhstan.

== Docking ==
Progress M-24M docked with the Pirs docking compartment on 24 July 2014 at 03:31 UTC, less than six hours after launch.

== Cargo ==
The Progress spacecraft carries 2322 kg of cargo and supplies to the International Space Station.

== See also ==
- 2014 in spaceflight
