= Cryomyces antarcticus =

Scientific classification
- Kingdom: Fungi
- Division: Ascomycota
- Class: Dothideomycetes
- Family: incertae sedis
- Genus: Cryomyces
- Species: C. antarcticus

Binomial name
- Cryomyces antarcticus Selbmann, L.; Hoog, G.S. de; Mazzaglia, A.; Friedmann, E.I.; Onofri, S., 2005

Species of fungus

Cryomyces antarcticus is a fungus of uncertain placement in the class Dothideomycetes, division Ascomycota. Found in Antarctica, C. antarcticus was formally described as a novel species in 2005. This species has been found to be able to survive the harsh outer space environment and cosmic radiation. A proposed mechanistic contributor to the unique resilience observed in C. antarcticus is the presence of its thick and highly melanized cell walls. This melanin may act to protect DNA from damage while C. antarcticus is exposed to conditions that are unsuitable for typical DNA repair systems to function.
