= Alicyclobacillus aeris =

Scientific classification
- Domain: Bacteria
- Kingdom: Bacillati
- Phylum: Bacillota
- Class: Bacilli
- Order: Bacillales
- Family: Alicyclobacillaceae
- Genus: Alicyclobacillus
- Species: A. aeris

Binomial name
- Alicyclobacillus aeris Guo et al. 2009

Species of bacterium

Alicyclobacillus aeris is a species of Gram positive/Gram variable, strictly aerobic, bacterium. The bacteria are acidophilic and produced endospores. It was first isolated from a copper mine in Inner Mongolia, China. The species was first described in 2009, and the name is derived from the Latin aeris (of ore).

The optimum growth temperature for A. aeris is 30 °C, and can grow in the 25-35 °C range. The optimum pH is 3.5, and can grow in pH 2.0-6.0.

Alicyclobacillus aeris can oxidize iron and sulfur, as can Alicyclobacillus disulfidooxidans, A. ferrooxydans, and A. tolerans. Alicyclobacillus fodiniaquatilis was isolated from a different copper mine.
