= Effusibacillus lacus =

Scientific classification
- Domain: Bacteria
- Kingdom: Bacillati
- Phylum: Bacillota
- Class: Bacilli
- Order: Bacillales
- Family: Alicyclobacillaceae
- Genus: Effusibacillus
- Species: E. lacus

Binomial name
- Effusibacillus lacus Watanabe et al 2014

Species of bacterium

Effusibacillus lacus is a species of Gram positive, facultatively anaerobic, thermophilic bacterium. The cells are rod-shaped and form spores. It was first isolated from freshwater lake sediment from Lake Mizugaki, Japan. The species name is derived from lacus (of a lake).

The species was among the first grouped into the newly created genus Effusibacillus, along with two other species that were reclassified from Alicyclobacillus, E. consociatus and E. pohliae. E. lacus is the type strain for the genus.

The optimum growth temperature for E. lacus is 50-52 °C, and can grow in the 28-60 °C range. Its optimum pH is 7.25-7.50, and grows in pH range 7.0-8.5.
