= Alicyclobacillus ferrooxydans =

Scientific classification
- Domain: Bacteria
- Kingdom: Bacillati
- Phylum: Bacillota
- Class: Bacilli
- Order: Bacillales
- Family: Alicyclobacillaceae
- Genus: Alicyclobacillus
- Species: A. ferrooxydans

Binomial name
- Alicyclobacillus ferrooxydans Jiang et al. 2008

Species of bacterium

Alicyclobacillus ferrooxydans is a species of Gram positive, strictly aerobic, bacterium. The bacteria are acidophilic and produce endospores. It was first isolated from solfataric soil. The species was first described in 2008, and the name refers to its ability to oxidize iron.

Other Alicyclobacillus species that are able to oxidize iron include A. disulfidooxidans, A. pohliae, and A. tolerans.

The optimum growth temperature for A. ferrooxydans is 28 °C, and can grow in the 17-40 °C range. The optimum pH is 3.0, and can grow in pH 2.0-6.0.

A. ferrooxydans was found to be able to produce high amounts of biosurfactants that interacted with pyrite, and was able to change surface properties of pyrite.
