= Tumebacillus algifaecis =

Scientific classification
- Domain: Bacteria
- Kingdom: Bacillati
- Phylum: Bacillota
- Class: Bacilli
- Order: Bacillales
- Family: Alicyclobacillaceae
- Genus: Tumebacillus
- Species: T. algifaecis

Binomial name
- Tumebacillus algifaecis Wu et al. 2015

Species of bacterium

Tumebacillus algifaecis is a species of Gram positive, facultatively anaerobic, bacterium. The cells are rod-shaped and form spores. It was first isolated from an algal bloom in Taihu Lake, China. The species was first described in 2015, and the name is derived from Latin alga (algae) and faex (faecis sediment, scum) and refers to its original isolation from the algal bloom.

The optimum growth temperature for T. algifaecis is 30 °C, and can grow in the 20-45 °C range. Its optimum pH is 6.5-7.5, and grows in pH range 5.5-9.5. The bacterium forms white colonies on R2A agar.
