= Tumebacillus soli =

Scientific classification
- Domain: Bacteria
- Kingdom: Bacillati
- Phylum: Bacillota
- Class: Bacilli
- Order: Bacillales
- Family: Alicyclobacillaceae
- Genus: Tumebacillus
- Species: T. soli

Binomial name
- Tumebacillus soli Kim and Kim 2016

Species of bacterium

Tumebacillus soli is a species of Gram positive, aerobic, bacterium. The cells are rod-shaped, motile, and form spores. It was first isolated from soil in Danghangpo, South Korea. The species was first described in 2015, and the name refers to its initial isolation from soil.

The optimum growth temperature for T. soli is 37 °C, and can grow in the 25-45 °C range. Its optimum pH is 8.0, and grows in pH range 5.5-8.5. The bacterium forms cream-colored colonies on R2A agar.
