= Tumebacillus avium =

Scientific classification
- Domain: Bacteria
- Kingdom: Bacillati
- Phylum: Bacillota
- Class: Bacilli
- Order: Bacillales
- Family: Alicyclobacillaceae
- Genus: Tumebacillus
- Species: T. avium

Binomial name
- Tumebacillus avium Sung et al. 2018

Species of bacterium

Tumebacillus avium is a species of Gram positive, facultatively aerobic, bacterium. The cells are rod-shaped, motile, and form spores. It was first isolated from faecal sample of a cinereous vulture (Aegypius monachus) from the Seoul Grand Park Zoo, Seoul, South Korea. The species was first described in 2018, and the name is derived from Latin avium (of the birds).

The optimum growth temperature for T. avium is 25-30 °C, and can grow in the 4-37 °C range. Its optimum pH is 7.0, and grows in pH range 6.0-9.0. The bacterium forms white colonies on R2A agar.
