= Tumebacillus flagellatus =

Scientific classification
- Domain: Bacteria
- Kingdom: Bacillati
- Phylum: Bacillota
- Class: Bacilli
- Order: Bacillales
- Family: Alicyclobacillaceae
- Genus: Tumebacillus
- Species: T. flagellatus

Binomial name
- Tumebacillus flagellatus Wang et al. 2013

Species of bacterium

Tumebacillus flagellatus is a species of Gram positive, aerobic, bacterium. The cells are rod-shaped, motile, and form spores. It was first isolated from wastewater from a cassava processing plant in Guangxi, China. The species was first described in 2013, and the name refers to the flagella found in the cells. T. flagellatus was the third species of Tumebacillus to be discovered, but was the first found to be motile. T. flagellatus was found during a survey for bacteria that were able to hydrolyze pullulan or starch.

The optimum growth temperature for T. flagellatus is 37 °C, and can grow in the 20-42 °C range. Its optimum pH is 5.5, and grows in pH range 4.5-8.5. The bacterium forms light yellow colonies on R2A agar.
