= Tumebacillus ginsengisoli =

Scientific classification
- Domain: Bacteria
- Kingdom: Bacillati
- Phylum: Bacillota
- Class: Bacilli
- Order: Bacillales
- Family: Alicyclobacillaceae
- Genus: Tumebacillus
- Species: T. ginsengisoli

Binomial name
- Tumebacillus ginsengisoli Baek et al. 2011

Species of bacterium

Tumebacillus ginsengisoli is a species of Gram positive, aerobic, bacterium. The cells are rod-shaped, non-motile, and form spores. It was first isolated from soil in a ginseng field in Pocheon, South Korea, and the species name is derived from the ginseng soil isolation location. T. ginsengisoli was the second species added to the genus Tumebacillus.

The optimum growth temperature for T. ginsengisoli is 25-30 °C, and it can grow in the 25-42 °C range. Its optimum pH is 6.0-9.0, and grows in pH range 5.0-9.0. The bacterium forms white colonies on R2A agar.
