= Tumebacillus luteolus =

Scientific classification
- Domain: Bacteria
- Kingdom: Bacillati
- Phylum: Bacillota
- Class: Bacilli
- Order: Bacillales
- Family: Alicyclobacillaceae
- Genus: Tumebacillus
- Species: T. luteolus

Binomial name
- Tumebacillus luteolus Her et al. 2015

Species of bacterium

Tumebacillus luteolus is a species of Gram positive, aerobic, bacterium. The cells are rod-shaped, non-motile, and form spores. It was first isolated from soil in Ukraine. The species was first described in 2015, and the name is derived from Latin luteolus (yellowish), referring to the colony color on R2A agar.

The optimum growth temperature for T. luteolus is 28-37 °C, and can grow in the 25-42 °C range. Its optimum pH is 6.0-9.0, and grows in pH range 5.0-9.0. The bacterium forms yellow colonies on nutrient agar.
