= Tumebacillus =

Scientific classification
- Domain: Bacteria
- Kingdom: Bacillati
- Phylum: Bacillota
- Class: Bacilli
- Order: Bacillales
- Family: Alicyclobacillaceae
- Genus: Tumebacillus; Steven et al. 2008

Type species
- Tumebacillus permanentifrigoris Steven et al. 2008

Species
- T. algifaecis; T. amylolyticus; T. avium; T. flagellatus; T. ginsengisoli; T. lacus; T. lipolyticus; T. luteolus; T. permanentifrigoris; T. soli

Genus of bacteria

Tumebacillus is a genus of Gram-positive, rod-shaped, spore-forming bacteria. Members of the genus can be motile or non-motile, and form white or yellow colonies on R2A agar.

The genus was first proposed in 2008 from the discovery of a potentially 5000-7000 year-old bacterium from Canadian high arctic permafrost, which would become the type strain of the genus T. permanentifrigoris. The genus name was derived from Latin tume (from tumefacere, to make swollen) and bacillus (small rod), referring to the swollen sporangia produced by T. permanentifrigoris and the shape of the cells.

Members of this genus have been isolated from arctic permafrost, soil samples, cassava wastewater, decomposing algal scum, river water, and the gut of a vulture. Tumebacillus was found during surveys of nasal airways of infants, an underground subway in Norway, and a mountain observatory in Austria.

== Phylogeny ==
The currently accepted taxonomy is based on the List of Prokaryotic names with Standing in Nomenclature (LPSN) and National Center for Biotechnology Information (NCBI)

16S rRNA based LTP_10_2024

- Tumebacillus
  - T. lacus Zhang et al. 2023
  - - - T. lipolyticus Prasad et al. 2015
      - - T. algifaecis Wu et al. 2015
        - T. avium Sung et al. 2018
    - - T. ginsengisoli Baek et al. 2011
      - - - T. luteolus Her, Srinivasan & Lee 2015
          - T. soli Kim & Kim 2016
        - - T. flagellatus Wang et al. 2013
          - - T. amylolyticus Kang et al. 2022
            - T. permanentifrigoris Steven et al. 2008

120 marker proteins based GTDB 09-RS220

- Tumebacillus
  - - T. algifaecis
    - T. avium
  - - T. permanentifrigoris
    - - T. amylolyticus
      - T. flagellatus

== See also ==
- List of bacterial orders
- List of bacteria genera
