= Alicyclobacillus montanus =

Scientific classification
- Domain: Bacteria
- Kingdom: Bacillati
- Phylum: Bacillota
- Class: Bacilli
- Order: Bacillales
- Family: Alicyclobacillaceae
- Genus: Alicyclobacillus
- Species: A. montanus

Binomial name
- Alicyclobacillus montanus Lopez et al. 2018

Species of bacterium

Alicyclobacillus montanus is a species of Gram positive, strictly aerobic, thermophilic bacterium. The bacteria are acidophilic and produce endospores. It was first isolated from an acidic hot spring in Los Nevados National Natural Park in the Andes Mountains of Colombia. The species was first described in 2018, and the name refers to the Andes Mountains from which it was isolated.

The optimum growth temperature for A. montanus is 45 °C, and can grow in the 25-55 °C range. The optimum pH is 3.0, and can grow in pH 1.5-4.5.
