= Alicyclobacillus fastidiosus =

Scientific classification
- Domain: Bacteria
- Kingdom: Bacillati
- Phylum: Bacillota
- Class: Bacilli
- Order: Bacillales
- Family: Alicyclobacillaceae
- Genus: Alicyclobacillus
- Species: A. fastidiosus

Binomial name
- Alicyclobacillus fastidiosus Goto et al. 2007

Species of bacterium

Alicyclobacillus fastidiosus is a species of Gram positive, strictly aerobic, bacterium. The bacteria are acidophilic and produce endospores. It was first isolated from apple juice. The species was first described in 2007, and the name refers to the fastidious nature of the organism; the bacteria would start to die off after 7 days when plated on typical agar for isolating Alicyclobacillus. Additionally, the species produced fewer spores than other members of its genus, and took much longer to produce the spores (i.e. several days versus 10 days).

The optimum growth temperature for A. fastidiosus is 40–45 °C, and can grow in the 20–55 °C range. The optimum pH is 4.0–4.5, and cannot grow at pH 2.0 or pH 5.5.

A. fastidiosus was found during a Japanese survey of various beverages and environments, which also discovered 5 other species of Alicyclobacillus: A. contaminans, A. kakegawensis, A. macrosporangiidus, A. sacchari, and A. shizuokensis.
