= A. pomorum =

A. pomorum may refer to:

- Acetobacter pomorum, a Gram-negative bacterium.
- Alicyclobacillus pomorum, a Gram-positive bacterium.
- Ampedus pomorum, a species of click beetle.
- Anthonomus pomorum, a species of weevil that feeds on apple trees.
