= Alicyclobacillus cycloheptanicus =

Scientific classification
- Domain: Bacteria
- Kingdom: Bacillati
- Phylum: Bacillota
- Class: Bacilli
- Order: Bacillales
- Family: Alicyclobacillaceae
- Genus: Alicyclobacillus
- Species: A. cycloheptanicus

Binomial name
- Alicyclobacillus cycloheptanicus Wisotzkey et al. 1992

Species of bacterium

Alicyclobacillus cycloheptanicus is a species of Gram positive, strictly aerobic, bacterium. The bacteria are acidophilic and produce endospores. It was first isolated from soil. The species was originally classified as Bacillus cycloheptanicus in 1987, but further 16S rRNA studies found that the species belonged in the newly created genus Alicyclobacillus. The species name refers ω-cycloheptane fatty acids in the cell membrane.

A. cycloheptanicus was among the first three species reclassified from the genus Bacillus to the newly created Alicyclobacillus in 1992, along with A. acidocaldarius and A. acidoterrestris.

The optimum growth temperature for A. cycloheptanicus is 48 °C, and can grow in the 40-53 °C range. The optimum pH is 3.5-4.5, and can grow in pH 3.0-5.5.
