= Alicyclobacillus kakegawensis =

Scientific classification
- Domain: Bacteria
- Kingdom: Bacillati
- Phylum: Bacillota
- Class: Bacilli
- Order: Bacillales
- Family: Alicyclobacillaceae
- Genus: Alicyclobacillus
- Species: A. kakegawensis

Binomial name
- Alicyclobacillus kakegawensis Goto et al. 2007

Species of bacterium

Alicyclobacillus kakegawensis is a species of Gram positive, strictly aerobic, bacterium. The bacteria are acidophilic and produce endospores. It was first isolated from soil in Kakegawa, Japan. The species was first described in 2007, and the named after the city from which it was first isolated.

The optimum growth temperature for A. kakegawensis is 50-55 °C, and can grow in the 40-60 °C range. The optimum pH is 4.0-4.5, and cannot grow at pH 3.0 or pH 6.5.

Alicyclobacillus kakegawensis was found during a Japanese survey of various beverages and environments, which also discovered 5 other species of Alicyclobacillus: A. contaminans, A. fastidiosus, A. macrosporangiidus, A. sacchari, and A. shizuokensis.
