= Alicyclobacillus acidiphilus =

Scientific classification
- Domain: Bacteria
- Kingdom: Bacillati
- Phylum: Bacillota
- Class: Bacilli
- Order: Bacillales
- Family: Alicyclobacillaceae
- Genus: Alicyclobacillus
- Species: A. acidiphilus

Binomial name
- Alicyclobacillus acidiphilus Matsubara et al. 2002

Species of bacterium

Alicyclobacillus acidiphilus is a thermo-acidophilic, omega-alicyclic fatty acid-containing bacterium. It's aerobic, gram-positive, spore-forming and rod-shaped, with type strain TA-67^{T} (= DSM 14558^{T} = IAM 14935^{T} = NRIC 6496^{T}).

The optimum growth temperature for A. acidiphilus is 50 °C, and can grow in the 20-55 °C range. The optimum pH is 3.0, and can grow in pH 2.5-5.5.
