= Kyrpidia tusciae =

Scientific classification
- Domain: Bacteria
- Kingdom: Bacillati
- Phylum: Bacillota
- Class: Bacilli
- Order: Bacillales
- Family: Alicyclobacillaceae
- Genus: Kyrpidia
- Species: K. tusciae

Binomial name
- Kyrpidia tusciae Bonjour and Agano 1984

Species of bacterium

Kyrpidia tusciae is a species of Gram positive, facultatively anaerobic, thermophilic bacterium. The cells are rod-shaped and form spores.

Kyrpidia tusciae was first isolated from ponds in a fumerole in Tuscany, Italy. It was originally classified as Bacillus tusciae in 1984, but in 2011 further tests led to the creation of the genus Kyrpidia, of which K. tusciae was the first and only member.

The optimum growth temperature for K. tusciae is 55 °C, and can grow in the 42-67 °C range. Its optimum pH is 4.2-4.8, and grows in pH range 4.2-7.5.
