= CD Genomics =

Genomics services company

- Company type: Private
- Industry: Biotech, Life sciences
- Headquarters: New York, United States
- Products: Sequencing, genotyping, aptamer, genome, genetic health
- Website: www.cd-genomics.com

CD Genomics is a genomics services company that provides sequencing services, genotyping and library construction by developing integrated systems of genomic products and services. The company sells products in the United States, Europe, and Asia. Genome projects by CD Genomics include Illumina, the genome sequence, DNA analyzer, Bacillus thuringiensis, Thermoanaerobacter, tengcongensis, Streptococcus suis, and several viral genomes.

== Founding ==
CD Genomics is a modern sequencing provider. The company is headquartered in Shirley, New York, United States and also maintains operations in North Carolina, Europe and Asia.
