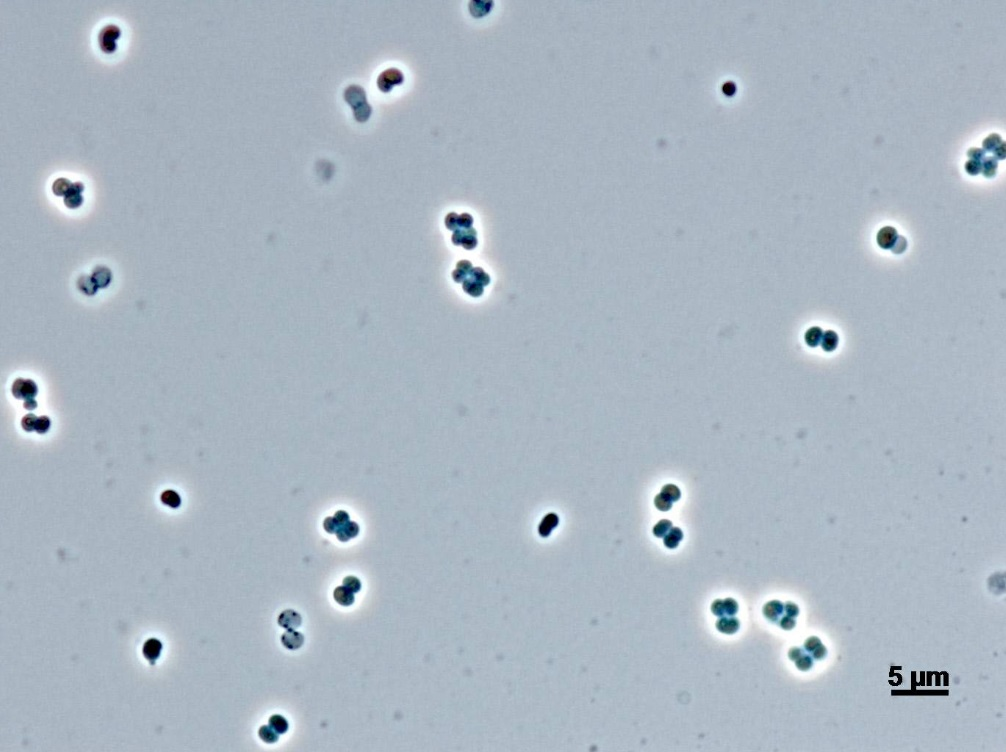
- Abditibacterium utsteinense

Scientific classification
- Domain: Bacteria
- Kingdom: Pseudomonadati
- Phylum: Abditibacteriota; Tahon, 2018

Class
- Abditibacteriia

= Abditibacteriota =

Phylum of bacteria

Abditibacteriota is a bacterial phylum previously known as FBP candidatus, which is widespread in extreme environments on Earth, from polar and desert ecosystems to wastewater and contaminated mining sites. The first cultured representative came from Utsteinen in the Sør Rondane Mountains (East Antarctica) and is a chemoheterotrophic, gram-negative, aerobic and oligotrophic bacterium. It has a limited number of carbon sources, optimized metabolism for survival in low nutrient habitats. Extreme resistance against antibiotics and toxic compounds was identified. Phylogenetically, it would be related to the phylum Armatimonadota according to molecular analysis.

== Member species ==
- Abditibacterium utsteinense, a gram-negative chemoheterotroph found in antarctic soil.

== See also ==
- List of bacterial orders
- List of bacteria genera
