= Tumebacillus lipolyticus =

Scientific classification
- Domain: Bacteria
- Kingdom: Bacillati
- Phylum: Bacillota
- Class: Bacilli
- Order: Bacillales
- Family: Alicyclobacillaceae
- Genus: Tumebacillus
- Species: T. lipolyticus

Binomial name
- Tumebacillus lipolyticus Prasad et al. 2015

Species of bacterium

Tumebacillus lipolyticus is a species of Gram positive, aerobic, bacterium. The cells are rod-shaped, non-motile, and form spores. It was first isolated from surface water of Godavari River in Kapileswarapuram, India. The species was first described in 2015, and the name is derived from Greek lipos (fat) and lytikos (able to loosen, able to dissolve), referring to the species ability to hydrolyze lipids.

The optimum growth temperature for T. lipolyticus is 37 °C, and can grow in the 20-40 °C range. Its optimum pH is 7.0, and grows in pH range 6.0-9.0. The bacterium forms cream-colored colonies on nutrient agar.
