= Alicyclobacillus macrosporangiidus =

Scientific classification
- Domain: Bacteria
- Kingdom: Bacillati
- Phylum: Bacillota
- Class: Bacilli
- Order: Bacillales
- Family: Alicyclobacillaceae
- Genus: Alicyclobacillus
- Species: A. macrosporangiidus

Binomial name
- Alicyclobacillus macrosporangiidus Goto et al. 2007

Species of bacterium

Alicyclobacillus macrosporangiidus is a species of Gram positive, strictly aerobic, bacterium. The bacteria are acidophilic and produce endospores. It was first isolated from soil in a crop field in Fujieda, Japan. The species was first described in 2007, and the name is derived from the Latin macros (big) and sporangium (sporangia), referring to the large spores produced by the organism.

The optimum growth temperature for A. macrosporangiidus is 50-55 °C, and can grow in the 35-60 °C range. The optimum pH is 4.0-4.5, and cannot grow at pH 3.0 or pH 6.5.

A. macrosporangiidus was found during a Japanese survey of various beverages and environments, which also discovered 5 other species of Alicyclobacillus: A. contaminans, A. fastidiosus, A. kakegawensis, A. sacchari, and A. shizuokensis.
