= Alicyclobacillus vulcanalis =

Scientific classification
- Domain: Bacteria
- Kingdom: Bacillati
- Phylum: Bacillota
- Class: Bacilli
- Order: Bacillales
- Family: Alicyclobacillaceae
- Genus: Alicyclobacillus
- Species: A. vulcanalis

Binomial name
- Alicyclobacillus vulcanalis Simbahan et al. 2004

Species of bacterium

Alicyclobacillus vulcanalis is a species of Gram positive, strictly aerobic, thermophilic bacterium. The bacteria are acidophilic and produce endospores. It was first isolated from water in a hot spring from Coso Hot Springs, California, United States. The species was first described in 2004, and the name refers to Vulcan, the Roman god of fire and metal working.

The optimum growth temperature for A. vulcanalis is 55 °C, and can grow in the 35-65 °C range. The optimum pH is 4.0, and can grow in pH 2.0-6.0. Many of its enzymes have been investigated for potential biotechnological uses.
