= Alicyclobacillus cellulosilyticus =

Scientific classification
- Domain: Bacteria
- Kingdom: Bacillati
- Phylum: Bacillota
- Class: Bacilli
- Order: Bacillales
- Family: Alicyclobacillaceae
- Genus: Alicyclobacillus
- Species: A. cellulosilyticus

Binomial name
- Alicyclobacillus cellulosilyticus Kusube et al. 2014

Species of bacterium

Alicyclobacillus cellulosilyticus is a species of acidophilic, thermophilic, strictly aerobic, bacterium. The bacteria Gram stains negative and produce endospores. It was first "isolated from steamed Japanese cedar chips from a lumber mill in Gobō, Wakayama Japan." The species was first described in 2014, and the name refers to the species' ability to digest cellulose.

The optimum growth temperature for A. cellulosilyticus is 55 °C, and can grow in the 40–67.5 °C range. The optimum pH is 4.8, and can grow in pH 3.5-6.5.
