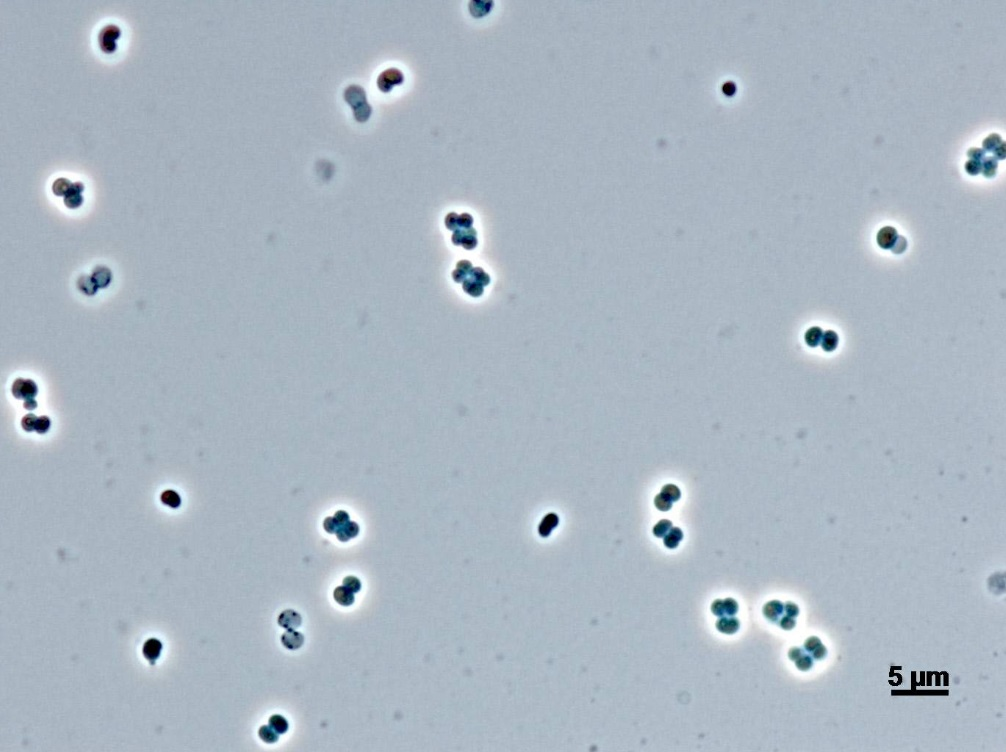
- A. utsteinense depicted on a microscope slide.

Scientific classification
- Domain: Bacteria
- Kingdom: Bacillati
- Phylum: Abditibacteriota
- Class: Abditibacteria
- Order: Abditibacteriales
- Family: Abditibacteriaceae
- Genus: Abditibacterium
- Species: A. utsteinense

Binomial name
- Abditibacterium utsteinense Tahon et al. 2018

= Abditibacterium =

Genus of bacteria

Abditibacterium is a genus of bacteria, with the type and only species being Abditibacterium utsteinense, a psychrophilic, Gram-negative bacteria. This bacterium is aerobic, oligotrophic and chemoheterotrophic. It was first isolated from a terrestrial surface sample in East Antarctica.

== Taxonomy ==
Abditibacterium utsteinense is the type species of the genus Abditibacterium, belonging to the family Abditibacteriaceae, order Abditibacteriales, class Abditibacteria, and phylum Abditibacteriota. The phylum Abditibacteriota was proposed to accommodate the former candidate phylum FBP.

Phylogenetic analysis based on 16S rRNA gene sequences and ribosomal proteins confirms its placement within the Abditibacteriota phylum, closely related to Armatimonadetes.

The genus name Abditibacterium is derived from the Latin words "abditus" meaning remote or secluded, and "bacterium" referring to a small rod, thus meaning a small rod hiding in remote places. The species name utsteinense refers to Utsteinen, the location in Antarctica where the type strain was first isolated.

== Description ==
Abditibacterium utsteinense is a bacterium with cells ranging from 0.6–1.0 μm in width and 0.65–1.3 μm in length. It is Gram-positive and does not form spores. Colonies are flat, smooth, and circular, with a diameter of 0.25–1.3 mm after 5–12 weeks of growth at 18 °C. Colonies exhibit a light-pink color with a light-red center when grown on agar-based media. The bacterium is catalase-positive and oxidase-negative. The major cellular fatty acids are 16:1 ω7c/15 iso 2OH (34.3%) and 18:1 ω7c (15.6%).

The type strain of Abditibacterium utsteinense is LMG 29911^{T}, also known as R-68213^{T} and DSM 105287^{T}. It is available in culture collections under the strain numbers DSM 105287 and LMG 29911. The 16S rRNA gene sequence is available under accession number KY386500. The genome sequence is available under accession number GCA_002973605. The GC-content of the type strain is 54.27 mol%.

Abditibacterium utsteinense strain R-68213^{T} was isolated from a top surface sample of weathered granite parent material at an elevation of 1382 m in Utsteinen, Sør Rondane Mountains, East Antarctica, near the Belgian Princess Elisabeth Station. The isolation site is characterized by a cold, alpine climate and terrestrial, geologic environment.

== Physiology ==
Abditibacterium utsteinense is an obligately aerobic chemoheterotroph. It is oligotrophic, adapted to low-nutrient conditions. Growth occurs between 1 and 45 °C, with the optimum temperature at 15–18 °C. No growth occurs at 52 °C, or under microaerophilic or anaerobic conditions. The optimal pH for growth is between 7.0 and 7.5, with growth observed in a pH range of 6.5–8.0. It can tolerate up to 0.5% NaCl on solid medium and does not require NaCl for growth. The bacterium displays resistance to multiple antibiotics and toxic compounds.

Abditibacterium utsteinense possesses a central metabolism that includes the Embden-Meyerhof-Parnas pathway for glycolysis, the pentose phosphate pathway, and the tricarboxylic acid cycle. It has a versatile nitrogen metabolism and can utilize ammonium, urea, nitrate, and nitrite. The bacterium can utilize carbon sources such as D-glucose, sucrose, sodium pyruvate, sodium succinate, and sodium acetate for growth on solid PH-5 medium.

== See also ==
- List of bacterial orders
- List of bacteria genera
