= Alicyclobacillus sendaiensis =

Scientific classification
- Domain: Bacteria
- Kingdom: Bacillati
- Phylum: Bacillota
- Class: Bacilli
- Order: Bacillales
- Family: Alicyclobacillaceae
- Genus: Alicyclobacillus
- Species: A. sendaiensis

Binomial name
- Alicyclobacillus sendaiensis Tsuruoka et al. 2003

Species of bacterium

Alicyclobacillus sendaiensis is a species of Gram positive, strictly aerobic, bacterium. The bacteria are acidophilic and produced endospores. It was first isolated from soil in Aoba-yama Park, Sendai, Japan. The species was first described in 2003, and the name refers to the city from which it was first isolated. It was found during a survey in search of bacteria that produce thermostable collagenase.

The optimum growth temperature for A. sendaiensis is 55 °C, and can grow in the 40-65 °C range. The optimum pH is 5.5, and can grow in pH 2.5-6.5.
