= Alicyclobacillus contaminans =

Scientific classification
- Domain: Bacteria
- Kingdom: Bacillati
- Phylum: Bacillota
- Class: Bacilli
- Order: Bacillales
- Family: Alicyclobacillaceae
- Genus: Alicyclobacillus
- Species: A. contaminans

Binomial name
- Alicyclobacillus contaminans Goto et al. 2007

Species of bacterium

Alicyclobacillus contaminans is a species of Gram positive, strictly aerobic, bacterium. The bacteria are acidophilic and produce endospores. It was first isolated during a survey from both orange juice, and soil in Fuji City, Japan. The species was first described in 2007, and the name is derived from the Latin contaminans (contaminating).

The optimum growth temperature for A. contaminans is 50-55 °C, and can grow in the 35-60 °C range. The optimum pH is 4.0-4.5, and cannot grow at pH 3.0 or pH 6.0.

A. contaminans was found during a Japanese survey of various beverages and environments, which also discovered 5 other species of Alicyclobacillus: A. fastidiosus, A. kakegawensis, A. macrosporangiidus, A. sacchari, and A. shizuokensis.
