= Alicyclobacillus acidocaldarius =

Scientific classification
- Domain: Bacteria
- Kingdom: Bacillati
- Phylum: Bacillota
- Class: Bacilli
- Order: Bacillales
- Family: Alicyclobacillaceae
- Genus: Alicyclobacillus
- Species: A. acidocaldarius

Binomial name
- Alicyclobacillus acidocaldarius Wisotzkey et al. 1992

Subspecies
- subsp. acidocaldarius; subsp. rittmannii

Species of bacterium

Alicyclobacillus acidocaldarius is a species of Gram positive, strictly aerobic, bacterium. The bacteria are acidophilic, thermophilic, and produce endospores. The first identified strains of A. acidocaldarius were from geysers in Yellowstone National Park and fumerole soil in Hawaii Volcano National Park. The species was originally classified as Bacillus acidocaldarius in 1971, but further 16S rRNA studies found that the species belonged in the newly created genus Alicyclobacillus. The species name is derived from the Latin acidum (acid) and caldarius (pertaining to warm or hot), referring to the acidic and high temperature environments from which it was first isolated. Thomas D. Brock was one of the researchers who first categorized the species; his discovery of Thermus aquaticus allowed for other researchers to discover Taq polymerase and polyermase chain reaction (PCR).

A strain of A. acidocaldarius has been isolated from thermally heated soils of Mount Rittmann in Antarctica.

Alicyclobacillus acidocaldarius was among the first three species reclassified from the genus Bacillus to the newly created Alicyclobacillus in 1992, along with A. acidoterrestris and A. cycloheptanicus.

The optimum growth temperature for A. acidocaldarius is 60-65 °C, and can grow in the 45-70 °C range. The optimum pH is 3.0-4.0, and can grow in pH 2.0-6.0.
