= Tumebacillus permanentifrigoris =

Scientific classification
- Domain: Bacteria
- Kingdom: Bacillati
- Phylum: Bacillota
- Class: Bacilli
- Order: Bacillales
- Family: Alicyclobacillaceae
- Genus: Tumebacillus
- Species: T. permanentifrigoris

Binomial name
- Tumebacillus permanentifrigoris Steven et al. 2008

Species of bacterium

Tumebacillus permanentifrigorisis is a species of Gram positive, strictly aerobic, bacterium. The cells are rod-shaped and form spores. It was first isolated from a 9-meter-deep permafrost sample from the Canadian high Arctic. The species was first described in 2008, and the name refers to its original isolation from permafrost. T. permanentifrigoris was the first species in the new genus, Tumebacillus, and is the type species for the genus. The isolate may have survived 5000–7000 years in ice before being discovered.

The optimum growth temperature for T. permanentifrigoris is 25-30 °C, and can grow in the 5-37 °C range and in pH 5.5-8.9. The bacterium would not grow in liquid broth media, but formed yellow colonies on agar.
