= A. hesperidum =

A. hesperidum may refer to:

- Alicyclobacillus hesperidum, a Gram-positive bacterium
- Amitus hesperidum, a species of wasp
