= A. dauci =

A. dauci may refer to:

- Alicyclobacillus dauci, a Gram-positive bacterium
- Alternaria dauci, a fungus that causes carrot leaf blight
