= Alicyclobacillus sacchari =

Scientific classification
- Domain: Bacteria
- Kingdom: Bacillati
- Phylum: Bacillota
- Class: Bacilli
- Order: Bacillales
- Family: Alicyclobacillaceae
- Genus: Alicyclobacillus
- Species: A. sacchari

Binomial name
- Alicyclobacillus sacchari Goto et al. 2007

Species of bacterium

Alicyclobacillus sacchari is a species of Gram positive, strictly aerobic, bacterium. The bacteria are acidophilic and produce endospores. It was first isolated from liquid sugar. The species was first described in 2007, and the name is derived from the Latin sacchari (of sugar).

The optimum growth temperature for A. sacchari is 45-50 °C, and can grow in the 30-55 °C range. The optimum pH is 4.0-4.5, and cannot grow at pH 2.0 or pH 6.0.

A. sacchari was found during a Japanese survey of various beverages and environments, which also discovered 5 other species of Alicyclobacillus: A. contaminans, A. fastidiosus, A. kakegawensis, A. macrosporangiidus, A. contaminans, and A. shizuokensis.
