= Herbarius =

Herbarius may refer to:

- Herbarius moguntinus, illustrated Latin herbal
- Alicyclobacillus herbarius, species of bacteria
