= Chthonomonas =

Scientific classification
- Domain: Bacteria
- Kingdom: Bacillati
- Phylum: Armatimonadota
- Class: Chthonomonadia corrig. Lee et al. 2011
- Order: Chthonomonadales; Lee et al. 2011
- Family: Chthonomonadaceae; Lee et al. 2011
- Genus: Chthonomonas; Lee et al. 2011
- Species: C. calidirosea

Binomial name
- Chthonomonas calidirosea Lee et al. 2011

Species of bacterium

Chthonomonas calidirosea is a Gram-negative bacterium and also the first representative of the new class Chthonomonadetes within the phylum Armatimonadota. The Armatimonadota were previously known as candidate phylum OP10. OP10 was composed solely of environmental 16S rRNA gene clone sequences prior to C. calidirosea's relative, Armatimonas rosea's discovery. It is now known that bacterial communities from geothermal environments, are generally constituted by, at least 5–10% of bacteria belonging to Armatimonadota.

== Discovery ==
Chthonomonas calidirosea was originally isolated from geothermally heated soil at Hell's Gate, Tikitere, New Zealand. The soil was aseptically sampled at an approximate depth of 15 cm below the surface. The sampled soil had a pH of 4.3 and an in situ temperature of 55 °C.

== Relatives ==
The environmental 16S rRNA gene sequences, belonging to the phylum Armatimonadota are currently sorted into six groups. Groups 2, 5, and 6 consist solely of sequences. Group 1 contains Armatimonas rosea, Group 3 contains Chthonomonadetes calidirosea, and Group 4 contains Fimbriimonas ginsengisoli.

- - Fimbriimonas ginsengisoli Im et al. 2012
  - - Armatimonas rosea Tamaki et al. 2011
    - Chthonomonas calidirosea Lee et al. 2011

Armatimonas rosea, an aerobic, Gram-negative, pink pigmented, nonmotile, ovoid/rod shaped bacterium, was isolated from the rhizoplane of an aquatic plant Phragmites australis in Japan. It is the first representative of the phylum Armatimonadota.

Fimbriimonas ginsengisoli, an aerobic, non-motile, mesophilic, rod-shaped bacterium, was isolated from a ginseng field soil sample. It represents the first cultured representative of the Fimbriimonadia class, corresponding with Group 4 of the phylum Armatimonadota.

In 2014 its genome was the first to be sequenced from Armatimonadetes

== Characteristics ==
When grown on solid medium AOM1, colonies were light-pink pigmented, circular, convex, relatively small (2–4 mm) in size after one week of incubation at 60 °C. Chthonomonas calidirosea has an optimum temperature at 68 °C with a range of 50–73 °C. The optimum pH for growth was 5.3 with a range of 4.5–5.8. Optimum growth was observed in NaCl free medium, although growth was observed in NaCl amended FSV1 medium up to 2% NaCl.

When examined by phase-contrast and transmission electron microscopy a limited number of cells were observed to exhibit a tumbling motility that was highly dependent on growth phase, medium pH and substrate. An irregular, corrugated outer membrane was consistently observed. Cells were rod shaped, with sizes ranging from 0.5–0.7 μm in diameter and 2.5–3.0 μm in length. Neither spores nor flagella were observed.

Cultures of C. calidirosea were observed to be aerobic, saccharolytic, obligately thermophilic, motile, non-spore-forming bacterium with no evidence of growth under anaerobic conditions.
