= A. shizuokensis =

A. shizuokensis may refer to:

- Aleyrodes shizuokensis, a species of whitefly.
- Alicyclobacillus shizuokensis, a Gram-positive bacterium.
