= Hesperidum =

Hesperidum may refer to:

- Alicyclobacillus hesperidum, species of bacteria
- Amitus hesperidum, species of wasp
- Coccus hesperidum, species of insect
