= Kyrpidia spormannii =

Scientific classification
- Domain: Bacteria
- Kingdom: Bacillati
- Phylum: Bacillota
- Class: Bacilli
- Order: Bacillales
- Family: Alicyclobacillaceae
- Genus: Kyrpidia
- Species: K. spormannii

Binomial name
- Kyrpidia spormannii Reiner et al 2018

Species of bacterium

Kyrpidia spormannii is a species of Gram positive, aerobic, thermophilic bacterium. The cells are rod-shaped and form spores. It was first isolated from sediment samples from hydrothermal systems collected in the Azores. The species is named in honor of German-American microbiologist Alfred M. Spormann, in recognition of his work on the field microbial electrosynthesis.

The optimum growth temperature for K. spormannii is 55 °C, and can grow in the 45-65 °C range. Its optimum pH is 5.5, and grows in pH range 4.5-7.0.
