= Kyrpidia =

Scientific classification
- Domain: Bacteria
- Kingdom: Bacillati
- Phylum: Bacillota
- Class: Bacilli
- Order: Bacillales
- Family: Alicyclobacillaceae
- Genus: Kyrpidia; Klenk et al 2010

Type species
- Kyrpidia tusciae Klenk et al 2010

Species
- K. spormannii; K. tusciae

Genus of bacteria

Kyrpidia is a genus of Gram-positive, rod-shaped, thermophilic, spore-forming bacteria.

Bacillus tusciae was first described in 1984, and had been isolated from a geothermal area in Tuscany, Italy. It was placed within the genus Bacillus at that time. Further work on the organism led to the creation of a new genus, Kyrpidia, in 2010. The genus was "named in honor of Nikolaos C. Kyrpides, a Greek-American genomics scientist, who co-initiated the Genomic Encyclopedia of Archaea and Bacteria." K. tusciae is the type species for the genus.

Both species of Kyrpidia have been isolated from areas of high volcanic activity in Tuscany and the Azores. The optimum temperature for growth for both members of the genus is approximately 55 °C.

== Phylogeny ==
The currently accepted taxonomy is based on the List of Prokaryotic names with Standing in Nomenclature (LPSN) and National Center for Biotechnology Information (NCBI)

16S rRNA based LTP_10_2024

- Kyrpidia
  - K. spormannii Reiner et al. 2018
  - K. tusciae Klenk et al. 2012

120 marker proteins based GTDB 09-RS220

- Kyrpidia
  - K. spormannii
  - K. tusciae

== See also ==
- List of bacterial orders
- List of bacteria genera
