= Fimbriimonas =

Scientific classification
- Domain: Bacteria
- Kingdom: Bacillati
- Phylum: Armatimonadota
- Class: Fimbriimonadia; Im et al. 2012
- Order: Fimbriimonadales; Im et al. 2012
- Family: Fimbriimonadaceae; Im et al. 2012
- Genus: Fimbriimonas; Im et al. 2012
- Species: F. ginsengisoli

Binomial name
- Fimbriimonas ginsengisoli Im et al. 2012

Species of bacterium

Fimbriimonas ginsengisoli is a Gram-negative bacterium and the first representative of the genus Fimbriimonas and class Fimbriimonadia within the phylum Armatimonadota. The Armatimonadota were previously known as candidate phylum OP10. OP10 was composed solely of environmental 16S rRNA gene clone sequences prior to F. ginsengisoli's relative, Armatimonas rosea's discovery.

== Discovery ==
Fimbriimonas ginsengisoli was originally isolated from a soil sample from a ginseng field in the Pocheon province, South Korea. Cultivation took place on one-half strength R2A agar.

== Relatives ==
The environmental 16S rRNA gene sequences, belonging to the phylum Armatimonadota are currently sorted into six groups. Groups 2, 5, and 6 consist solely of sequences. Group 1 contains Armatimonas rosea, Group 3 contains Chthonomonadetes calidirosea, and Group 4 contains Fimbriimonas ginsengisoli.

- - Fimbriimonas ginsengisoli Im et al. 2012
  - Armatimonas rosea Tamaki et al. 2011
  - Chthonomonas calidirosea Lee et al. 2011

Chthonomonas calidirosea strain T49T, an aerobic, saccharolytic, obligately thermophilic, motile, non-spore-forming bacterium, was isolated from geothermally heated soil at Hell's Gate, Tikitere, New Zealand. It is the first representative of a new class in the phylum Armatimonadota. It represents the first cultured representative of the Chthonomonadetes, corresponding with Group 3 of the phylum Armatimonadota.

Armatimonas rosea, an aerobic, Gram-negative, pink pigmented, nonmotile, ovoid/rod shaped bacterium, was isolated from the rhizoplane of an aquatic plant Phragmites australis in Japan. It is the first representative of the phylum Armatimonadota.

== Characteristics ==
When grown on one-half strength R2A, colonies were ivory pigmented, circular, raised, contained a greasy surface, highly mucoid, and relatively small (1–2 mm) in size after two weeks of incubation at 30 °C. F. ginsengisoli has an optimum temperature at 30 °C with a range of 15-30 °C. The optimum pH for growth was 7.0 with a range of 6.0-8.5. Supplementary NaCl was not needed for growth but concentrations up to 1% could be tolerated.

When examined by phase-contrast and transmission electron microscopy cells were observed to be nonmotile, rod shaped, with sizes ranging from 0.5 to 0.7 μm in width and 2.5-5.0 μm in length. F. ginsengisoli carried peritrichous fibrils, which were very fine and hairy and projected out from the cell wall. Spore formation was not observed.

When investigated in one-half R2A media, cultures of F. ginsengisoli were observed to be strictly aerobic with no evidence of growth under anaerobic conditions. It is negative for the oxidase test, but positive for the catalase test. It could not use most substrates tested as a sole carbon source but could use peptone, casamino acids or yeast extract as sole carbon sources. The strain did not degrade DNA, starch, xylan, or cellulose.
