= Capsulimonas =

Scientific classification
- Domain: Bacteria
- Kingdom: Bacillati
- Phylum: Armatimonadota
- Class: Armatimonadia
- Order: Capsulimonadales; Li et al. 2019
- Family: Capsulimonadaceae; Li et al. 2019
- Genus: Capsulimonas; Li et al. 2019
- Species: C. corticalis

Binomial name
- Capsulimonas corticalis Li et al. 2019

Genus of bacteria

Capsulimonas is a Gram-negative, non-spore-forming, aerobic and non-motile genus of bacteria from the family Capsulimonadaceae with one known species, Capsulimonas corticalis. Capsulimonas corticalis has been isolated from the surface of a beech (Fagus crenata)
