= Alicyclobacillus herbarius =

Scientific classification
- Domain: Bacteria
- Kingdom: Bacillati
- Phylum: Bacillota
- Class: Bacilli
- Order: Bacillales
- Family: Alicyclobacillaceae
- Genus: Alicyclobacillus
- Species: A. herbarius

Binomial name
- Alicyclobacillus herbarius Goto et al. 2002

Species of bacterium

Alicyclobacillus herbarius is a species of Gram positive, strictly aerobic, bacterium. The bacteria are acidophilic and produced endospores. It was first isolated from a hibiscus-based herbal tea. The species was first described in 2002, and the name refers to the herbal tea from which it was first isolated.

The optimum growth temperature for A. herbarius is 55-60 °C, and can grow in the 35-65 °C range. The optimum pH is 4.5-5.0, and can grow in pH 3.5-6.0.
