= Alicyclobacillus fodiniaquatilis =

Scientific classification
- Domain: Bacteria
- Kingdom: Bacillati
- Phylum: Bacillota
- Class: Bacilli
- Order: Bacillales
- Family: Alicyclobacillaceae
- Genus: Alicyclobacillus
- Species: A. fodiniaquatilis

Binomial name
- Alicyclobacillus fodiniaquatilis Zhang et al. 2015

Species of bacterium

Alicyclobacillus fodiniaquatilis is a species of Gram positive, strictly aerobic, bacterium. The bacteria are acidophilic and produced endospores. It was first isolated from acid mine water from a copper mine in Fujian Province, Republic of China. The species was first described in 2015, and the name is derived from Latin fodina (mine) and aqua water, referring to the original isolation location.

The optimum growth temperature for A. fodiniaquatilis is 40 °C, and can grow in the 20-45 °C range. The optimum pH is 3.5, and can grow in pH 2.5-5.5.
