= Alicyclobacillus dauci =

Scientific classification
- Domain: Bacteria
- Kingdom: Bacillati
- Phylum: Bacillota
- Class: Bacilli
- Order: Bacillales
- Family: Alicyclobacillaceae
- Genus: Alicyclobacillus
- Species: A. dauci

Binomial name
- Alicyclobacillus dauci Nakano et al. 2015

Species of bacterium

Alicyclobacillus dauci is a species of Gram positive, strictly aerobic, bacterium. The bacteria are acidophilic and produced endospores. It was first isolated from spoiled mixed vegetable and fruit juice. The species was first described in 2015, and the name is derived from the Latin dauci (of the carrot).

The optimum growth temperature for A. dauci is 40 °C, and can grow in the 20-50 °C range. The optimum pH is 4.0, and can grow in pH 3.0-6.0.
