= Alicyclobacillus =

Scientific classification
- Domain: Bacteria
- Kingdom: Bacillati
- Phylum: Bacillota
- Class: Bacilli
- Order: Bacillales
- Family: Alicyclobacillaceae
- Genus: Alicyclobacillus; Wisotzkey 1992

Type species
- Alicyclobacillus acidocaldarius (Darland & Brock 1971) Wisotzkey 1992

Species
- See text

Genus of bacteria

Alicyclobacillus is a genus of Gram-variable, rod-shaped, spore-forming bacteria. The bacteria are able to grow in acidic conditions, while the spores are able to survive typical pasteurization procedures.

== Overview ==
Alicyclobacilli are strictly aerobic, acidophilic, mesophilic to thermophilic, soil-dwelling organisms. Alicyclobacilli are of special interest to the fruit juice canning industry because common pasteurization techniques (92 °C for 10 seconds) do not deactivate the spores; Alicyclobacillus species can have a D_{95}-value of over 8 minutes (requiring treatment of over 8 minutes at 95 °C to kill 90% of spores). When a product is spoiled by Alicyclobacillus, the juice products develop a disinfectant-like odor and/or flavor (due to guaiacol production), but the bacteria do not cause swelling of the package or discoloration of the product, nor is it pathogenic to humans. Alicyclobacilli have been implicated in spoilages of pear, orange, peach, mango, and white grape juice, fruit juice blends, and tomato products. Not all Alicyclobacilli produce guaiacol, and thus not all species are of spoilage concern. A. consociatus and A. pohliae were originally classified in genus Alicyclobacillus, but were later reclassified into the novel genus Effusibacillus in 2014.

Most Alicyclobacillus species optimally grow in the 40-55 °C range. The exceptions include A. acidocaldarius (65 °C), A. aeris (30 °C), A. disulfidooxidans (35 °C), and A. ferrooxydans (28 °C). A. acidocaldarius is the most thermotolerant, as is able to grow in temperatures up to 70 °C. A. disulfidooxidans is the only psychrotroph, being able to grow at 4 °C. Most species can grow in the pH 2.0-6.0 range, and none have been shown to grow above pH 6.5. A. disulfidooxidans is the most acid-tolerant, and can grow at pH 0.5.

== Background ==
The first Alicyclobacillus species was isolated in 1967 from hot springs, and was named Bacillus acidocaldarius. However, it was not until 1982 that the organisms were implicated in the spoilage of apple juice. The next outbreak occurred in 1994, and based on 16S rRNA studies, a separate genus was proposed. The genus name derives from ω-alicyclic fatty acids as the major component in the cellular membrane, and to reflect the previous classification as Bacillus. A. acidoterrestris is considered the most important spoilage species within the genus Alicyclobacillus, but A. acidocaldarius, A. pomorum, and A. herbarius have also been isolated from spoiled product. Soil is a common habitat for species of Alicyclobacillus, and is likely the source for contamination of food products.

== Impact ==
The canning industry works under the assumption that bacterial spores will not germinate at pH values below 4.6, and that acid-tolerant organisms are not very heat resistant. In this case, a low heat pasteurization process is applicable. However, the emergence of Alicyclobacillus as a spoilage organism has led some researchers to advocate using A. acidoterrestris as the reference organism to design pasteurization processes for high acid foods, just as the thermal death time of Clostridium botulinum was used to design the sterilization process for low acid canned foods. High-pressure processing has been shown to be effective at inactivating A. acidoterrestris spores in orange juice. One survey of 8556 samples of fruit and vegetable juices found Alicyclobacillus in 13% of samples, while another study found Alicyclobacillus in 6% out of 180 samples, and another found the bacteria in 14% out of 75 samples.

In The Netherlands in 2013, contamination of raspberry with Alicyclobacillus in pasteurized juices led to a public recall after consumers complained about bad taste and odor.

== Phylogeny ==
The currently accepted taxonomy is based on the List of Prokaryotic names with Standing in Nomenclature (LPSN) and National Center for Biotechnology Information (NCBI)

16S rRNA based LTP_10_2024

- Alicyclobacillus
  - - - A. cycloheptanicus (Deinhard et al. 1988) Wisotzkey et al. 1992
      - - A. disulfidooxidans (Dufresne et al. 1996) Karavaiko et al. 2005
        - - A. tolerans Karavaiko et al. 2005
          - - A. montanus Lopez et al. 2018
            - A. tengchongensis Kim et al. 2016
    - - - A. herbarius Goto et al. 2002
        - - A. kakegawensis Goto et al. 2007
          - A. shizuokensis Goto et al. 2007
      - - - A. cellulosilyticus Kusube et al. 2014
          - A. macrosporangiidus Goto et al. 2007
        - - A. aeris Guo et al. 2009
          - - - A. contaminans Goto et al. 2007
              - A. pomorum Goto et al. 2003
            - - A. mengziensis Jiang et al. 2022
              - - A. curvatus Jiang et al. 2022
                - A. ferrooxydans Jiang et al. 2008
  - - - - A. vulcanalis Simbahan, Drijber & Blum 2004
        - A. acidocaldarius rittmannii Nicolaus et al. 2002
      - - - A. acidocaldarius (Darland & Brock 1971) Wisotzkey et al. 1992
          - "A. fructus" Roth et al. 2021
        - - A. mali Matsubara et al. 2002 ex Roth et al. 2021
          - A. sendaiensis Tsuruoka et al. 2003
    - - - A. hesperidum aegles Goto et al. 2023
        - - A. hesperidum Albuquerque et al. 2000
          - A. sacchari Goto et al. 2007
      - - A. acidiphilus Matsubara et al. 2002
        - - A. dauci Nakano et al. 2015
          - - A. fodiniaquatilis Zhang et al. 2015
            - - A. fastidiosus Goto et al. 2007
              - - A. acidoterrestris (Deinhard et al. 1988) Wisotzkey et al. 1992
                - "A. suci" Roth et al. 2021

120 marker proteins based GTDB 09-RS220

- Alicyclobacillus
  - - A. cellulosilyticus
    - - A. cycloheptanicus
      - - - A. herbarius
          - - A. kakegawensis
            - A. shizuokensis
        - - A. tolerans
          - - - A. macrosporangiidus
              - - A. contaminans
                - A. pomorum
            - - A. ferrooxydans
              - - A. curvatus
                - A. mengziensis
  - - A. tengchongensis
    - - - A. vulcanalis
        - - "A. fructus"
          - - A. mali
            - - A. acidocaldarius
              - A. sendaiensis
      - - - A. sacchari
          - A. hesperidum
        - - A. acidiphilus
          - - A. dauci
            - - A. fastidiosus
              - - A. acidoterrestris
                - "A. suci"

== See also ==
- List of bacterial orders
- List of bacteria genera
