= Alicyclobacillus acidoterrestris =

Scientific classification
- Domain: Bacteria
- Kingdom: Bacillati
- Phylum: Bacillota
- Class: Bacilli
- Order: Bacillales
- Family: Alicyclobacillaceae
- Genus: Alicyclobacillus
- Species: A. acidoterrestris

Binomial name
- Alicyclobacillus acidoterrestris Wisotzkey et al. 1992

Species of bacterium

Alicyclobacillus acidoterrestris is a species of Gram positive, strictly aerobic, bacterium. The bacteria are acidophilic and produce endospores. It was first isolated from soil. The species was originally classified as Bacillus acidoterrestris in 1987, but further 16S rRNA studies found that the species belonged in the newly created genus Alicyclobacillus. The species name is derived from the Latin acidum (acid) and terrestris (from the earth), referring to its acidophilic nature and that it was isolated from soil.

Alicyclobacillus acidoterrestris was among the first three species reclassified from the genus Bacillus to the newly created Alicyclobacillus in 1992, along with A. acidocaldarius and A. cycloheptanicus.

The optimum growth temperature for A. acidoterrestris is 42-53 °C, and can grow in the 35-55 °C range, and in pH 2.2-5.8.
