= Alicyclobacillus pomorum =

Scientific classification
- Domain: Bacteria
- Kingdom: Bacillati
- Phylum: Bacillota
- Class: Bacilli
- Order: Bacillales
- Family: Alicyclobacillaceae
- Genus: Alicyclobacillus
- Species: A. pomorum

Binomial name
- Alicyclobacillus pomorum Goto et al. 2003

Species of bacterium

Alicyclobacillus pomorum is a species of Gram positive, strictly aerobic, bacterium. The bacteria are acidophilic and produced endospores. It was first isolated from spoiled mixed fruit juice (containing fresh orange, apple, mango, pineapple, and raspberry juice). The species was first described in 2003, and the name is derived from Latin pomorum (of fruits).

The optimum growth temperature for A. pomorum is 45-50 °C, and can grow in the 30-60 °C range. The optimum pH is 4.5-5.0, and can grow in pH 3.0-6.0.
