= Alicyclobacillus shizuokensis =

Scientific classification
- Domain: Bacteria
- Kingdom: Bacillati
- Phylum: Bacillota
- Class: Bacilli
- Order: Bacillales
- Family: Alicyclobacillaceae
- Genus: Alicyclobacillus
- Species: A. shizuokensis

Binomial name
- Alicyclobacillus shizuokensis Goto et al. 2007

Species of bacterium

Alicyclobacillus shizuokensis is a species of Gram positive, strictly aerobic, bacterium. The bacteria are acidophilic and produce endospores. It was first isolated from soil in a crop field in Shizuoka, Japan. The species was first described in 2007, and the name refers to the city from which it was first isolated.

The optimum growth temperature for A. shizuokensis is 45-50 °C, and can grow in the 35-60 °C range. The optimum pH is 4.0-4.5, and cannot grow at pH 3.0 or pH 6.5.

A. shizuokensis was found during a Japanese survey of various beverages and environments, which also discovered 5 other species of Alicyclobacillus: A. contaminans, A. fastidiosus, A. kakegawensis, A. macrosporangiidus, and A. sacchari.
