= Alicyclobacillus tengchongensis =

Scientific classification
- Domain: Bacteria
- Kingdom: Bacillati
- Phylum: Bacillota
- Class: Bacilli
- Order: Bacillales
- Family: Alicyclobacillaceae
- Genus: Alicyclobacillus
- Species: A. tengchongensis

Binomial name
- Alicyclobacillus tengchongensis Kim et al. 2014

Species of bacterium

Alicyclobacillus tengchongensis is a species of Gram positive, strictly aerobic, bacterium. The bacteria are acidophilic and produced endospores. It was first isolated from soil in a hot spring in Tengchong, China. The species was first described in 2014, and the name refers to the city from which it was first isolated.

The optimum growth temperature for A. tengchongensis is 45 °C, and can grow in the 30-50 °C range. The optimum pH is 3.2, and can grow in pH 2.0-6.0.
