= Armatimonas =

Scientific classification
- Domain: Bacteria
- Kingdom: Bacillati
- Phylum: Armatimonadota
- Class: Armatimonadia
- Order: Armatimonadales; Tamaki et al. 2011
- Family: Armatimonadaceae; Tamaki et al. 2011
- Genus: Armatimonas; Tamaki et al. 2011
- Species: A. rosea

Binomial name
- Armatimonas rosea Tamaki et al. 2011

Species of bacterium

Armatimonas rosea is a Gram-negative bacterium and also the first species to be characterized within the phylum Armatimonadota. It is the only species in the genus Armatimonas. The Armatimonadota were previously known as candidate phylum OP10. OP10 was composed solely of environmental 16S rRNA gene clone sequences prior to A. rosea's discovery. A novel aerobic, chemoheterotrophic bacterium, strain YO-36(T), isolated from the rhizoplane of an aquatic plant (a reed, Phragmites australis) inhabiting a freshwater lake in Japan, was morphologically, physiologically and phylogenetically characterized.

== Discovery ==
Armatimonas rosea was originally isolated from the rhizoplane of the aquatic plant Phragmites australis inhabiting a freshwater lake in the Yamanashi prefecture in Japan. Cultivation and isolation were completed in a low nutrient medium, DTS.

== Relatives ==
The environmental 16S rRNA gene sequences belonging to the phylum Armatimonadota are currently sorted into six groups. Groups 2, 5, and 6 consist solely of sequences. Group 1 contains Armatimonas rosea, Group 3 contains Chthonomonadetes calidirosea, and Group 4 contains Fimbriimonas ginsengisoli.

- - Fimbriimonas ginsengisoli Im et al. 2012
  - Armatimonas rosea Tamaki et al. 2011
  - Chthonomonas calidirosea Lee et al. 2011

Chthonomonas calidirosea strain T49T, an aerobic, saccharolytic, obligately thermophilic, motile, non-spore-forming bacterium, was isolated from geothermally heated soil at Hell's Gate, Tikitere, New Zealand. It is the first representative of a new class in the phylum Armatimonadota. It represents the first cultured representative of the Chthonomonadetes, corresponding with Group 3 of the phylum Armatimonadota.

Fimbriimonas ginsengisoli, an aerobic, non-motile, mesophilic, rod-shaped bacterium, was isolated from a ginseng field soil sample. It represents the first cultured representative of the Fimbriimonadia class, corresponding with Group 4 of the phylum Armatimonadota.

== Characteristics ==
When grown on the relatively low-nutrient medium, R2A, colonies were pink pigmented, circular, smooth, significantly hard, relatively small (1–2 mm) in size after one week of incubation at 30 °C. A. rosea has an optimum temperature at 30–35 °C with a range of 20–40 °C. The optimum pH for growth was 6.5 with a range of 5.5–8.5. It is able to tolerate NaCl concentrations up to 0.5%.

When examined by phase-contrast and transmission electron microscopy cells were observed to be nonmotile, ovoid to rod shaped, with sizes ranging from 1.4 to 1.8 μm in width and 2.4–3.2 μm in length. Neither spores nor flagella were observed.

When investigated in R2A media, cultures of A. rosea were observed to be aerobic and chemoheterotrophic with no evidence of growth under anaerobic conditions. It is negative for the following tests: nitrate respiration, fermentative growth, catalase, and cytochrome oxidase.
