= Effusibacillus consociatus =

Scientific classification
- Domain: Bacteria
- Kingdom: Bacillati
- Phylum: Bacillota
- Class: Bacilli
- Order: Bacillales
- Family: Alicyclobacillaceae
- Genus: Effusibacillus
- Species: E. consociatus

Binomial name
- Effusibacillus consociatus Glaeser et al 2013

Species of bacterium

Effusibacillus consociatus is a species of Gram positive, aerobic, bacterium. The cells are rod-shaped and form spores. It was first isolated from a blood sample from a 51-year-old woman, although it was not implicated as a pathogen. The species name is derived from Latin consociatus (associated with), to indicate that the bacteria was associated with a human clinical case.

The species was originally grouped with genus Alicyclobacillus, as it was closely related to A. pohliae. However, further research found that both A. consociatus and A. pohliae belonged in a newly described genus Effusibacillus, and were renamed accordingly.

The optimum growth temperature for E. consociatus is 30 °C, and can grow in the 15-45 °C range. Its optimum pH is 6.5, and grows in pH range 5.5-10.5.
