= Effusibacillus =

Scientific classification
- Domain: Bacteria
- Kingdom: Bacillati
- Phylum: Bacillota
- Class: Bacilli
- Order: Bacillales
- Family: Alicyclobacillaceae
- Genus: Effusibacillus; Watanabe, Kojima & Fukui 2014

Type species
- Effusibacillus lacus Watanabe, Kojima & Fukui 2014

Species
- E. consociatus; E. dendaii; E. lacus; E. pohliae

Genus of bacteria

Effusibacillus is a genus of Gram-positive, rod-shaped, aerobic, spore-forming bacteria.

Effusibacillus was first proposed in 2014 after a strain of bacteria was isolated from the sediment of a freshwater lake. While genetically similar to other members of the family Alicyclobacillaceae, the strain was found to be distinct enough to require its own genus, and was named E. lacus. It was also found that two other previously described organisms in the genus Alicyclobacillus, A. consociatus and A. pohliae belonged in this new genus. The name is derived from Latin effusus (disorderly) and bacillus (small rod), which refers to the various lengths of the cells microscopically.

Members of this genus have been isolated from a lake in Japan, a lake in Antarctica, and from the blood of a woman (in a non-infectious capacity). E. lacus and E. pohliae are both thermophiles, with optimum growth temperatures above 50 °C, while the optimum growth temperature for E. consociatus is 30 °C.

== Phylogeny ==
The currently accepted taxonomy is based on the List of Prokaryotic names with Standing in Nomenclature (LPSN) and National Center for Biotechnology Information (NCBI)

16S rRNA based LTP_10_2024

- Effusibacillus
  - E. lacus Watanabe, Kojima & Fukui 2014
  - - E. dendaii Konishi et al. 2022
    - - E. consociatus (Glaeser et al. 2013) Watanabe, Kojima & Fukui 2014
      - E. pohliae (Imperio et al. 2008) Watanabe, Kojima & Fukui 2014

120 marker proteins based GTDB 09-RS220

- Effusibacillus
  - E. dendaii
  - - E. lacus
    - E. pohliae

== See also ==
- List of bacterial orders
- List of bacteria genera
