= Alicyclobacillus tolerans =

Scientific classification
- Domain: Bacteria
- Kingdom: Bacillati
- Phylum: Bacillota
- Class: Bacilli
- Order: Bacillales
- Family: Alicyclobacillaceae
- Genus: Alicyclobacillus
- Species: A. tolerans

Binomial name
- Alicyclobacillus tolerans Karavaiko et al. 2005

Species of bacterium

Alicyclobacillus tolerans is a species of Gram positive, strictly aerobic, bacterium. The bacteria are acidophilic and produced endospores. It was first isolated from oxidizable lead–zinc ores in Uzbekistan. The strain was first identified in 1983, but was classified as Sulfobacillus thermosulfidooxidans subsp. thermotolerans strain K1. It was reclassified as Alicyclobacillus in 2005. The species name refers to the ability to tolerate changes in temperature and pH.

A. tolerans was reclassified to Alicyclobacillus along with Sulfobacillus disulfidooxidans, which was classified as Alicyclobacillus disulfidooxidans.

The optimum growth temperature for A. tolerans is 37-42 °C, and can grow in the 20-50 °C range. The optimum pH is 2.5-2.7, and can grow in pH 1.5-5.0.
