= Effusibacillus pohliae =

Scientific classification
- Domain: Bacteria
- Kingdom: Bacillati
- Phylum: Bacillota
- Class: Bacilli
- Order: Bacillales
- Family: Alicyclobacillaceae
- Genus: Effusibacillus
- Species: E. pohliae

Binomial name
- Effusibacillus pohliae Imperio et al 2008

Species of bacterium

Effusibacillus pohliae is a species of Gram positive, aerobic, thermophilic bacterium. The cells are rod-shaped and form spores. It was first isolated from Mount Melbourne, Antarctica. The species is named after the genus of Pohlia nutans, a species of moss that was colonizing the area where the type strain was isolated. E. pohliae has also been isolated from a geothermal heat pump in South Korea.

The species was originally grouped with genus Alicyclobacillus. However, further research found that A. pohliae and Alicyclobacillus consociatus belonged in a newly described genus Effusibacillus, and were renamed accordingly.

The optimum growth temperature for E. pohliae is 55 °C, and can grow in the 42-60 °C range. Its optimum pH is 5.0, and grows in pH range 4.5-7.5.
