= Alicyclobacillus hesperidum =

Scientific classification
- Domain: Bacteria
- Kingdom: Bacillati
- Phylum: Bacillota
- Class: Bacilli
- Order: Bacillales
- Family: Alicyclobacillaceae
- Genus: Alicyclobacillus
- Species: A. hesperidum

Binomial name
- Alicyclobacillus hesperidum Albuquerque et al. 2000

Species of bacterium

Alicyclobacillus hesperidum is a species of Gram positive, strictly aerobic, bacterium. The bacteria are acidophilic and produced endospores. It was first isolated from solfataric soils in the Furnas, the Azores. The species was first described in 2000, and the name refers to the Hesperides, "mythological figures whom the Greeks believed to have lived at the Western edge of the Earth in a miraculous garden, which [the researchers] interpret as the Azores."

The optimum growth temperature for A. hesperidum is 50-53 °C, and can grow in the 35-60 °C range. The optimum pH is 3.5-4.0, and can grow in pH 2.5-5.5.
