= Armatimonadota =

Scientific classification
- Domain: Bacteria
- Kingdom: Bacillati
- Phylum: Armatimonadota; Tamaki et al. 2021

Classes
- Armatimonadia; Chthonomonadia; Fimbriimonadia; "Heboniibacteriia"; "Zipacnadia"

Synonyms
- Candidate division OP10; "Armatimonadetes" Tamaki et al. 2011; "Armatimonadaeota" Oren et al. 2015; "Armatimonadota" Whitman et al. 2018

Phylum of bacteria

Armatimonadota is a phylum of gram-negative bacteria.

== History ==
Armatimonadota was originally described solely on the basis of environmental 16S rRNA gene clone sequences, and was temporarily titled candidate phylum OP10. However, in 2011 a bacterial strain belonging to the phylum was isolated from an aquatic plant in Japan. The species was named Armatimonas rosea and was the first member of its phylum, genus, and species.

== Members ==
Armatimonas rosea, an aerobic chemoheterotrophic bacterium, strain YO-36T, was isolated from rhizoplane of an aquatic plant (a reed, Phragmites australis) inhabiting a freshwater lake in Japan.

Chthonomonas calidirosea, an aerobic, saccharolytic, obligately thermophilic, motile, non-spore-forming bacterium, strain T49(T), was isolated from geothermally heated soil at Hell's Gate, Tikitere, New Zealand.

== Phylogeny ==
16S rRNA based LTP_10_2024

- Armatimonadota
  - - Abditibacteriia
      Abditibacterium utsteinense
  - - - Fimbriimonadia
        Fimbriimonas ginsengisoli
    - - Chthonomonadia
        Chthonomonas calidirosea
      - Armatimonadia
        - Armatimonas rosea
        - Capsulimonas corticalis

120 marker proteins based GTDB 10-RS226

- Armatimonadota
  - - - "Heboniibacteriia"
        - "Heboniibacterales"
          - "Heboniibacteraceae"
            "Ca. Heboniibacterum abditum"
    - - - UBA5829
          - UBA5829
            - UBA5829
              "Ca. Hippobium faecium"
      - - - Fimbriimonadia
            - Fimbriimonadales
              - Fimbriimonadaceae
                - Fimbriimonas ginsengisoli
                - "Ca. Nitrosymbiomonas proteolytica"
        - - Chthonomonadia
            - Chthonomonadales
              - Chthonomonadaceae
                Chthonomonas calidirosea
          - Armatimonadia
            - Armatimonadales
              - Armatimonadaceae
                Armatimonas rosea
              - Capsulimonadaceae
                Capsulimonas corticalis
  - - - "Zipacnadia"
        - "Zipacnadales"
          - "Zipacnadaceae"
            "Ca. Zipacnadum vermilionense"
    - - Abditibacteriia
        - Abditibacteriales
          - Abditibacteriaceae
            Abditibacterium utsteinense
      - "Fervidibacteria" "Fervidibacterales"
        - DRYI01
          - "Ca. Thermosaccharophagus"
            - "Ca. T. gerlachensis"
            - "Ca. T. yellowstonensis"
        - "Fervidibacteraceae"
          - "Ca. Caldisaccharidevorator"
            - "Ca. C. malaysiensis"
            - "Ca. C. sinensis"
          - "Fervidibacter"
            - - "Ca. F. canadensis"
              - "Ca. F. japonicus"
            - - "F. antarcticus"
              - "F. sacchari"

== Taxonomy ==
The currently accepted taxonomy is based on the List of Prokaryotic names with Standing in Nomenclature (LPSN) and National Center for Biotechnology Information (NCBI).

- Class "Zipacnadia" Carlton et al. 2023
  - Order "Zipacnadales" Carlton et al. 2023
    - Family "Zipacnadaceae" Carlton et al. 2023
      - Genus "Candidatus Zipacnadum" Carlton et al. 2023
        - Species "Ca. Z. vermilionense" Carlton et al. 2023
- Class "Heboniibacteriia" corrig. Carlton et al. 2023
  - Order "Heboniibacterales" corrig. Carlton et al. 2023
    - Family "Heboniibacteraceae" corrig. Carlton et al. 2023
      - Genus "Candidatus Heboniibacterum" corrig. Carlton et al. 2023
        - Species "Ca. H. abditum" corrig. Carlton et al. 2023
- Class UBA5829
  - Order UBA5829
    - Family UBA5829
      - Genus "Candidatus Hippobium" Gilroy et al. 2022
        - Species "Ca. H. faecium" Gilroy et al. 2022
- Class Fimbriimonadia Im et al. 2012
  - Order Fimbriimonadales Im et al. 2012
    - Family Fimbriimonadaceae Im et al. 2012
      - Genus Fimbriimonas Im et al. 2012
        - Species F. ginsengisoli Im et al. 2012
      - Genus "Candidatus Nitrosymbiomonas" Okubo et al. 2021
        - Species "Ca. N. proteolyticus" Okubo et al. 2021
- Class Chthonomonadia corrig. Lee et al. 2011
  - Order Chthonomonadales Lee et al. 2011
    - Family Chthonomonadaceae Lee et al. 2011
      - Genus Chthonomonas Lee et al. 2011
        - Species C. calidirosea Lee et al. 2011
- Class Armatimonadia Tamaki et al. 2011
  - Order Armatimonadales Tamaki et al. 2011
    - Family Armatimonadaceae Tamaki et al. 2011
      - Genus Armatimonas Tamaki et al. 2011
        - Species A. rosea Tamaki et al. 2011
  - Order Capsulimonadales Li, Kudo & Tonouchi 2018
    - Family Capsulimonadaceae Li, Kudo & Tonouchi 2018
      - Genus Capsulimonas Li, Kudo & Tonouchi 2018
        - Species C. corticalis Li, Kudo & Tonouchi 2018

== Notes ==
- List of Bacteria genera
- List of bacterial orders
