= Aseptic sampling =

Aseptic sampling is the process of aseptically withdrawing materials used in biopharmaceutical processes for analysis so as not contaminate or alter the sample or the source of the sample. Aseptic samples are drawn throughout the entire biopharmaceutical process (cell culture/fermentation, buffer and media prep, purification, final fill and finish). Analysis of the sample includes sterility, cell count/cell viability, metabolites, gases, osmolality and more.

== Aseptic sampling techniques ==
Biopharmaceutical drug manufacturers widely use aseptic sampling devices to enhance aseptic technique. The latest innovations of sampling devices harmonize with emerging trends in disposability, enhance operating efficiencies and improve operator safety.

=== Turn-key aseptic sampling devices ===
Turn-key Aseptic Sampling Devices are ready-to-use sampling devices that require little or no equipment preparation by the users. Turn-key devices help managers reduce labor costs, estimated to represent 75% to 80% of the cost of running a biotech facility.

Turn-key aseptic sampling devices include:

1. A means to connect the device to the bioprocess equipment
2. A mechanism to aseptically access the materials held in the biopress equipment
3. A means to aseptically transfer the sample out of the bioprocess equipment
4. A vessel or container to aseptically collect the sample
5. A mechanism to aseptically disconnect the collection vessel

To protect the integrity of the sample and to ensure it is truly representative of the time the sample is taken, the sampling pathway should be fully contained and independent of other sampling pathways.

==== Cannula(needle) based aseptic sampling devices ====
In a cannula-based aseptic sampling system, a needle penetrates an elastomeric septum. The septum is in direct contact with the liquid so that the liquid flows out of the equipment through the needle. Iterations of this technique are used in medical device industries but don't usually include equipment combining the needle and the septum. Introducing a potentially non-sterile needle into the bioprocessing equipment violates good aseptic technique. With a cannula based aseptic sampling device the needle and septa are combined into a hermetically sealed aseptic sampling device.
