= Alicyclobacillus disulfidooxidans =

Scientific classification
- Domain: Bacteria
- Kingdom: Bacillati
- Phylum: Bacillota
- Class: Bacilli
- Order: Bacillales
- Family: Alicyclobacillaceae
- Genus: Alicyclobacillus
- Species: A. disulfidooxidans

Binomial name
- Alicyclobacillus disulfidooxidans Karavaiko et al. 2005

Species of bacterium

Alicyclobacillus disulfidooxidans (formerly Sulfobacillus disulfidooxidansis) a species of Gram positive, strictly aerobic, bacterium. The bacteria are acidophilic and produced endospores. It was first isolated from wastewater sludge in Blake Lake City, Quebec, Canada. The species was first identified in 1996, but was classified as Sulfobacillus disulfidooxidansis. It was reclassified as Alicyclobacillus in 2005. The name is derived from the Latin duplus (double), sulfur (sulfur), and oxido (oxidize), referring to the bacterium's ability to oxidize disulfide.

A. disulfidooxidans was reclassified to Alicyclobacillus along with a strain of Sulfobacillus thermosulfidooxidans subsp. thermotolerans, which was classified as Alicyclobacillus tolerans.

The optimum growth temperature for A. disulfidooxidans is 35 °C, and can grow in the 4-40 °C range. The optimum pH is 1.5-2.5, and can grow in pH 0.5-6.0.
