= Sodium pyruvate =

Chemical compound

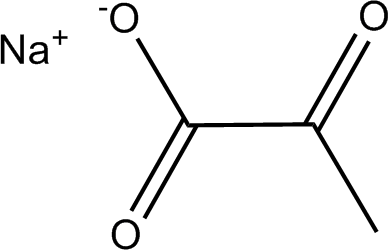

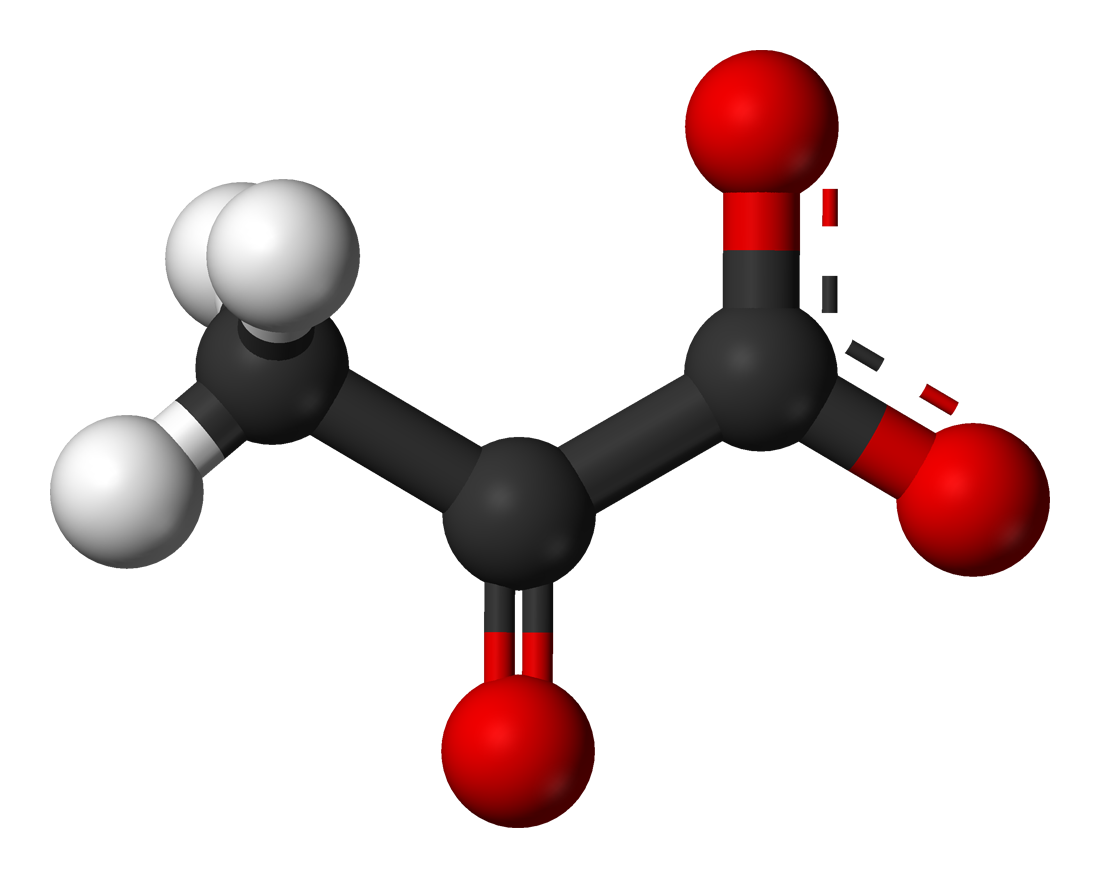
Ball-and-stick model of the pyruvate anion
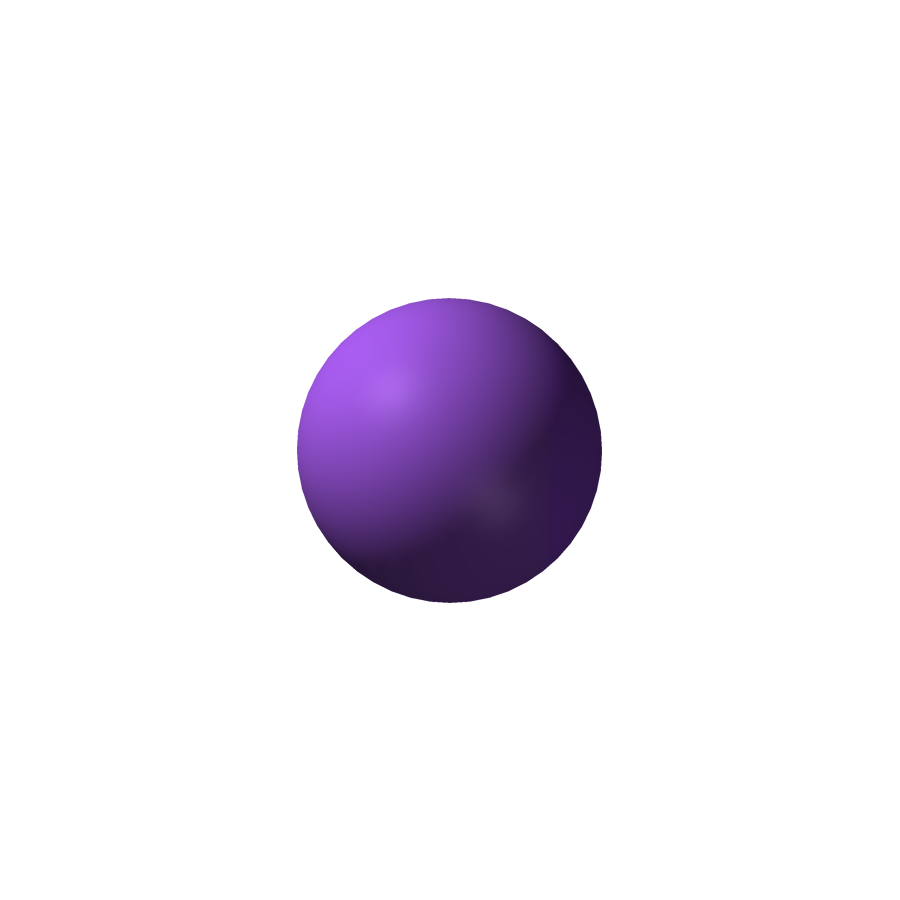
The sodium cation

Names
- Preferred IUPAC name Sodium 2-oxopropanoate
- Other names: α-Ketopropionic acid sodium salt; 2-Oxopropanoic acid sodium salt; Pyruvic acid sodium salt

Identifiers
CAS Number	113-24-6
3D model (JSmol)	Interactive image
ChEBI	CHEBI:50144
ChEMBL	ChEMBL181886
ChemSpider	7931
ECHA InfoCard	100.003.659
PubChem CID	23662274
UNII	POD38AIF08
CompTox Dashboard (EPA)	DTXSID6040614
- InChI: InChI=1S/C3H4O3.Na/c1-2(4)3(5)6;/h1H3,(H,5,6);/q;+1/p-1 Key: DAEPDZWVDSPTHF-UHFFFAOYSA-M; InChI=1/C3H4O3.Na/c1-2(4)3(5)6;/h1H3,(H,5,6);/q;+1/p-1 Key: DAEPDZWVDSPTHF-REWHXWOFAL
- SMILES: [Na+].[O-]C(=O)C(=O)C

Properties
Chemical formula	C_{3}H_{3}NaO_{3}
Molar mass	110.044 g·mol^{−1}
- Except where otherwise noted, data are given for materials in their standard state (at 25 °C [77 °F], 100 kPa). verify (what is ?) Infobox references

Sodium pyruvate is a salt of the conjugate anion form of pyruvic acid, known as pyruvate. It is commonly added to cell culture media as an additional source of energy, but may also have protective effects against hydrogen peroxide. This was reported by Giandomenico et al. and has been confirmed by several independent groups.

Due to pyruvate being an intermediate in many pathways for metabolism including glycolysis, sodium pyruvate has been used in many experiments involving cell cultures to provide more energy. In adipocytes it was found that sodium pyruvate promoted increased uptake of insulin-mediated glucose. In the body, one way in which sodium pyruvate provides energy to cells is through pyruvate conversion to acetyl-CoA which then can enter the TCA cycle which produces energy and is linked to other energy producing processes.

Along with having antioxidant properties and energy producing effects, sodium pyruvate has the ability to cross the blood-brain barrier and is used in several studies on brain injury because of these characteristics.
