= R2A agar =

Bacterial culture medium

R2A agar (Reasoner's 2A agar) is a culture medium developed to study bacteria which normally inhabit potable water. These bacteria tend to be slow-growing species and would quickly be suppressed by faster-growing species on a richer culture medium.

Since its development in 1985, it has been found to allow the culturing of many other bacteria that will not readily grow on fuller, complex organic media.

== Typical composition (% w/v) ==
- Proteose peptone, 0.05%
- Casamino acids, 0.05%
- Yeast extract, 0.05%
- Dextrose, 0.05%
- Soluble starch, 0.05%
- Dipotassium phosphate, 0.03%
- Magnesium sulfate, 0.005%
- Sodium pyruvate, 0.03%
- Agar, 1.5%

Final pH 7.2 ± 0.2 @ 25 °C
