= Alicyclobacillaceae =

Scientific classification
- Domain: Bacteria
- Kingdom: Bacillati
- Phylum: Bacillota
- Class: Bacilli
- Order: Bacillales
- Family: Alicyclobacillaceae da Costa & Rainey, 2009

Genera
- Alicyclobacillus; Collibacillus; Effusibacillus; Ferroacidibacillus; "Fodinisporobacter"; Kyrpidia; Sulfoacidibacillus; Tumebacillus

Family of bacteria

The Alicyclobacillaceae are a family of Gram-positive bacteria. All members of this family are aerobic and form endospores.

The family contains four genera: Alicyclobacillus, Effusibacillus, Kyrpidia, and Tumebacillus. When originally created in 2009, Alicyclobacillaceae was a monophyletic family, only including genus Alicyclobacillus. In 2011, the novel genus Kyrpidia was proposed and placed in family Alicyclobacillaceae, and Tumebacillus was placed into the family as well. In 2014, the novel genus Effusibacillus was proposed and added as the fourth member of Alicyclobacillaceae.

Alicyclobacillus is the largest genus in Alicyclobacillaceae, with over 20 validly published species. The species are all acidophilic and have thermally resistant endospores. Many species are common soil organisms. Certain Alicyclobacillus species (especially A. acidoterrestris) have been implicated in spoilage of pasteurized fruit juice.

Effusibacillus contains three species (as of 2019). Members of this genus have been isolated from a lake in Japan, a lake in Antarctica, and from the blood of a woman. E. lacus and E. pohliae are both thermophiles, with optimum growth temperatures above 50 °C, while the optimum growth temperature for E. consociatus is 30 °C.

Kyrpidia contains two species (as of 2019). Both species of Kyrpidia have been isolated from areas of high volcanic activity in Tuscany, Italy, and the Azores. The optimum temperature for growth for both members of the genus is approximately 55 °C.

Tumebacillus contains 8 species. Members of this genus have been isolated from arctic permafrost, soil samples, cassava wastewater, decomposing algal scum, river water, and the gut of a vulture. Tumebacillus was found during surveys of nasal airways of infants, an underground subway in Norway, and a mountain observatory in Austria.

No member of Alicyclobacillaceae has been found to be infectious. Effusibacillus consociatus was isolated from human blood and Tumebacillus was found during a survey of nasal airways of infants, but in neither instance were the bacteria found to be the cause of infection.

== Phylogeny ==
The currently accepted taxonomy is based on the List of Prokaryotic names with Standing in Nomenclature (LPSN) and National Center for Biotechnology Information (NCBI)

16S rRNA based LTP_10_2024

- Alicyclobacillaceae
  - - Effusibacillus Watanabe, Kojima & Fukui 2014
    - - Collibacillus Jojima et al. 2023
      - Tumebacillus Steven et al. 2008
  - - Kyrpidia Klenk et al. 2012
    - - - Ferroacidibacillus Johnson et al. 2023
        - Sulfoacidibacillus Johnson et al. 2023
      - Alicyclobacillus Wisotzkey et al. 1992

120 marker proteins based GTDB 09-RS220

- - - Kyrpidiales
      - Kyrpidiaceae
        Kyrpidia
  - - Tumebacillales
      - - BOQE01
          Collibacillus
        - Effusibacillaceae
          Effusibacillus
      - - Tumebacillaceae
          Tumebacillus
    - Alicyclobacillales
      - Sulfoacidibacillaceae
        - Ferroacidibacillus
        - Sulfoacidibacillus
      - Alicyclobacillaceae
        Alicyclobacillus

== See also ==
- List of bacterial orders
- List of bacteria genera
