= Oceanobacillus =

Scientific classification
- Domain: Bacteria
- Kingdom: Bacillati
- Phylum: Bacillota
- Class: Bacilli
- Order: Bacillales
- Family: Amphibacillaceae
- Genus: Oceanobacillus; Lu et al., 2002

Type species
- Oceanobacillus iheyensis Lu, Nogi & Takami 2002

Synonyms
- Compostibacillus Yu et al. 2015

Genus of bacteria

Oceanobacillus is a Gram-positive, rod-shaped and motile bacteria genus from the family of Bacillaceae with a peritrichous flagella. Oceanobacillus species are commonly found in saline environment.

== Characteristics of Oceanobacillus spp. ==
S.I. Paul et al. (2021) isolated and characterized four species of the genus Oceanobacillus from marine sponges of the Saint Martin's Island Area of the Bay of Bengal, Bangladesh. Colony, morphological, physiological, and biochemical characteristics of Oceanobacillus spp. are shown in the Table below.

Test type	Test	Characteristics
Colony characters	Size	Small/Medium
Colony characters	Type	Round
Colony characters	Color	Creamy
Colony characters	Shape	Convex
Morphological characters	Shape	Rod
Physiological characters	Motility	+
Physiological characters	Growth at 6.5% NaCl	+
Biochemical characters	Gram's staining	+
Biochemical characters	Oxidase	+
Biochemical characters	Catalase	+
Biochemical characters	Oxidative-Fermentative	O/F
Biochemical characters	Motility	+
Biochemical characters	Methyl Red	–
Biochemical characters	Voges-Proskauer	–
Biochemical characters	Indole	–
Biochemical characters	H_{2}S Production	–
Biochemical characters	Urease	–
Biochemical characters	Nitrate reductase	+/–
Biochemical characters	β-Galactosidase	+/–
Hydrolysis of	Gelatin	+/–
Hydrolysis of	Aesculin	+/–
Hydrolysis of	Casein	+/–
Hydrolysis of	Tween 40	+
Hydrolysis of	Tween 60	+
Hydrolysis of	Tween 80	+/–
Acid production from	Glycerol	+/–
Acid production from	Galactose	+/–
Acid production from	D-Glucose	+
Acid production from	D-Fructose	+
Acid production from	D-Mannose	+
Acid production from	Mannitol	+/–
Acid production from	N-Acetylglucosamine	+
Acid production from	Amygdalin	+/–
Acid production from	Maltose	+
Acid production from	D-Melibiose	+/–
Acid production from	D-Trehalose	+
Acid production from	Glycogen	+/–
Acid production from	D-Turanose	+

Note: + = Positive, – =Negative, O = Oxidative, F = Fermentative

== Phylogeny ==
The currently accepted taxonomy is based on the List of Prokaryotic names with Standing in Nomenclature (LPSN) and National Center for Biotechnology Information (NCBI).

16S rRNA based LTP_10_2024

- - - - Virgibacillus halodenitrificans
      - - Oceanobacillus~1
          - Oceanobacillus kapialis Namwong et al. 2009
          - Oceanobacillus picturae (Heyrman et al. 2003) Lee et al. 2006
    - Virgibacillus
  - - - Virgibacillus~3
      - - Virgibacillus~4
        - - - Oceanobacillus~2
              - Oceanobacillus alkalisoli Jin et al. 2022
              - Oceanobacillus indicireducens Hirota et al. 2013
          - - - Oceanobacillus~3
                - Oceanobacillus chironomi Raats & Halpern 2007
                - Oceanobacillus luteolus Wu et al. 2014
            - - Oceanobacillus pacificus Yu et al. 2014
              - - Ornithinibacillus heyuanensis
                - Lentibacillus daqui
    - - - - Ornithinibacillus salinisoli
          - - Ornithinibacillus caprae
            - Oceanobacillus limi Amoozegar et al. 2014
        - Ornithinibacillus~
      - - Oceanobacillus
          - - - O. polygoni Hirota et al. 2013
              - O. profundus Kim et al. 2007
            - - - O. longus Amoozegar et al. 2016
                - O. rekensis Long et al. 2015
              - - O. damuensis Long et al. 2015
                - O. endoradicis Yang et al. 2021
          - - - - O. bengalensis Yongchang, Xiang &Wang 2016
                - O. piezotolerans Yu et al. 2019
              - - O. caeni Nam, Bae & Lee 2008
                - - O. chungangensis Lee et al. 2013
                  - - O. arenosus Kim et al. 2015
                    - O. zhaokaii Zhu et al. 2020
            - - - O. halophilus Amoozegar et al. 2016 non Tang et al. 2014
                - O. salinisoli Zhu et al. 2021
              - - - O. iheyensis Lu, Nogi & Takami 2002
                  - O. kimchii Whon et al. 2011
                - - - O. neutriphilus Yang et al. 2010
                    - O. sojae corrig. Tominaga et al. 2009
                  - - O. locisalsi Lee et al. 2010
                    - O. oncorhynchi Yumoto et al. 2005

120 marker proteins based GTDB 09-RS220

- Oceanobacillus halotolerans Zhu et al. 2021

- Oceanobacillus
  - - - O. arenosus
      - - O. chungangensis
        - O. zhaokaii
    - - - O. bengalensis
        - O. piezotolerans
      - - Compostibacillus humi Yu et al. 2015
        - - "O. senegalensis" Senghor et al. 2017
          - - O. halophilus
            - - O. caeni
              - O. salinisoli
  - - - O. luteolus
      - - O. alkalisoli
        - O. indicireducens
    - - - - O. polygoni
          - O. profundus
        - - "O. massiliensis" Lagier et al. 2012 ex Roux et al. 2013
          - - O. rekensis
            - - O. damuensis
              - "O. saliphilus" Ou Yang et al. 2022
      - - - O. iheyensis
          - O. kimchii
        - - - O. neutriphilus
            - O. sojae
          - - "O. timonensis" Senghor et al. 2017
            - - "O. jeddahense" Khelaifia et al. 2016
              - O. oncorhynchi

Unassigned species:

- "O. aidingensis" Liu & Yang 2014
- "O. cibarius" Roh 2007q
- "O. gochujangensis" Jang et al. 2014
- "O. halophilum" Tang et al. 2014 non Amoozegar et al. 2016
- "O. sediminis" Zhao et al. 2022

== See also ==
- List of Bacteria genera
- List of bacterial orders
