= Virgibacillus =

Scientific classification
- Domain: Bacteria
- Kingdom: Bacillati
- Phylum: Bacillota
- Class: Bacilli
- Order: Bacillales
- Family: Bacillaceae
- Genus: Virgibacillus; Heyndrickx et al. 1998

Type species
- Virgibacillus pantothenticus (Proom & Knight 1950) Heyndrickx et al. 1998

Species
- See text

Synonyms
- Agaribacter Teramoto & Nishijima 2014; Salibacillus Wainø et al. 1999

Genus of bacteria

Virgibacillus is a genus of Gram-positive, rod-shaped (bacillus) bacteria and a member of the phylum Bacillota. Virgibacillus species can be obligate aerobes (oxygen reliant), or facultative anaerobes and catalase enzyme positive. Under stressful environmental conditions, the bacteria can produce oval or ellipsoidal endospores in terminal, or sometimes subterminal, swollen sporangia. The genus was recently reclassified from the genus Bacillus in 1998 following an analysis of the species V. pantothenticus. Subsequently, a number of new species have been discovered or reclassified as Virgibacillus species.

== Phylogeny ==
The currently accepted taxonomy is based on the List of Prokaryotic names with Standing in Nomenclature (LPSN) and National Center for Biotechnology Information (NCBI).

16S rRNA based LTP_10_2024

- - - - Sinibacillus
      - Pseudogracilibacillus
    - - - Ornithinibacillus gellani
        - - Cerasibacillus
          - - Tigheibacillus halophilus (An et al. 2007) Miliotis et al. 2024
            - Virgibacillus soli Kämpfer et al. 2011
      - - - Virgibacillus~2
            - - V. kekensis Chen et al. 2008
              - - V. litoralis Chen et al. 2012
                - - V. salinus Carrasco, Marquez & Ventosa 2009
                  - V. subterraneus Wang, Xue & Ma 2010
            - - V. oceani Yin et al. 2015
              - - V. byunsanensis Yoon et al. 2010
                - - V. flavescens Zhang et al. 2016
                  - - V. arcticus Niederberger et al. 2009
                    - - V. phasianinus Tak et al. 2018
                      - - V. carmonensis Heyrman et al. 2003
                        - V. necropolis Heyrman et al. 2003
        - - - Oceanobacillus halotolerans
            - Lentibacillus saliphilus
          - - Lentibacillus~
            - - - Virgibacillus siamensis Tanasupawat et al. 2011
                - Lentibacillus sediminis
              - Lentibacillus
  - - - - Virgibacillus halodenitrificans (Denariaz, Payne & Le Gall 1989) Yoon, Oh & Park 2004
        - - Oceanobacillus~1
            - Oceanobacillus kapialis Namwong et al. 2009
            - Oceanobacillus picturae (Heyrman et al. 2003) Lee et al. 2006
      - - Virgibacillus
          - - V. pantothenticus
            - - V. chiguensis
              - V. dokdonensis
          - - V. proomii
            - - - V. salexigens
                - - V. massiliensis Khelaifia et al. 2023
                  - V. kapii Daroonpunt et al. 2016
              - - - V. kimchii Oh et al. 2021
                  - - V. sediminis
                    - V. xinjiangensis
                - - V. marismortui (Arahal et al. 1999) Heyrman et al. 2003
                  - - V. olivae Quesada et al. 2007
                    - V. salarius Hua et al. 2008
    - - - - Virgibacillus~3
            - V. halotolerans Seiler & Wenning 2013
            - - - V. jeotgali Sundararaman et al. 2017
                - V. natechei Amziane et al. 2016
              - - V. alimentarius Kim et al. 2011
                - V. campisalis Lee et al. 2012
        - - - Virgibacillus~4
              - V. indicus Xu et al. 2018
              - V. profundi Xu et al. 2018
          - other
      - other

120 marker proteins based GTDB 09-RS220

- - Virgibacillus alimentarius [incl. Virgibacillus campisalis]
  - - - - Lentibacillus_C
        - - Virgibacillus_E & F
            - - "Virgibacillus ndiopensis" Francis et al. 2019
              - Virgibacillus oceani
            - - Virgibacillus phasianinus
              - Virgibacillus necropolis
      - - Oceanobacillus halotolerans
        - Lentibacillus [incl. "Virgibacillus ihumii", Virgibacillus siamensis,
          "Virgibacillus doumboii", Virgibacillus litoralis, Virgibacillus subterraneus]
    - - - - Ornithinibacillus gellani
          - Cerasibacillus
        - Ornithinibacillus
      - - - Virgibacillus
            - - - V. indicus
                - V. profundi
              - - V. halotolerans
                - - V. natechei
                  - Lentibacillus sediminis
            - - - V. halodenitrificans
                - - "Oceanobacillus manasiensis"
                  - Oceanobacillus jordanicus
              - - V. salarius
                - - V. salexigens
                  - - V. proomii
                    - - V. pantothenticus
                      - - V. chiguensis
                        - V. dokdonensis
        - other
