= Lentibacillus =

Scientific classification
- Domain: Bacteria
- Kingdom: Bacillati
- Phylum: Bacillota
- Class: Bacilli
- Order: Bacillales
- Family: Bacillaceae
- Genus: Lentibacillus; Yoon et al. 2002

Type species
- Lentibacillus salicampi Yoon, Kang & Park 2002

Species
- See text

Genus of bacteria

Lentibacillus is a Gram-variable bacterial genus from the family of Bacillaceae.

== Phylogeny ==
The currently accepted taxonomy is based on the List of Prokaryotic names with Standing in Nomenclature (LPSN) and National Center for Biotechnology Information (NCBI).

16S rRNA based LTP_10_2024

- - - Oceanobacillus halotolerans
    - Lentibacillus saliphilus Wang et al. 2021
  - - - Lentibacillus~
        - Lentibacillus populi Sun et al. 2016
        - Lentibacillus garicola Jung et al. 2015
    - - - Virgibacillus siamensis
        - Lentibacillus sediminis Guo et al. 2017
      - - Lentibacillus
          - - L. cibarius Oh et al. 2021
            - - L. halophilus Tanasupawat et al. 2006
              - - L. juripiscarius Namwong et al. 2005
                - L. lipolyticus Booncharoen et al. 2019
          - - - L. lacisalsi Lim et al. 2005
              - L. salis Lee et al. 2008
            - - - - L. kimchii Oh et al. 2016
                  - L. salinarum Lee et al. 2008
                - - L. halodurans
                  - L. salarius Jeon et al. 2005
              - - - L. jeotgali Jung et al. 2010
                  - L. kapialis Pakdeeto et al. 2007
                - - L. persicus Sánchez-Porro et al. 2010
                  - - L. amyloliquefaciens Wang et al. 2016
                    - L. salicampi Yoon, Kang & Park 2002

120 marker proteins based GTDB 09-RS220

- - - "Ca. Avamphibacillus"
    - Lentibacillus saliphilus
  - - Virgibacillus alimentarius
    - - - - Virgibacillus_E & F
          - - Lentibacillus_C
              - Lentibacillus daqui Liang et al. 2023
              - Lentibacillus populi
        - - Oceanobacillus halotolerans
          - - Lentibacillus
              - - - "Virgibacillus ihumii" Camara et al. 2020
                  - Virgibacillus siamensis Tanasupawat et al. 2011
                - - "Virgibacillus doumboii" Konate et al. 2021
                  - - Virgibacillus litoralis Chen et al. 2012
                    - Virgibacillus subterraneus Wang, Xue & Ma 2010
              - - - L. cibarius [incl. L. panjinensis Li et al. 2020]
                  - - L. juripiscarius
                    - L. lipolyticus
                - - - L. salicampi
                    - - L. jeotgali
                      - L. kapialis
                  - - L. halodurans
                    - - L. amyloliquefaciens
                      - L. persicus
      - other

Unassigned species:

- "L. alimentarius" Sundararaman et al. 2018
- "L. massiliensis" Senghor et al. 2017

== See also ==
- List of Bacteria genera
- List of bacterial orders
