= Alimentarius =

Alimentarius may refer to:

== Species ==
- Jeotgalibacillus alimentarius, species of bacteria
- Lentibacillus alimentarius, species of bacteria
- Psychrobacter alimentarius, species of bacteria
- Virgibacillus alimentarius, species of bacteria

== Other uses ==
- Codex Alimentarius, collection of internationally recognized standards relating to foods
- Codex Alimentarius Austriacus, collection of standards for a variety of foods
