= Virgibacillus soli =

Scientific classification
- Domain: Bacteria
- Kingdom: Bacillati
- Phylum: Bacillota
- Class: Bacilli
- Order: Bacillales
- Family: Bacillaceae
- Genus: Virgibacillus
- Species: V. soli

Binomial name
- Virgibacillus soli Kämpfer et al. 2011

Species of bacteria

Virgibacillus soli is a species of Gram-positive bacteria. A strain of this species was originally isolated from soil on a mountain in Taiwan. It is closely related to the species Virgibacillus halophilus and Virgibacillus kekensis.
