= Ornithinibacillus =

Scientific classification
- Domain: Bacteria
- Kingdom: Bacillati
- Phylum: Bacillota
- Class: Bacilli
- Order: Bacillales
- Family: Bacillaceae
- Genus: Ornithinibacillus; Mayr et al. 2006

Type species
- Ornithinibacillus bavariensis Mayr et al. 2006

Species
- See text

Synonyms
- Paucisalibacillus Nunes et al. 2006

Genus of bacteria

Ornithinibacillus is a Gram-positive and strictly aerobic genus of bacteria from the family of Bacillaceae.

== Phylogeny ==
The currently accepted taxonomy is based on the List of Prokaryotic names with Standing in Nomenclature (LPSN) and National Center for Biotechnology Information (NCBI).

16S rRNA based LTP_10_2024

- Ornithinibacillus gellani Qu et al. 2019

- Ornithinibacillus heyuanensis Wu et al. 2014

- Ornithinibacillus
  - - O. salinisoli Gan et al. 2018
    - - O. caprae Li et al. 2021
      - Oceanobacillus limi
  - - O. halophilus Bagheri et al. 2013
    - - - O. californiensis Mayr et al. 2006
        - O. halotolerans Lu et al. 2014
      - - O. contaminans Kämpfer et al. 2010
        - - O. bavariensis Mayr et al. 2006
          - - Paucisalibacillus globulus Nunes et al. 2006
            - O. scapharcae Shin et al. 2012

120 marker proteins based GTDB 09-RS220

- - - Cerasibacillus
    - Ornithinibacillus gellani
  - - Ornithinibacillus
      - - O. halophilus
        - - O. caprae
          - Oceanobacillus limi
      - - - O. bavariensis
          - O. contaminans
        - - - O. californiensis
            - "O. massiliensis" Pham et al. 2017
          - - O. scapharcae
            - - Paucisalibacillus globulus
              - O. halotolerans

Unassigned species:

- "O. composti" Lu et al. 2015
- "O. hominis" Liu et al. 2021
- "O. xuwenensis" Li et al. 2025

== See also ==
- List of Bacteria genera
- List of bacterial orders
