= Lentibacillus salarius =

Scientific classification
- Domain: Bacteria
- Kingdom: Bacillati
- Phylum: Bacillota
- Class: Bacilli
- Order: Caryophanales
- Family: Bacillaceae
- Genus: Lentibacillus
- Species: L. salarius

Binomial name
- Lentibacillus salarius Jeon et al. 2005

Type strain
- BH139

Species of bacterium

Lentibacillus salarius is a Gram-positive, spore-forming and moderately halophilic bacterium from the genus of Lentibacillus which has been isolated from saline sediments from the Xinjiang Province.
