= Ornithinibacillus scapharcae =

Scientific classification
- Domain: Bacteria
- Kingdom: Bacillati
- Phylum: Bacillota
- Class: Bacilli
- Order: Bacillales
- Family: Bacillaceae
- Genus: Ornithinibacillus
- Species: O. scapharcae

Binomial name
- Ornithinibacillus scapharcae Shin et al. 2012

Type strain
- JCM 17314, KACC 15116, TW25

Species of bacterium

Ornithinibacillus scapharcae is a Gram-positive, aerobic, hemolytic, spore-forming and motile bacterium from the genus of Ornithinibacillus which has been isolated from a dead ark clam from the Gang-jin Bay in Korea.
