= Virgibacillus carmonensis =

Scientific classification
- Domain: Bacteria
- Kingdom: Bacillati
- Phylum: Bacillota
- Class: Bacilli
- Order: Bacillales
- Family: Bacillaceae
- Genus: Virgibacillus
- Species: V. carmonensis

Binomial name
- Virgibacillus carmonensis Heyrman et al. 2003

Species of bacterium

Virgibacillus carmonensis is a bacterium. It is Gram-positive, rod-shaped and moderately halophilic, originally isolated from deteriorated mural paintings. LMG 20964^{T} (=DSM 14868^{T}) is its type strain.
