= Lentibacillus juripiscarius =

Scientific classification
- Domain: Bacteria
- Kingdom: Bacillati
- Phylum: Bacillota
- Class: Bacilli
- Order: Bacillales
- Family: Bacillaceae
- Genus: Lentibacillus
- Species: L. juripiscarius

Binomial name
- Lentibacillus juripiscarius Namwong et al. 2005

Species of bacterium

Lentibacillus juripiscarius is an aerobic, spore-forming, Gram-positive, moderately halophilic bacteria, with type strain IS40-3^{T} (=JCM 12147^{T} =PCU 229^{T} =TISTR 1535^{T}).
