= Oceanobacillus pacificus =

Scientific classification
- Domain: Bacteria
- Kingdom: Bacillati
- Phylum: Bacillota
- Class: Bacilli
- Order: Bacillales
- Family: Amphibacillaceae
- Genus: Oceanobacillus
- Species: O. pacificus

Binomial name
- Oceanobacillus pacificus Yu et al. 2014

Species of bacterium

Oceanobacillus pacificus is a gram positive, rod shaped, halophilic bacteria of the family Bacillaceae. Oceanobacillus pacificus species was isolated from deep-sea sediment core of the South Pacific Gyre and from marine sponge of Saint Martin's island of the Bay of Bengal, Bangladesh. The type strain is XH204T ( = DSM 25873T = JCM 18381T).
