= Virgibacillus olivae =

Scientific classification
- Domain: Bacteria
- Kingdom: Bacillati
- Phylum: Bacillota
- Class: Bacilli
- Order: Bacillales
- Family: Bacillaceae
- Genus: Virgibacillus
- Species: V. olivae

Binomial name
- Virgibacillus olivae Quesada et al. 2007

Type strain
- DSM 18098, LMG 23503, strain E308

Synonyms
- Virgibacillus sevillanensis

Species of bacteria

Virgibacillus olivae is a Gram-positive and spore-forming bacterium from the genus of Virgibacillus which has been isolated from waste water from olives from La Roda in Spain.
