= Ornithinibacillus contaminans =

Scientific classification
- Domain: Bacteria
- Kingdom: Bacillati
- Phylum: Bacillota
- Class: Bacilli
- Order: Bacillales
- Family: Bacillaceae
- Genus: Ornithinibacillus
- Species: O. contaminans

Binomial name
- Ornithinibacillus contaminans Kämpfer et al. 2010

Type strain
- CCUG 53201, DSM 22953

Species of bacterium

Ornithinibacillus contaminans is a Gram-positive and spore-forming bacterium from the genus of Ornithinibacillus which has been isolated from human blood from Gothenburg in Sweden.
