= Virgibacillus salinus =

Scientific classification
- Domain: Bacteria
- Kingdom: Bacillati
- Phylum: Bacillota
- Class: Bacilli
- Order: Bacillales
- Family: Bacillaceae
- Genus: Virgibacillus
- Species: V. salinus

Binomial name
- Virgibacillus salinus Carrasco et al. 2009

Type strain
- DSM 18441, JCM 12946, strain SA-Vb1

Species of bacteria

Virgibacillus salinus is a Gram-positive moderately halophilic bacterium from the genus of Virgibacillus.
