= Virgibacillus flavescens =

Scientific classification
- Domain: Bacteria
- Kingdom: Bacillati
- Phylum: Bacillota
- Class: Bacilli
- Order: Bacillales
- Family: Bacillaceae
- Genus: Virgibacillus
- Species: V. flavescens

Binomial name
- Virgibacillus flavescens Zhang et al. 2016

Type strain
- DSM 29015, LMG 28381, strain S1-20

Genus of bacteria

Virgibacillus flavescens is a Gram-variable, rod-shaped-forming, and motile bacterium from the genus of Virgibacillus which has been isolated from marine sediments from the Yellow Sea in China.
