= Virgibacillus halotolerans =

Scientific classification
- Domain: Bacteria
- Kingdom: Bacillati
- Phylum: Bacillota
- Class: Bacilli
- Order: Bacillales
- Family: Bacillaceae
- Genus: Virgibacillus
- Species: V. halotolerans

Binomial name
- Virgibacillus halotolerans Seiler and Wenning 2013

Type strain
- DSM 25060, LMG 26644, WS 4627

Genus of bacteria

Virgibacillus halotolerans is a Gram-positive, strictly aerobic and weakly motile bacterium from the genus of Virgibacillus which has been isolated from a dairy product from Bavaria in Germany.
