= Jeotgalibacillus marinus =

Scientific classification
- Domain: Bacteria
- Kingdom: Bacillati
- Phylum: Bacillota
- Class: Bacilli
- Order: Caryophanales
- Family: Caryophanaceae
- Genus: Jeotgalibacillus
- Species: J. marinus

Binomial name
- Jeotgalibacillus marinus Yoon et al, 2010

Synonyms
- Bacillus marinus Marinibacillus marinus

Species of bacterium

Jeotgalibacillus marinus is a bacterium used as a soil inoculant in agriculture and horticulture.
