= Ornithinibacillus bavariensis =

Scientific classification
- Domain: Bacteria
- Kingdom: Bacillati
- Phylum: Bacillota
- Class: Bacilli
- Order: Bacillales
- Family: Bacillaceae
- Genus: Ornithinibacillus
- Species: O. bavariensis

Binomial name
- Ornithinibacillus bavariensis Mayr et al. 2006

Type strain
- CCM 7096, CIP 109287, DSM 15681, WSBC 24001

Species of bacterium

Ornithinibacillus bavariensis is a Gram-positive, aerobic, rod-shaped and motile bacterium from the genus of Ornithinibacillus which has been isolated from pasteurized milk from Bavaria in Germany.
