= Lentibacillus persicus =

Scientific classification
- Domain: Bacteria
- Kingdom: Bacillati
- Phylum: Bacillota
- Class: Bacilli
- Order: Bacillales
- Family: Bacillaceae
- Genus: Lentibacillus
- Species: L. persicus

Binomial name
- Lentibacillus persicus Sánchez-Porro et al. 2010

Type strain
- Amb31

Species of bacterium

Lentibacillus persicus is a Gram-positive, endospore-forming, moderately halophilic and facultatively anaerobic bacterium from the genus of Lentibacillus which has been isolated from water from the lake Aran-Bidgol in Iran.
