= Pseudogracilibacillus endophyticus =

Scientific classification
- Domain: Bacteria
- Kingdom: Bacillati
- Phylum: Bacillota
- Class: Bacilli
- Order: Bacillales
- Family: Bacillaceae
- Genus: Pseudogracilibacillus
- Species: P. endophyticus

Binomial name
- Pseudogracilibacillus endophyticus Park et al. 2018

Type strain
- JCM 31192, KCTC 33854, DT7-02

Species of bacterium

Pseudogracilibacillus endophyticus is a gram-positive bacterium from the genus of Pseudogracilibacillus which has been isolated from the roots of the plant Oenothera biennis.
