= Virgibacillus profundi =

Scientific classification
- Domain: Bacteria
- Kingdom: Bacillati
- Phylum: Bacillota
- Class: Bacilli
- Order: Bacillales
- Family: Bacillaceae
- Genus: Virgibacillus
- Species: V. profundi

Binomial name
- Virgibacillus profundi Xu et al. 2018

Type strain
- CGMCC 1.16139, NBRC 113015, IO3-P3-H5, IO5-P3-B8

Species of bacteria

Virgibacillus profundi is a Gram-variable, moderately halophilic, endospore-forming and motile bacterium from the genus of Virgibacillus.
