= Virgibacillus campisalis =

Scientific classification
- Domain: Bacteria
- Kingdom: Bacillati
- Phylum: Bacillota
- Class: Bacilli
- Order: Bacillales
- Family: Bacillaceae
- Genus: Virgibacillus
- Species: V. campisalis

Binomial name
- Virgibacillus campisalis Lee et al. 2012

Type strain
- CCUG 59308, KCTC 13727, strain IDS-20

Genus of bacteria

Virgibacillus campisalis is a Gram-variable, endospore-forming, rod-shaped and motile bacterium from the genus of Virgibacillus which has been isolated from sediments from a marine solar saltern from the west coast of Korea.
