= Lentibacillus halodurans =

Scientific classification
- Domain: Bacteria
- Kingdom: Bacillati
- Phylum: Bacillota
- Class: Bacilli
- Order: Bacillales
- Family: Bacillaceae
- Genus: Lentibacillus
- Species: L. halodurans

Binomial name
- Lentibacillus halodurans Yuan et al. 2007

Type strain
- 8-1

Species of bacterium

Lentibacillus halodurans is a Gram-positive, moderately halophilic, rod-shaped and spore-forming bacterium from the genus of Lentibacillus which has been isolated from sediments from a neutral salt lake in Xin-Jiang.
