= Jeotgalibacillus salarius =

Scientific classification
- Domain: Bacteria
- Kingdom: Bacillati
- Phylum: Bacillota
- Class: Bacilli
- Order: Caryophanales
- Family: Caryophanaceae
- Genus: Jeotgalibacillus
- Species: J. salarius

Binomial name
- Jeotgalibacillus salarius Yoon et al. 2010

Type strain
- CCUG 56751, DSM 23492, KCTC 13257, strain ASL-1

Species of bacterium

Jeotgalibacillus salarius is a Gram-variable, rod-shaped and motile bacterium from the genus Jeotgalibacillus which has been isolated from sediments from a marine saltern from the coast of the Yellow Sea in Korea.
