= Virgibacillus dokdonensis =

Scientific classification
- Domain: Bacteria
- Kingdom: Bacillati
- Phylum: Bacillota
- Class: Bacilli
- Order: Bacillales
- Family: Bacillaceae
- Genus: Virgibacillus
- Species: V. dokdonensis

Binomial name
- Virgibacillus dokdonensis Yoon et al. 2005

Type strain
- DSM 16826, KCTC 3933, NY-1, NY-11, NY-6, strain DSW-10

Genus of bacteria

Virgibacillus dokdonensis is a Gram-variable, endospore-forming, and slightly halophilic bacterium from the genus of Virgibacillus which has been isolated from sea water from the Liancourt Rocks in Korea.
