= Virgibacillus proomii =

Scientific classification
- Domain: Bacteria
- Kingdom: Bacillati
- Phylum: Bacillota
- Class: Bacilli
- Order: Bacillales
- Family: Bacillaceae
- Genus: Virgibacillus
- Species: V. proomii

Binomial name
- Virgibacillus proomii Heyndrickx et al. 1999

Species of bacteria

Virgibacillus proomii is a species of Gram-positive bacteria. Strains of this species were originally isolated from soil samples in England and formerly identified as strains of Bacillus pantothenticus. The species is named for British microbiologist Harold Proom.
