= Virgibacillus necropolis =

Scientific classification
- Domain: Bacteria
- Kingdom: Bacillati
- Phylum: Bacillota
- Class: Bacilli
- Order: Bacillales
- Family: Bacillaceae
- Genus: Virgibacillus
- Species: V. necropolis

Binomial name
- Virgibacillus necropolis Heyrman et al. 2003

Species of bacterium

Virgibacillus necropolis is a bacterium. It is Gram-positive, rod-shaped and moderately halophilic, originally isolated from deteriorated mural paintings. LMG 19488^{T} (=DSM 14866^{T}) is its type strain.
