= Lentibacillus cibarius =

Scientific classification
- Domain: Bacteria
- Kingdom: Bacillati
- Phylum: Bacillota
- Class: Bacilli
- Order: Bacillales
- Family: Bacillaceae
- Genus: Lentibacillus
- Species: L. cibarius

Binomial name
- Lentibacillus cibarius Oh et al. 2021

Type strain
- NKC220-2

Species of bacterium

Lentibacillus cibarius is a Gram-positive, aerobic, spore-forming, halophilic, rod-shaped and non-motile bacterium from the genus of Lentibacillus which has been isolated from Kimchi.
