= Jeotgalibacillus soli =

Scientific classification
- Domain: Bacteria
- Kingdom: Bacillati
- Phylum: Bacillota
- Class: Bacilli
- Order: Caryophanales
- Family: Caryophanaceae
- Genus: Jeotgalibacillus
- Species: J. soli

Binomial name
- Jeotgalibacillus soli (Cunha et al. 2011) Cunha et al. 2012

Type strain
- P9

Species of bacterium

Jeotgalibacillus soli is a Gram-positive, rod-shaped, spore-forming and motile bacterium from the genus Jeotgalibacillus which has been isolated from soil from Sines in Portugal.
