= Pseudogracilibacillus marinus =

Scientific classification
- Domain: Bacteria
- Kingdom: Bacillati
- Phylum: Bacillota
- Class: Bacilli
- Order: Bacillales
- Family: Bacillaceae
- Genus: Pseudogracilibacillus
- Species: P. marinus

Binomial name
- Pseudogracilibacillus marinus Verma et al. 2016

Type strain
- KACC 18456, MTCC 12376, NIOT-bflm-S4, TBRC 5831

Species of bacterium

Pseudogracilibacillus marinus is a Gram-positive, rod-shaped, endospore-forming, aerobic and motile bacterium from the genus of Pseudogracilibacillus which has been isolated from biofilm from seawater.
