= Lentibacillus halophilus =

Scientific classification
- Domain: Bacteria
- Kingdom: Bacillati
- Phylum: Bacillota
- Class: Bacilli
- Order: Bacillales
- Family: Bacillaceae
- Genus: Lentibacillus
- Species: L. halophilus

Binomial name
- Lentibacillus halophilus Tanasupawat et al. 2006

Type strain
- PS11-2

Species of bacterium

Lentibacillus halophilus is a Gram-positive, strictly aerobic, extremely halophilic and spore-forming bacterium from the genus of Lentibacillus which has been isolated from Nam pla.
