= Virgibacillus marismortui =

Scientific classification
- Domain: Bacteria
- Kingdom: Bacillati
- Phylum: Bacillota
- Class: Bacilli
- Order: Bacillales
- Family: Bacillaceae
- Genus: Virgibacillus
- Species: V. marismortui

Binomial name
- Virgibacillus marismortui (Arahal et al. 1999) Heyrman et al. 2003

Type strain
- ATCC 700626, CECT 5066, CIP 105609, DSM 12325, LMG 18992, NY-13, strain 123

Synonyms
- Bacillus marismortui; Salibacillus marismortui

Genus of bacteria

Virgibacillus marismortui is a Gram-positive, moderately halophilic and rod-shaped bacterium which has been isolated from water from the Dead Sea.
