= Lentibacillus garicola =

Scientific classification
- Domain: Bacteria
- Kingdom: Bacillati
- Phylum: Bacillota
- Class: Bacilli
- Order: Bacillales
- Family: Bacillaceae
- Genus: Lentibacillus
- Species: L. garicola

Binomial name
- Lentibacillus garicola Jung et al. 2015

Type strain
- SL-MJ1

Species of bacterium

Lentibacillus garicola is a Gram-positive, aerobic and moderately halophilic bacterium from the genus of Lentibacillus which has been isolated from Myeolchi-aekjeot.
