= Lentibacillus salinarum =

Scientific classification
- Domain: Bacteria
- Kingdom: Bacillati
- Phylum: Bacillota
- Class: Bacilli
- Order: Bacillales
- Family: Bacillaceae
- Genus: Lentibacillus
- Species: L. salinarum

Binomial name
- Lentibacillus salinarum Lee et al. 2008

Type strain
- AHS-1

Species of bacterium

Lentibacillus salinarum is a Gram-positive, rod-shaped, moderately halophilic and motile bacterium from the genus of Lentibacillus which has been isolated from a marine solar saltern in Korea.
