= Lentibacillus amyloliquefaciens =

Scientific classification
- Domain: Bacteria
- Kingdom: Bacillati
- Phylum: Bacillota
- Class: Bacilli
- Order: Bacillales
- Family: Bacillaceae
- Genus: Lentibacillus
- Species: L. amyloliquefaciens

Binomial name
- Lentibacillus amyloliquefaciens Wang et al. 2016

Type strain
- LAM0015

Species of bacterium

Lentibacillus amyloliquefaciens is a Gram-positive, non-spore-forming, aerobic, rod-shaped and halophilic bacterium from the genus of Lentibacillus which has been isolated from saline sediments from the Yantai City.
