= Lentibacillus salis =

Scientific classification
- Domain: Bacteria
- Kingdom: Bacillati
- Phylum: Bacillota
- Class: Bacilli
- Order: Bacillales
- Family: Bacillaceae
- Genus: Lentibacillus
- Species: L. salis

Binomial name
- Lentibacillus salis Lee et al. 2008

Type strain
- BH113

Species of bacterium

Lentibacillus salis is a Gram-positive, aerobic, moderately halophilic, spore-forming and motile bacterium from the genus of Lentibacillus which has been isolated from a salt lake from the Xinjiang Province.
