= Oceanobacillus profundus =

Scientific classification
- Domain: Bacteria
- Kingdom: Bacillati
- Phylum: Bacillota
- Class: Bacilli
- Order: Bacillales
- Family: Amphibacillaceae
- Genus: Oceanobacillus
- Species: O. profundus

Binomial name
- Oceanobacillus profundus Kim et al. 2007

Species of bacterium

Oceanobacillus profundus is a gram positive, rod shaped, halophilic bacteria of the family Bacillaceae. Oceanobacillus profundus was isolated from the surface of a sediment core sample of the Tsushima Basin of the Sea of Japan, Korea, and from marine sponge of Saint Martin's island of the Bay of Bengal, Bangladesh. The type strain is CL-MP28T (=KCCM 42318T=DSM 18246T). Sponge associated Oceanobacillus profundus strain CS 9 was highly salt tolarent.
