= Oceanobacillus kimchii =

Scientific classification
- Domain: Bacteria
- Kingdom: Bacillati
- Phylum: Bacillota
- Class: Bacilli
- Order: Bacillales
- Family: Amphibacillaceae
- Genus: Oceanobacillus
- Species: O. kimchii

Binomial name
- Oceanobacillus kimchii Whon et al. 2011

Species of bacterium

Oceanobacillus kimchii is a bacterium, named after kimchi, where the first isolate was found. Its cells are rod-shaped and the type strain is X50T (=JCM 16803^{T} =KACC 14914^{T} =DSM 23341^{T}). Oceanobacillus kimchii is also found in the marine sponges.

== Characteristics of Oceanobacillus kimchii ==
S.I. Paul et al. (2021) isolated and identified Oceanobacillus kimchii (strains ISP152A, ISP172B, and KSP141C) from marine sponges of the Saint Martin's Island Area of the Bay of Bengal, Bangladesh. Colony, morphological, physiological, and biochemical characteristics of Oceanobacillus kimchii are shown in the Table below.

| Test type | Test | Characteristics |
|---|---|---|
| Colony characters | Size | Small |
| Colony characters | Type | Round |
| Colony characters | Color | Creamy |
| Colony characters | Shape | Convex |
| Morphological characters | Shape | Rod |
| Physiological characters | Motility | + |
| Physiological characters | Growth at 6.5% NaCl | + |
| Biochemical characters | Gram's staining | + |
| Biochemical characters | Oxidase | + |
| Biochemical characters | Catalase | + |
| Biochemical characters | Oxidative-Fermentative | Fermentative |
| Biochemical characters | Motility | + |
| Biochemical characters | Methyl Red | – |
| Biochemical characters | Voges-Proskauer | – |
| Biochemical characters | Indole | – |
| Biochemical characters | H_{2}S Production | – |
| Biochemical characters | Urease | – |
| Biochemical characters | Nitrate reductase | – |
| Biochemical characters | β-Galactosidase | + |
| Hydrolysis of | Gelatin | + |
| Hydrolysis of | Aesculin | – |
| Hydrolysis of | Casein | + |
| Hydrolysis of | Tween 40 | + |
| Hydrolysis of | Tween 60 | + |
| Hydrolysis of | Tween 80 | + |
| Acid production from | Glycerol | + |
| Acid production from | Galactose | + |
| Acid production from | D-Glucose | + |
| Acid production from | D-Fructose | + |
| Acid production from | D-Mannose | + |
| Acid production from | Mannitol | + |
| Acid production from | N-Acetylglucosamine | + |
| Acid production from | Amygdalin | – |
| Acid production from | Maltose | + |
| Acid production from | D-Melibiose | + |
| Acid production from | D-Trehalose | + |
| Acid production from | Glycogen | + |
| Acid production from | D-Turanose | + |

Note: + = Positive, – =Negative
