= Oceanobacillus chironomi =

Scientific classification
- Domain: Bacteria
- Kingdom: Bacillati
- Phylum: Bacillota
- Class: Bacilli
- Order: Bacillales
- Family: Amphibacillaceae
- Genus: Oceanobacillus
- Species: O. chironomi

Binomial name
- Oceanobacillus chironomi Raats and Halpern 2007

Species of bacterium

Oceanobacillus chironomi is a bacterium. It is Gram-positive, motile by peritrichous flagella, endospore-forming, halotolerant and facultatively alkaliphilic. The type strain is T3944D^{T} (=LMG 23627^{T} =DSM 18262^{T}).
