= Virgibacillus arcticus =

Scientific classification
- Domain: Bacteria
- Kingdom: Bacillati
- Phylum: Bacillota
- Class: Bacilli
- Order: Bacillales
- Family: Bacillaceae
- Genus: Virgibacillus
- Species: V. arcticus

Binomial name
- Virgibacillus arcticus Niederberger et al. 2009

Species of bacterium

Virgibacillus arcticus is a moderately halophilic, endospore-forming bacterium originally isolated from permafrost in the Canadian high Arctic. Its type strain is Hal1^{T} (=DSM 19574^{T} =JCM 14839^{T}).
