= Lentibacillus lacisalsi =

Scientific classification
- Domain: Bacteria
- Kingdom: Bacillati
- Phylum: Bacillota
- Class: Bacilli
- Order: Bacillales
- Family: Bacillaceae
- Genus: Lentibacillus
- Species: L. lacisalsi

Binomial name
- Lentibacillus lacisalsi Lim et al. 2005

Type strain
- BH260

Species of bacterium

Lentibacillus lacisalsi is a spore-forming, aerobic and moderately halophilic bacterium from the genus of Lentibacillus which has been isolated from a salt lake in China.
