= Virgibacillus natechei =

Scientific classification
- Domain: Bacteria
- Kingdom: Bacillati
- Phylum: Bacillota
- Class: Bacilli
- Order: Bacillales
- Family: Bacillaceae
- Genus: Virgibacillus
- Species: V. natechei

Binomial name
- Virgibacillus natechei Amziane et al. 2016

Type strain
- CCUG 62224, DSM 25609, FarD

Species of bacteria

Virgibacillus natechei is a Gram-positive and moderately halophilic bacterium from the genus of Virgibacillus which has been isolated from sediments from a saline lake from Bechar in Algeria.
