= Oceanobacillus oncorhynchi =

Scientific classification
- Domain: Bacteria
- Kingdom: Bacillati
- Phylum: Bacillota
- Class: Bacilli
- Order: Bacillales
- Family: Amphibacillaceae
- Genus: Oceanobacillus
- Species: O. oncorhynchi

Binomial name
- Oceanobacillus oncorhynchi Yumoto et al. 2005

Species of bacterium

Oceanobacillus oncorhynchi is a halotolerant, obligately alkaliphilic bacterium first isolated from the skin of a rainbow trout (Oncorhynchus mykiss), hence its name. It is Gram-positive, rod-shaped and motile by peritrichous flagella and produces ellipsoidal spores. The type strain is R-2(T) (=JCM 12661(T) =NCIMB 14022(T)).
