= Jeotgalibacillus alkaliphilus =

Scientific classification
- Domain: Bacteria
- Kingdom: Bacillati
- Phylum: Bacillota
- Class: Bacilli
- Order: Caryophanales
- Family: Caryophanaceae
- Genus: Jeotgalibacillus
- Species: J. alkaliphilus

Binomial name
- Jeotgalibacillus alkaliphilus Srinivas et al. 2016

Type strain
- KCTC 33662, LMG 28756, strain JC303

Species of bacterium

Jeotgalibacillus alkaliphilus is a Gram-positive, rod-shaped and non-motile bacterium from the genus Jeotgalibacillus which has been isolated from a solar salt pan.
