= Virgibacillus salarius =

Scientific classification
- Domain: Bacteria
- Kingdom: Bacillati
- Phylum: Bacillota
- Class: Bacilli
- Order: Bacillales
- Family: Bacillaceae
- Genus: Virgibacillus
- Species: V. salarius

Binomial name
- Virgibacillus salarius Hua et al. 2008

Type strain
- DSM 18441, JCM 12946, strain SA-Vb1

Species of bacteria

Virgibacillus salarius is a bacterium from the genus of Virgibacillus which has been isolated from a salt crust from the Gharsa salt lake from Chott el Gharsa in Tunisia.
