= Jeotgalibacillus campisalis =

Scientific classification
- Domain: Bacteria
- Kingdom: Bacillati
- Phylum: Bacillota
- Class: Bacilli
- Order: Caryophanales
- Family: Caryophanaceae
- Genus: Jeotgalibacillus
- Species: J. campisalis

Binomial name
- Jeotgalibacillus campisalis (Yoon et al. 2004) Yoon et al. 2010

Type strain
- JCM 11810, KCCM 41644, strain SF-57

Synonyms
- Marinibacillus campisalis

Species of bacterium

Jeotgalibacillus campisalis is a Gram-positive, endospore-forming, rod-shaped, moderate halophilic and motile bacterium from the genus Jeotgalibacillus which has been isolated from a marine solar saltern from Korea.
