= Virgibacillus sediminis =

Scientific classification
- Domain: Bacteria
- Kingdom: Bacillati
- Phylum: Bacillota
- Class: Bacilli
- Order: Bacillales
- Family: Bacillaceae
- Genus: Virgibacillus
- Species: V. sediminis

Binomial name
- Virgibacillus sediminis Chen et al. 2009

Type strain
- CCTCC AA 207023, DSM 19797, KCTC 13193, YIM kkny3

Species of bacteria

Virgibacillus sediminis is a Gram-positive, moderately halophilic, strictly aerobic and alkalitolerant bacterium from the genus of Virgibacillus which has been isolated from sediments from the Keke salt lake in the Qaidam Basin in China.
