= Lentibacillus panjinensis =

Scientific classification
- Domain: Bacteria
- Kingdom: Bacillati
- Phylum: Bacillota
- Class: Bacilli
- Order: Bacillales
- Family: Bacillaceae
- Genus: Lentibacillus
- Species: L. panjinensis

Binomial name
- Lentibacillus panjinensis Li et al. 2020

Type strain
- G56

Species of bacterium

Lentibacillus panjinensis is a Gram-positive, aerobic, short rod-shaped and motile bacterium from the genus of Lentibacillus which has been isolated from Shrimp paste from Panjin.
