= Lentibacillus lipolyticus =

Scientific classification
- Domain: Bacteria
- Kingdom: Bacillati
- Phylum: Bacillota
- Class: Bacilli
- Order: Bacillales
- Family: Bacillaceae
- Genus: Lentibacillus
- Species: L. lipolyticus

Binomial name
- Lentibacillus lipolyticus Booncharoen et al. 2019

Type strain
- SSKP1-9

Species of bacterium

Lentibacillus lipolyticus is a Gram-positive, aerobic, spore-forming and moderately halophilic bacterium from the genus of Lentibacillus which has been isolated from shrimp paste from the Samut Sakhon province.
