= Pseudogracilibacillus auburnensis =

Scientific classification
- Domain: Bacteria
- Kingdom: Bacillati
- Phylum: Bacillota
- Class: Bacilli
- Order: Bacillales
- Family: Bacillaceae
- Genus: Pseudogracilibacillus
- Species: P. auburnensis

Binomial name
- Pseudogracilibacillus auburnensis Glaeser et al. 2014

Type strain
- CCM 8509, CIP 110797, LMG 28212, P-207

Species of bacterium

Pseudogracilibacillus auburnensis is a Gram-positive, aerobic and endospore-forming bacterium from the genus of Pseudogracilibacillus which has been isolated from the rhizosphere from the corn plant (Zea mays) from Auburn in the United States.
