= Virgibacillus ndiopensis =

Scientific classification
- Domain: Bacteria
- Kingdom: Bacillati
- Phylum: Bacillota
- Class: Bacilli
- Order: Bacillales
- Family: Bacillaceae
- Genus: Virgibacillus
- Species: V. ndiopensis

Binomial name
- Virgibacillus ndiopensis Senghor et al. 2017

Species of bacteria

Virgibacillus ndiopensis is a halophilic bacterium from the genus of Virgibacillus.
