= Virgibacillus phasianinus =

Scientific classification
- Domain: Bacteria
- Kingdom: Bacillati
- Phylum: Bacillota
- Class: Bacilli
- Order: Bacillales
- Family: Bacillaceae
- Genus: Virgibacillus
- Species: V. phasianinus

Binomial name
- Virgibacillus phasianinus Tak et al. 2018

Type strain
- JCM 32144, KCTC 33927, LM2416

Species of bacteria

Virgibacillus phasianinus is a Gram-positive, rod-shaped, aerobic and motile bacterium from the genus of Virgibacillus which has been isolated from the faeces of a Swinhoe's pheasant from the Seoul Grand Park in Korea.
