= Virgibacillus indicus =

Scientific classification
- Domain: Bacteria
- Kingdom: Bacillati
- Phylum: Bacillota
- Class: Bacilli
- Order: Bacillales
- Family: Bacillaceae
- Genus: Virgibacillus
- Species: V. indicus

Binomial name
- Virgibacillus indicus Xu et al. 2018

Type strain
- CGMCC 1.16138, NBRC 113014, strain P2-C2

Genus of bacteria

Virgibacillus indicus is a Gram-variable, endospore-forming, moderately halophilic and motile bacterium from the genus of Virgibacillus which has been isolated from sediments from the Indian Ocean.
