= Virgibacillus byunsanensis =

Scientific classification
- Domain: Bacteria
- Kingdom: Bacillati
- Phylum: Bacillota
- Class: Bacilli
- Order: Bacillales
- Family: Bacillaceae
- Genus: Virgibacillus
- Species: V. byunsanensis

Binomial name
- Virgibacillus byunsanensis Yoon et al. 2010

Type strain
- CCUG 56754, DSM 23507, KCTC 13259, strain ISL-24

Genus of bacteria

Virgibacillus byunsanensis is a Gram-variable, endospore-forming, rod-shaped and motile bacterium from the genus of Virgibacillus which has been isolated from sediments from a marine solar saltern from the Yellow Sea in Korea.
