= Virgibacillus oceani =

Scientific classification
- Domain: Bacteria
- Kingdom: Bacillati
- Phylum: Bacillota
- Class: Bacilli
- Order: Bacillales
- Family: Bacillaceae
- Genus: Virgibacillus
- Species: V. oceani

Binomial name
- Virgibacillus oceani Yin et al. 2015

Type strain
- CGMCC 1.12754, LMG 28105, MCCC 1A09973, strain MY11

Species of bacteria

Virgibacillus oceani is a Gram-positive, moderately halophilic, endospore, rod-shaped-forming, strictly aerobic and motile bacterium from the genus of Virgibacillus which has been isolated from sediments from the Pacific Ocean.
