= Oceanobacillus neutriphilus =

Scientific classification
- Domain: Bacteria
- Kingdom: Bacillati
- Phylum: Bacillota
- Class: Bacilli
- Order: Bacillales
- Family: Amphibacillaceae
- Genus: Oceanobacillus
- Species: O. neutriphilus

Binomial name
- Oceanobacillus neutriphilus Yang et al. 2010

Species of bacterium

Oceanobacillus neutriphilus is a bacterium. It is Gram-positive, neutrophilic, and rod-shaped its type strain being strain A1g^{T} (=5CGMCC 1.7693^{T} =5JCM 15776^{T}).
