= Virgibacillus salexigens =

Scientific classification
- Domain: Bacteria
- Kingdom: Bacillati
- Phylum: Bacillota
- Class: Bacilli
- Order: Bacillales
- Family: Bacillaceae
- Genus: Virgibacillus
- Species: V. salexigens

Binomial name
- Virgibacillus salexigens Heyrman et al. 2003

Species of bacteria

Virgibacillus salexigens is a species of Gram-positive bacteria.

== Taxonomy ==
This species was formerly contained by the genus Salibacillus and before that by Bacillus. Strains of this species were originally isolated from salterns and saline soil samples in Spain. They are spore-forming, slightly aerobic, and moderately halophilic.
