= Ornithinibacillus californiensis =

Scientific classification
- Domain: Bacteria
- Kingdom: Bacillati
- Phylum: Bacillota
- Class: Bacilli
- Order: Bacillales
- Family: Bacillaceae
- Genus: Ornithinibacillus
- Species: O. californiensis

Binomial name
- Ornithinibacillus californiensis Mayr et al. 2006

Type strain
- CCM 7237, CIP 109288, DSM 16628, MB-9

Species of bacterium

Ornithinibacillus californiensis is a bacterium from the genus of Ornithinibacillus which has been isolated from marine sediments from the Mission Bay in San Diego in the United States.
