= Jeotgalibacillus malaysiensis =

Scientific classification
- Domain: Bacteria
- Kingdom: Bacillati
- Phylum: Bacillota
- Class: Bacilli
- Order: Caryophanales
- Family: Caryophanaceae
- Genus: Jeotgalibacillus
- Species: J. malaysiensis

Binomial name
- Jeotgalibacillus malaysiensis Yaakop et al. 2015

Type strain
- DSM 28777, KCTC 33550, strain D5

Species of bacterium

Jeotgalibacillus malaysiensis is a Gram-positive, endospore-forming and rod-shaped bacterium from the genus Jeotgalibacillus which has been isolated from seawater from the beach of Desaru in Malaysia.
