= Ornithinibacillus halophilus =

Scientific classification
- Domain: Bacteria
- Kingdom: Bacillati
- Phylum: Bacillota
- Class: Bacilli
- Order: Bacillales
- Family: Bacillaceae
- Genus: Ornithinibacillus
- Species: O. halophilus

Binomial name
- Ornithinibacillus halophilus Bagheri et al. 2013

Type strain
- DSM 23996, IBRC-M 10444, J8B

Species of bacterium

Ornithinibacillus halophilus is a Gram-positive, moderately halophilic, rod-shaped and motile bacterium from the genus of Ornithinibacillus which has been isolated from brine from the Aran-Bidgol Salt Lake in Iran.
