= Virgibacillus kapii =

Scientific classification
- Domain: Bacteria
- Kingdom: Bacillati
- Phylum: Bacillota
- Class: Bacilli
- Order: Bacillales
- Family: Bacillaceae
- Genus: Virgibacillus
- Species: V. kapii

Binomial name
- Virgibacillus kapii Daroonpunt et al. 2016

Type strain
- JCM 30071, LMG 28282, PCU 345, TISTR 2279, strain KN3-8-4

Synonyms
- Virgibacillus kapialis

Genus of bacteria

Virgibacillus kapii is a Gram-positive and rod-shaped bacterium from the genus of Virgibacillus which has been isolated from Thai shrimp paste from Nakhon Si Thammarat Province in Thailand.
