= Virgibacillus chiguensis =

Scientific classification
- Domain: Bacteria
- Kingdom: Bacillati
- Phylum: Bacillota
- Class: Bacilli
- Order: Bacillales
- Family: Bacillaceae
- Genus: Virgibacillus
- Species: V. chiguensis

Binomial name
- Virgibacillus chiguensis Wang et al. 2008

Species of bacterium

Virgibacillus chiguensis is a bacterium. It is Gram-positive, rod-shaped, motile, endospore-forming and halophilic, with NTU-101^{T} (=BCRC 17637^{T} =CGMCC 1.6496^{T}) as the type strain.
