= Paucisalibacillus algeriensis =

Scientific classification
- Domain: Bacteria
- Kingdom: Bacillati
- Phylum: Bacillota
- Class: Bacilli
- Order: Bacillales
- Family: Bacillaceae
- Genus: Paucisalibacillus
- Species: P. algeriensis

Binomial name
- Paucisalibacillus algeriensis Bendjama et al. 2014

Type strain
- EB02

Species of bacterium

Paucisalibacillus algeriensis is a bacterium from the genus of Paucisalibacillus which has been isolated from hypersaline soil from the Ezzemoul Sabkha lake from Oum El Bouaghi in Algeria.
