= Lentibacillus jeotgali =

Scientific classification
- Domain: Bacteria
- Kingdom: Bacillati
- Phylum: Bacillota
- Class: Bacilli
- Order: Bacillales
- Family: Bacillaceae
- Genus: Lentibacillus
- Species: L. jeotgali

Binomial name
- Lentibacillus jeotgali Jung et al. 2010

Type strain
- Grbi

Species of bacterium

Lentibacillus jeotgali is a Gram-positive, endospore-forming, moderately halophilic and non-motile bacterium from the genus of Lentibacillus which has been isolated from fermented seafood.
