= Oceanobacillus iheyensis =

Scientific classification
- Domain: Bacteria
- Kingdom: Bacillati
- Phylum: Bacillota
- Class: Bacilli
- Order: Bacillales
- Family: Amphibacillaceae
- Genus: Oceanobacillus
- Species: O. iheyensis

Binomial name
- Oceanobacillus iheyensis Lu et al. 2002

Species of bacterium

Oceanobacillus iheyensis is a bacterium, the type species of its genus. It is a deep-sea species, having been isolated from a depth of 1,050 metres (3,440 ft), and is extremely halotolerant and alkaliphilic. Its type strain is HTE831 (JCM 11309^{T}, DSM 14371^{T}). Oceanobacillus iheyensis HTE831 is an alkaliphilic and extremely halotolerant Bacillus-related species isolated from deep-sea sediment.
