= Jeotgalibacillus =

Scientific classification
- Domain: Bacteria
- Kingdom: Bacillati
- Phylum: Bacillota
- Class: Bacilli
- Order: Caryophanales
- Family: Caryophanaceae
- Genus: Jeotgalibacillus; Yoon et al. 2001

Type species
- Jeotgalibacillus alimentarius Yoon et al. 2001

Species
- J. alimentarius; J. alkaliphilus; "J. aurantiacus"; J. campisalis; J. malaysiensis; J. marinus; J. proteolyticus; J. salarius; J. soli; J. terrae

Synonyms
- Marinibacillus Yoon et al. 2001

Genus of bacteria

Jeotgalibacillus is a Gram-positive bacterial genus from the family Caryophanaceae.

== Phylogeny ==
The currently accepted taxonomy is based on the List of Prokaryotic names with Standing in Nomenclature (LPSN) and National Center for Biotechnology Information (NCBI).

16S rRNA based LTP_10_2024

- Jeotgalibacillus
  - - J. soli Cunha et al. 2012 non Chen et al. 2010
    - - J. proteolyticus Li et al. 2018
      - - J. campisalis (Yoon et al. 2004) Yoon et al. 2010
        - J. marinus (Rüger & Richter 1979) Yoon et al. 2010
  - - J. salarius Yoon et al. 2010
    - - J. alkaliphilus
      - - J. terrae Srinivas et al. 2016
        - - J. alimentarius Yoon et al. 2001
          - J. malaysiensis Yaakop et al. 2015

120 marker proteins based GTDB 09-RS220

- Jeotgalibacillus
  - - J. soli
    - - J. campisalis
      - J. proteolyticus
  - - "J. aurantiacus" Jiang et al. 2022
    - - J. malaysiensis
      - - J. salarius
        - - J. alimentarius
          - J. terrae
