= Virgibacillus xinjiangensis =

Scientific classification
- Domain: Bacteria
- Kingdom: Bacillati
- Phylum: Bacillota
- Class: Bacilli
- Order: Bacillales
- Family: Bacillaceae
- Genus: Virgibacillus
- Species: V. xinjiangensis

Binomial name
- Virgibacillus xinjiangensis Jeon et al. 2010

Type strain
- DSM 19031, KCTC 13128, strain SL6-1

Species of bacteria

Virgibacillus xinjiangensis is a Gram-positive, moderately halophilic spore forming and strictly aerobic bacterium from the genus of Virgibacillus which has been isolated from a salt lake from the Xinjiang Province in China.
