= Lentibacillus salicampi =

Scientific classification
- Domain: Bacteria
- Kingdom: Bacillati
- Phylum: Bacillota
- Class: Bacilli
- Order: Bacillales
- Family: Bacillaceae
- Genus: Lentibacillus
- Species: L. salicampi

Binomial name
- Lentibacillus salicampi Yoon et al. 2002

Species of bacterium

Lentibacillus salicampi is a moderately halophilic bacterium, the type species of its genus. It is Gram-variable, aerobic, endospore-forming and rod-shaped, with type strain SF-20(T) (= KCCM 41560(T) = JCM 11462(T)).
