= Lentibacillus kapialis =

Scientific classification
- Domain: Bacteria
- Kingdom: Bacillati
- Phylum: Bacillota
- Class: Bacilli
- Order: Bacillales
- Family: Bacillaceae
- Genus: Lentibacillus
- Species: L. kapialis

Binomial name
- Lentibacillus kapialis Pakdeeto et al. 2007

Type strain
- PN7-6

Species of bacterium

Lentibacillus kapialis is a Gram-positive, strictly aerobic and moderately halophilic bacterium from the genus of Lentibacillus which has been isolated from fermented shrimp paste from Thailand.
