= Virgibacillus kekensis =

Scientific classification
- Domain: Bacteria
- Kingdom: Bacillati
- Phylum: Bacillota
- Class: Bacilli
- Order: Bacillales
- Family: Bacillaceae
- Genus: Virgibacillus
- Species: V. kekensis

Binomial name
- Virgibacillus kekensis Chen et al. 2008

Type strain
- CGMCC 1.6298, DSM 17056, JCM 16510, YIM-kkny16

Genus of bacteria

Virgibacillus kekensis is a Gram-positive, moderately halophilic, endospore-forming, strictly aerobic and motile bacterium from the genus of Virgibacillus which has been isolated from saline mud from a salt lake in China.
