= Virgibacillus halophilus =

Scientific classification
- Domain: Bacteria
- Kingdom: Bacillati
- Phylum: Bacillota
- Class: Bacilli
- Order: Bacillales
- Family: Bacillaceae
- Genus: Virgibacillus
- Species: V. halophilus

Binomial name
- Virgibacillus halophilus An et al. 2007

Type strain
- 5B133E, 5B73C, IAM 15308, JCM 21758, KCTC 13935

Genus of bacteria

Virgibacillus halophilus is a Gram-positive, round-spore-forming, rod-shaped and halophilic bacterium from the genus of Virgibacillus which has been isolated from field soil from Kakegawa in Japan.
