= Oceanobacillus kapialis =

Scientific classification
- Domain: Bacteria
- Kingdom: Bacillati
- Phylum: Bacillota
- Class: Bacilli
- Order: Bacillales
- Family: Amphibacillaceae
- Genus: Oceanobacillus
- Species: O. kapialis

Binomial name
- Oceanobacillus kapialis Namwong et al. 2009

Species of bacterium

Oceanobacillus kapialis is a bacterium. It is a Gram-positive, rod-shaped, strictly aerobic, spore-forming, moderately halophilic bacterium. The type strain is SSK2-2 (=KCTC 13177 =PCU 300 =TISTR 1858).
