= Paucisalibacillus globulus =

Scientific classification
- Domain: Bacteria
- Kingdom: Bacillati
- Phylum: Bacillota
- Class: Bacilli
- Order: Bacillales
- Family: Bacillaceae
- Genus: Paucisalibacillus
- Species: P. globulus

Binomial name
- Paucisalibacillus globulus Nunes et al. 2006

Type strain
- B22, CIP 108857, DSM 18846, LMG 23148

Synonyms
- Globolobacillus vitreae

Species of bacterium

Paucisalibacillus globulus is a Gram-positive, spore-forming, aerobic and motile bacterium from the genus of Paucisalibacillus which has been isolated from potting soil from Portugal.
