= Pseudogracilibacillus =

Scientific classification
- Domain: Bacteria
- Kingdom: Bacillati
- Phylum: Bacillota
- Class: Bacilli
- Order: Bacillales
- Family: Bacillaceae
- Genus: Pseudogracilibacillus; Glaeser et al. 2014

Type species
- Pseudogracilibacillus auburnensis Glaeser et al. 2014

Species
- P. auburnensis; P. endophyticus; "Ca. P. intestinigallinarum"; P. marinus

Genus of bacteria

Pseudogracilibacillus is a genus of bacteria from the family of Bacillaceae.

== Phylogeny ==
The currently accepted taxonomy is based on the List of Prokaryotic names with Standing in Nomenclature (LPSN) and National Center for Biotechnology Information (NCBI).

16S rRNA based LTP_10_2024

- Pseudogracilibacillus
  - P. auburnensis Glaeser et al. 2014
  - - P. endophyticus Park et al. 2018
    - P. marinus Verma et al. 2016

120 marker proteins based GTDB 09-RS220

- Pseudogracilibacillus
  - P. auburnensis
  - "Ca. P. intestinigallinarum" Gilroy et al. 2021

== See also ==
- List of Bacteria genera
- List of bacterial orders
