= Paucisalibacillus =

Scientific classification
- Domain: Bacteria
- Kingdom: Bacillati
- Phylum: Bacillota
- Class: Bacilli
- Order: Bacillales
- Family: Bacillaceae
- Genus: Paucisalibacillus; Nunes et al. 2006

Type species
- Paucisalibacillus globulus Nunes et al. 2006

Species
- P. algeriensis; P. globulus

Synonyms
- Globolobacillus

Genus of bacteria

Paucisalibacillus is a genus of bacteria from the family of Bacillaceae.

== See also ==
- List of Bacteria genera
- List of bacterial orders
