= Virgibacillus litoralis =

Scientific classification
- Domain: Bacteria
- Kingdom: Bacillati
- Phylum: Bacillota
- Class: Bacilli
- Order: Bacillales
- Family: Bacillaceae
- Genus: Virgibacillus
- Species: V. litoralis

Binomial name
- Virgibacillus litoralis Chen et al. 2012

Type strain
- DSM 21085, JSM 089168, KCTC 13228

Genus of bacteria

Virgibacillus litoralis is a Gram-positive, moderately halophilic, endospore-forming, aerobic, rod-shaped and motile bacterium from the genus of Virgibacillus which has been isolated from saline soil.
