= Lentibacillus sediminis =

Scientific classification
- Domain: Bacteria
- Kingdom: Bacillati
- Phylum: Bacillota
- Class: Bacilli
- Order: Bacillales
- Family: Bacillaceae
- Genus: Lentibacillus
- Species: L. sediminis

Binomial name
- Lentibacillus sediminis Guo et al. 2017

Type strain
- 0W14

Synonyms
- Marinisalinus variegatus

Species of bacterium

Lentibacillus sediminis is a Gram-positive, rod-shaped, moderately halophilic, facultatively anaerobic, endospore-forming and motile bacterium from the genus of Lentibacillus which has been isolated from a marine saltern from Wendeng.
