= Virgibacillus alimentarius =

Scientific classification
- Domain: Bacteria
- Kingdom: Bacillati
- Phylum: Bacillota
- Class: Bacilli
- Order: Bacillales
- Family: Bacillaceae
- Genus: Virgibacillus
- Species: V. alimentarius

Binomial name
- Virgibacillus alimentarius Kim et al. 2011

Species of bacterium

Virgibacillus alimentarius is a bacterium first isolated from a traditional Korean food, hence its name. It is Gram-positive, rod-shaped, motile, endospore-forming and halophilic, with J18^{T} (=KACC 14624^{T} =JCM 16994^{T}) as the type strain.
