= Virgibacillus subterraneus =

Scientific classification
- Domain: Bacteria
- Kingdom: Bacillati
- Phylum: Bacillota
- Class: Bacilli
- Order: Bacillales
- Family: Bacillaceae
- Genus: Virgibacillus
- Species: V. subterraneus

Binomial name
- Virgibacillus subterraneus Wang et al. 2010

Type strain
- CGMCC 1.7734, DSM 22441, strain H57B72

Species of bacteria

Virgibacillus subterraneus is a Gram-positive and moderately halophilic bacterium from the genus of Virgibacillus which has been isolated from saline soil from the Qaidam Basin in China.
