= Lentibacillus alimentarius =

Scientific classification
- Domain: Bacteria
- Kingdom: Bacillati
- Phylum: Bacillota
- Class: Bacilli
- Order: Bacillales
- Family: Bacillaceae
- Genus: Lentibacillus
- Species: L. alimentarius

Binomial name
- Lentibacillus alimentarius Sundararaman et al. 2018

Type strain
- M2024

Species of bacterium

Lentibacillus alimentarius is a Gram-positive, endospore-forming and rod-shaped bacterium from the genus of Lentibacillus which has been isolated from the food Myeolchi-jeotgal.
