= Compostibacillus =

Scientific classification
- Domain: Bacteria
- Kingdom: Bacillati
- Phylum: Bacillota
- Class: Bacilli
- Order: Bacillales
- Family: Bacillaceae
- Genus: Compostibacillus; Yu et al. 2015

Type species
- Compostibacillus humi Yu et al. 2015

Species
- C. humi

Genus of bacteria

Compostibacillus is a Gram-positive, moderately thermophilic rod-shaped, and spore-forming genus of bacteria from the family of Bacillaceae with one known species (Compostibacillus humi). Compostibacillus humi has been isolated from sludge compost from Guangdong in China.

== See also ==
- List of Bacteria genera
- List of bacterial orders
