= Virgibacillus siamensis =

Scientific classification
- Domain: Bacteria
- Kingdom: Bacillati
- Phylum: Bacillota
- Class: Bacilli
- Order: Caryophanales
- Family: Bacillaceae
- Genus: Virgibacillus
- Species: V. siamensis

Binomial name
- Virgibacillus siamensis Tanasupawat et al. 2011

Species of bacterium

Virgibacillus siamensis is a bacterium. It is Gram-positive, rod-shaped and moderately halophilic, originally isolated from fermented fish in Thailand. MS3-4^{T} is the type strain (JCM 15395^{T} =PCU 312^{T} =TISTR 1957^{T}).
