= Ornithinibacillus heyuanensis =

Scientific classification
- Domain: Bacteria
- Kingdom: Bacillati
- Phylum: Bacillota
- Class: Bacilli
- Order: Bacillales
- Family: Bacillaceae
- Genus: Ornithinibacillus
- Species: O. heyuanensis

Binomial name
- Ornithinibacillus heyuanensis BWu et al. 2014

Type strain
- CCTCC AB 2013106, GIESS003, KCTC 33159

Species of bacterium

Ornithinibacillus heyuanensis is a Gram-positive, rod-shaped, spore-forming, hemolytic and motile bacterium from the genus of Ornithinibacillus.
