= Jeotgalibacillus alimentarius =

Scientific classification
- Domain: Bacteria
- Kingdom: Bacillati
- Phylum: Bacillota
- Class: Bacilli
- Order: Caryophanales
- Family: Caryophanaceae
- Genus: Jeotgalibacillus
- Species: J. alimentarius

Binomial name
- Jeotgalibacillus alimentarius Yoon et al. 2001

Species of bacterium

Jeotgalibacillus alimentarius is a bacterium, the type species of its genus. It was first isolated from jeotgal, hence its name. It is a moderately halophilic, round-endospore-forming bacterium, with type strain YKJ-13^{T} (= KCCM 80002^{T} = JCM 10872^{T}).
