= Oceanobacillus limi =

Scientific classification
- Domain: Bacteria
- Kingdom: Bacillati
- Phylum: Bacillota
- Class: Bacilli
- Order: Bacillales
- Family: Amphibacillaceae
- Genus: Oceanobacillus
- Species: O. limi

Binomial name
- Oceanobacillus limi Amoozegar et al. 2014

Species of bacterium

Oceanobacillus limi is a gram positive, rod shaped, halophilic bacteria of the family Bacillaceae. Oceanobacillus limi was isolated from a mud sample of the hypersaline lake Aran-Bidgol in Iran and also from marine sponge (Plakortic dariae) of Saint Martin's island of the Bay of Bengal, Bangladesh. The type strain of Oceanobacillus limi is strain H9BT ( = IBRC-M 10780T = KCTC 13823T = CECT 7997T). Oceanobacillus limi cannot produce indole or H2S.
