= Lentibacillus saliphilus =

Scientific classification
- Domain: Bacteria
- Kingdom: Bacillati
- Phylum: Bacillota
- Class: Bacilli
- Order: Bacillales
- Family: Bacillaceae
- Genus: Lentibacillus
- Species: L. saliphilus

Binomial name
- Lentibacillus saliphilus Wang et al. 2021

Type strain
- YIM 93176

Species of bacterium

Lentibacillus saliphilus is a moderately halophilic bacterium from the genus of Lentibacillus.
