= White Dome Geyser =

Geyser in the Lower Geyser Basin of Yellowstone National Park

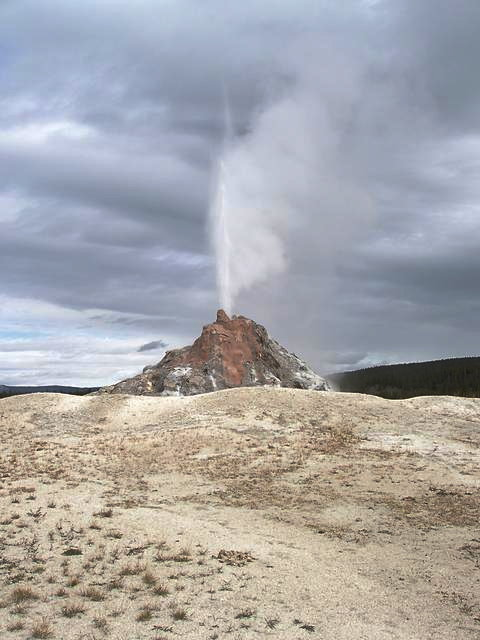
- White Dome Geyser cone
- Interactive map of White Dome Geyser
- Location: Lower Geyser Basin, Yellowstone National Park, Teton County, Wyoming
- Coordinates: 44°32′22″N 110°48′10″W
- Type: Cone geyser
- Eruption height: 30 feet (9.1 m)
- Frequency: 8 minutes to >3 hours
- Duration: 2 minutes

White Dome Geyser is a geyser located in the Lower Geyser Basin in Yellowstone National Park in the United States.

White Dome is a conspicuous cone-type geyser located on the western side of Firehole Lake Drive. It is easily seen by people waiting for eruptions of nearby Great Fountain Geyser. Its 12-foot-high geyserite cone is one of the largest in the park. Eruptions are unpredictable, but generally occur with intervals (= eruption start to eruption start) ranging from 15 minutes to 3 hours. The shortest reported intervals have been 8 to 11 minutes. Intervals between 20 and 35 minutes are most common. Eruptions last about 2 minutes and reach heights of about 30 feet (9.1 m), the maximum height being attained early in the eruption. As usual for cone-type geysers, the play is continuous for most of the eruption's duration. Eruptions usually start without warning, although minor spitting may occur a little or immediately beforehand. Eruptions conclude with steam mixed with liquid spray. Between eruptions, minor spitting lasting 1 to 2 seconds may occur. Rarely, a minor eruption may occur involving about 10 to 15 seconds of hesitating, moderately low spouting and splashing.

Although it is overshadowed in eruptive height and power by Great Fountain Geyser, White Dome Geyser is a significant feature that was used as an emblem by the old Yellowstone Library and Museum Association, now the Yellowstone Association. The thermophilic bacterium Thermus aquaticus, important because it produces an enzyme used in polymerase chain reaction laboratory procedures central to modern molecular biology, was first isolated from Mushroom Pool, a non-erupting hot spring a few hundred feet from White Dome Geyser.

White Dome is the largest member of the White Dome Group, a cluster of features bisected by Firehole Lake Drive. The group includes at least five other geysers as well as non-erupting springs. Gemini Geyser, Crack Geyser, Pebble Geyser, Rejuvenated Geyser, and an unnamed geyser (UNNG-WDG-2) are across Firehole Lake Drive from White Dome, and can be observed from the parking area. These members of the White Dome Group vary in their activity. Gemini's last active phase was in 2014-2015. Crack, Pebble, and WDG-2 eruptions are rare. Rejuvenated Geyser entered an active phase from 2015 to the present.

White Dome Geyser media
Video of White Dome Geyser erupting

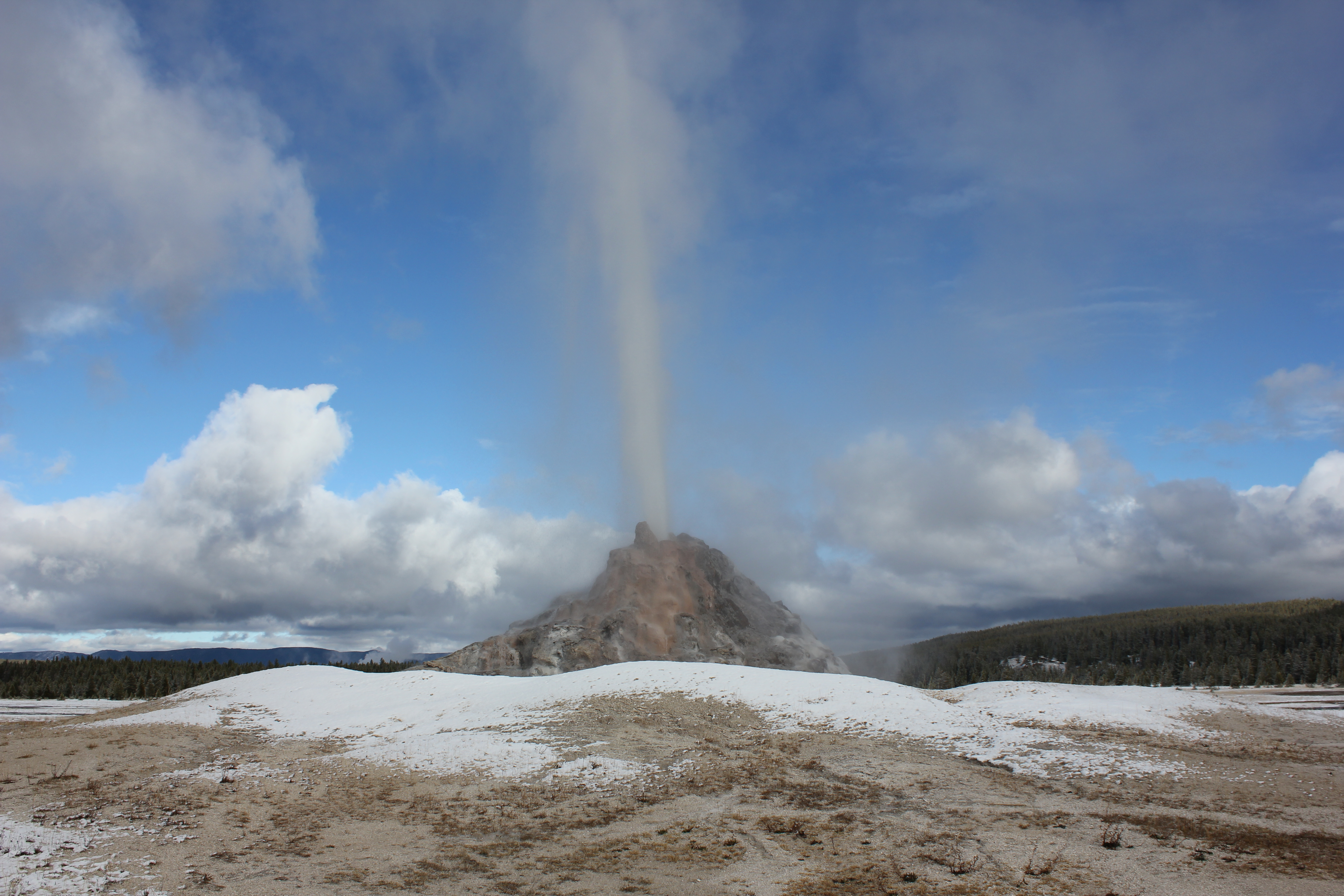
Erupting

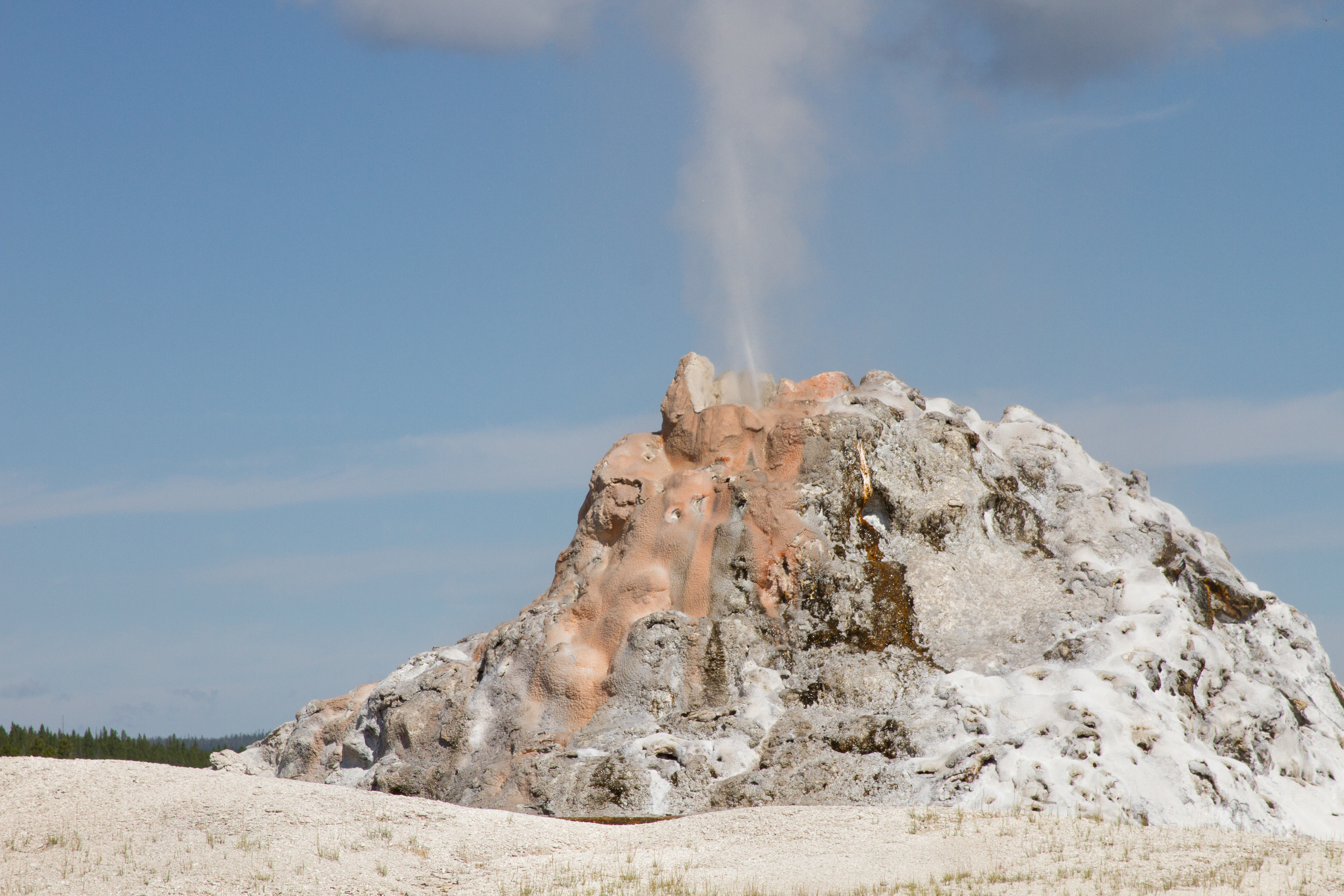
Close up of cone
