= Great Fountain Geyser =

Geyser located in the Lower Geyser Basin of Yellowstone National Park

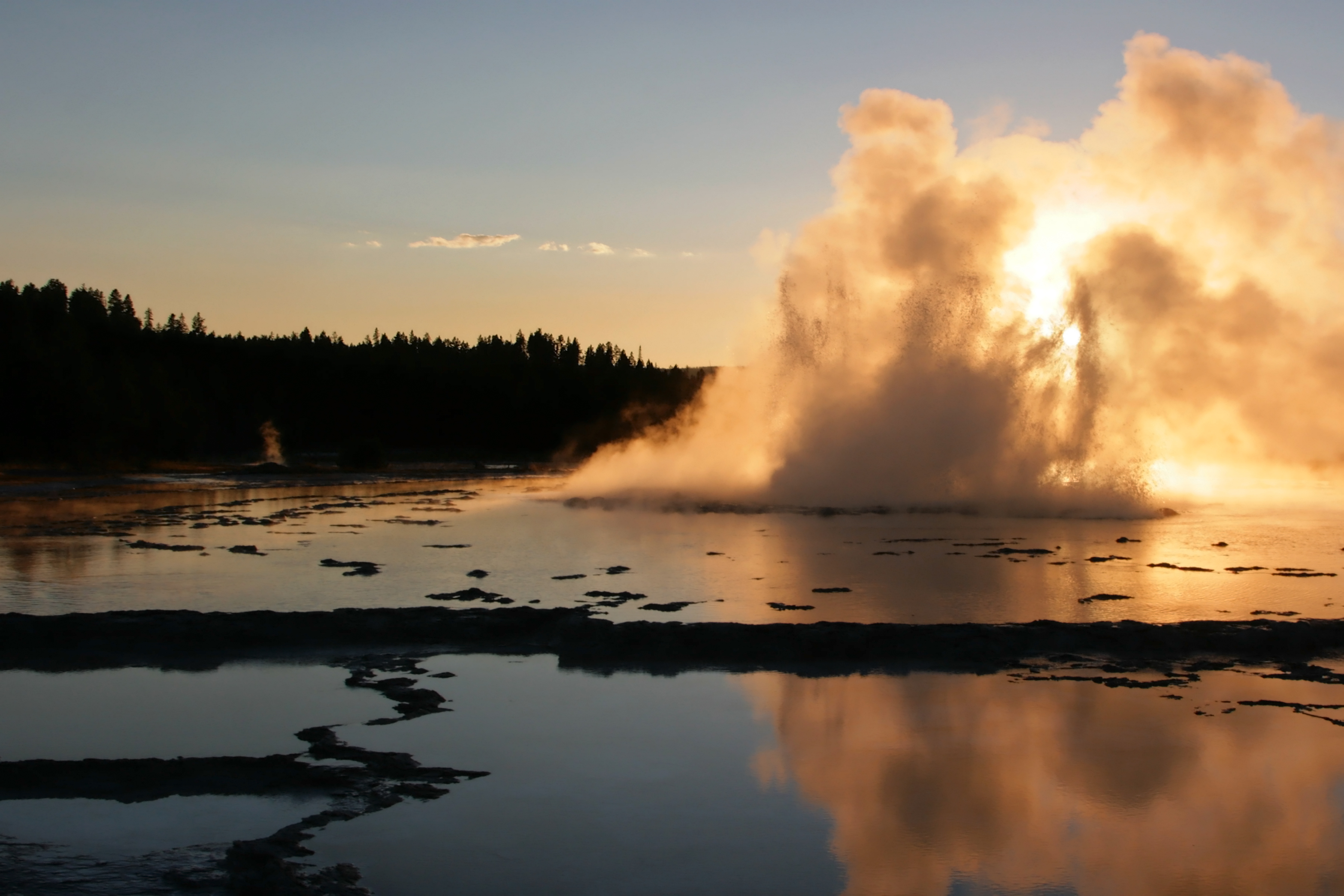
- Sunset eruption
- Interactive map of Great Fountain Geyser
- Location: Lower Geyser Basin, Yellowstone National Park, Wyoming
- Coordinates: 44.536424°N 110.7998826°W
- Elevation: 7,349 feet (2,240 m)
- Type: Fountain geyser
- Eruption height: 75 feet (23 m) to 220 feet (67 m)
- Frequency: 9 to 15 hours
- Duration: 1 hour (2 hours max)
- Temperature: 49 °C (120 °F)

The Great Fountain Geyser is a fountain-type geyser located in the Firehole Lake area of Lower Geyser Basin of Yellowstone National Park, Wyoming. It is the only Lower Geyser Basin feature that the park makes predictions for.

== Eruption ==
The geyser erupts every 9 to 15 hours. Great Fountain's maximum height ranges from about 75 feet (23 m) to over 220 feet (67 m). Its duration is usually about one hour but durations of over two hours have been seen. The duration of an eruption affects the interval that will elapse before the next eruption, so that if the duration of an eruption is recorded, the time of the following eruption can be predicted to a precision of about two hours. Around 1-2 hours the geyser overflows and drains until it gets so strong it reaches 1 meter and this is the start of the first burst. The prediction can be refined to plus or minus 15 minutes or so, through observation of overflow from the crater during the period between eruptions. While this pattern of behavior is observed most of the time, there are occasional episodes of so-called "wild-phase" activity during which the eruptions are of greatly extended duration and intervals between eruptions may be as long as three days. The geyser is then unpredictable until wild-phase activity ceases and more normal eruptions resume.

Nearby White Dome Geyser, which erupts considerably more frequently (albeit less powerfully) from a large geyserite cone, is easily seen from the same parking lot that affords a viewpoint for Great Fountain. The thermophilic bacterium Thermus aquaticus, important because it produces an enzyme used in polymerase chain reaction laboratory procedures central to modern molecular biology, was first isolated from Mushroom Pool, a non-eruptive hot spring a few hundred feet from White Dome Geyser.

Images of Great Fountain Geyser
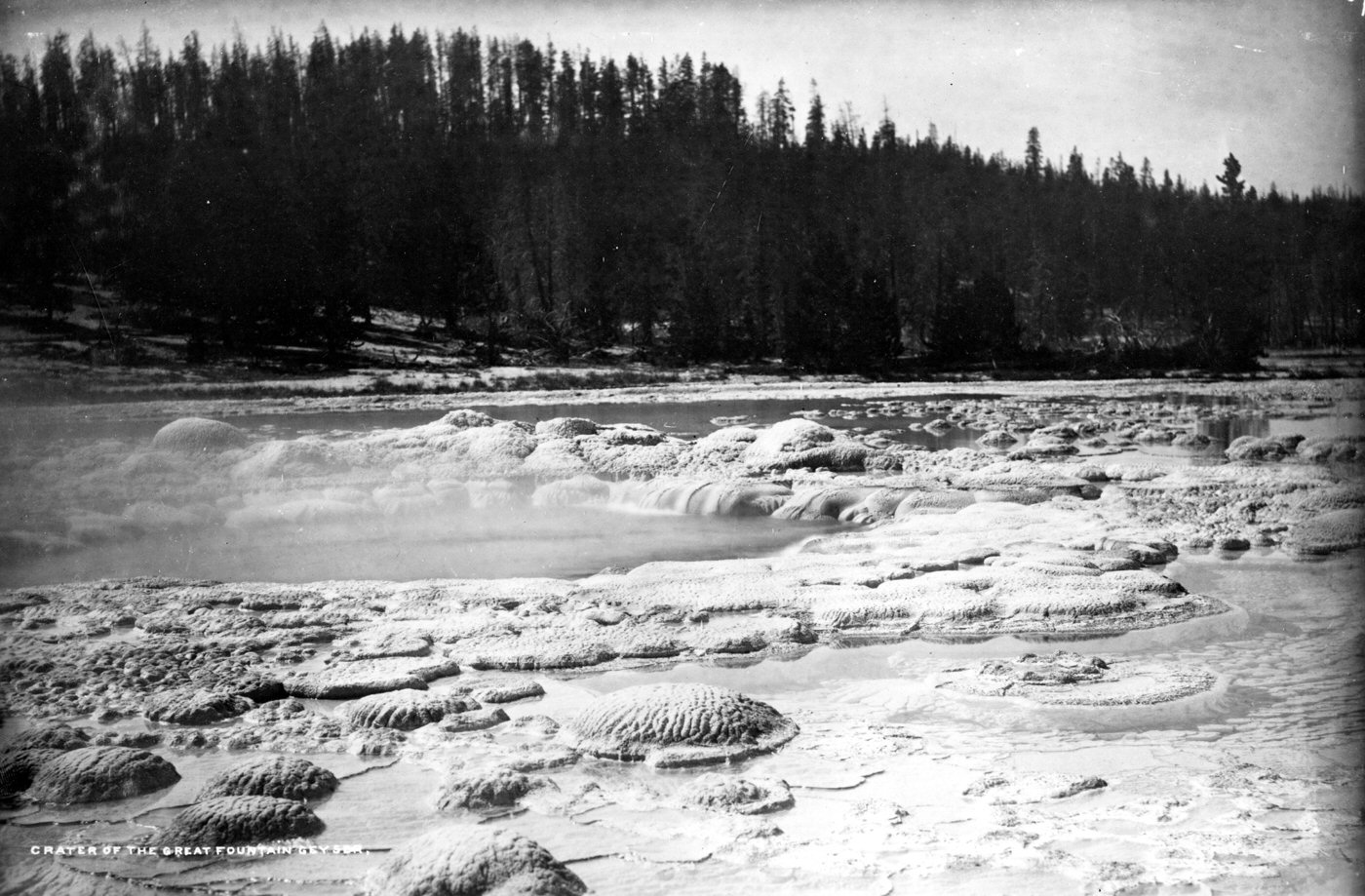
Crater, W.H. Jackson, 1883

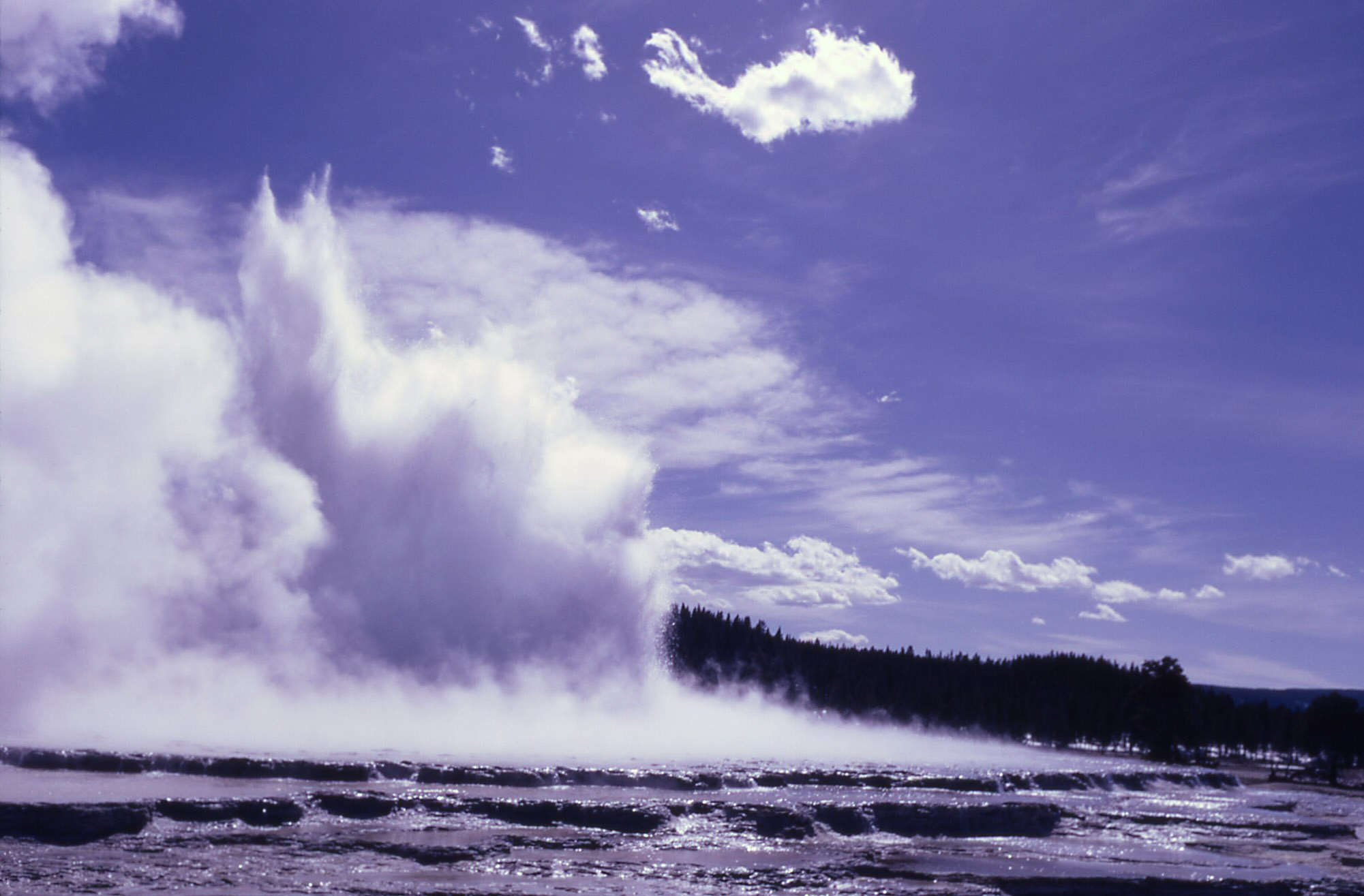
Eruption, 1967
