= Caldibacillus =

Scientific classification
- Domain: Bacteria
- Kingdom: Bacillati
- Phylum: Bacillota
- Class: Bacilli
- Order: Caryophanales
- Family: Bacillaceae
- Genus: Caldibacillus; Coorevits et al. 2012

Type species
- Caldibacillus debilis (Banat et al. 2004) Coorevits et al. 2012

Species
- Caldibacillus debilis; Caldibacillus hisashii; Caldibacillus kokeshiiformis; Caldibacillus lycopersici; Caldibacillus pasinlerensis; Caldibacillus thermolactis

Genus of bacteria

Caldibacillus is a facultative anaerobe genus of bacteria that stains Gram-positive (except for Caldibacillus debilis) from the family Bacillaceae. The type species of this genus is Caldibacillus debilis.

Members of Caldibacillus were previously species (except for the type species, Caldibacillus debilis) belonging to Bacillus, a genus that has been recognized as displaying extensive polyphyly and phylogenetic heterogeneity due to the vague criteria (such as the ability to form endospores in the presence of oxygen) previously used to assign species to this clade. Multiple studies using comparative phylogenetic analyses have been published in an attempt to clarify the evolutionary relationships between Bacillus species, resulting in the establishment of numerous novel genera such as Alkalihalobacillus, Brevibacillus, Solibacillus, Alicyclobacillus, Virgibacillus and Evansella. In addition, the genus Bacillus has been restricted to only include species closely related to Bacillus subtilis and Bacillus cereus.

The name Caldibacillus is derived from the prefix "-caldi" (from the Latin adjective caldus which translates to "warm, hot") and the suffix "-bacillus" (from the Latin noun bacillus, referring to a small staff or rod). Together, Caldibacillus translates to a warm bacillus, referring to the organism's thermophily.

== Biochemical characteristics and molecular signatures ==
Members of this genus are aerobic or facultatively anaerobic and found in mainly in saline lakes. All members can produce endospores and some are motile. Temperature range for growth is 25–70 °C. For some species optimum growth temperature is in the range 30–37 °C, while a few other species such as C. debilis and C. thermoamylovorans are obligate thermophiles with optimum growth temperatures of 65 and 50°C, respectively.

Genomic analyses identified eight conserved signature indels (CSIs) that are exclusively present in this genus in the following proteins: DHH family phosphoesterase, tRNA uridine-5- carboxymethylaminomethyl(34) synthesis enzyme MnmG, O-succinylbenzoate-CoA ligase, tetratricopeptide repeat protein, d-alanyl-d-alanine carboxypeptidase, ribonuclease Z, late competence protein ComER, and DNA polymerase III subunit delta. These CSIs provide a reliable molecular method of differentiating Caldibacillus species from other Bacillaceae genera and bacteria.

== Taxonomy ==
Caldibacillus, as of May 2021, contains a total of 6 species with validly published names. This genus was identified as a monophyletic clade and phylogenetically unrelated to other Bacillus species in studies examining the taxonomic relationships within Bacillus. This branching pattern is also observed in the Genome Taxonomy Database (GTDB).

Two non-validly published species, "Bacillus andreaoultii" and "Bacillus kwashiorkori", is also found to group with other members of Caldibacillus in phylogenetic trees as well as share the same molecular markers in the form of conserved signature indels (CSIs). However, its transfer was not officially proposed due to the lack of culture strain information. Further revision of this genus is required as additional genomes and novel species are discovered and assigned.

== Phylogeny ==
The currently accepted taxonomy is based on the List of Prokaryotic names with Standing in Nomenclature (LPSN) and National Center for Biotechnology Information (NCBI).

16S rRNA based LTP_10_2024

- - Caldifermentibacillus
    - "Caldibacillus thermoamylovorans"
    - C. hisashii
  - Pallidibacillus
    - P. pasinlerensis
    - - P. thermolactis kokeshiiformis
      - P. thermolactis

- - Perspicuibacillus lycopersici

- Caldibacillaceae
  - Caldibacillus debilis

120 marker proteins based GTDB 09-RS220

- Caldibacillaceae
  - Caldibacillus debilis (Banat et al. 2004) Coorevits et al. 2012
  - - - "Bacillus kwashiorkori" Seck et al. 2018
      - Perspicuibacillus lycopersici (Lin et al. 2015) Yang et al. 2023
    - - Fervidibacillus
      - - Caldifermentibacillus
          - "Bacillus andreraoultii" Traore et al. 2015
          - C. hisashii (Nishida et al. 2015) Yang et al. 2023 [incl. "Caldibacillus
            thermoamylovorans" (Combet-Blanc et al. 1995) Gupta et al. 2020]
        - Pallidibacillus
          - P. pasinlerensis (Baltaci et al. 2020) Yang et al. 2023
          - - P. thermolactis
              - P. t. kokeshiiformis (Poudel et al. 2014) Yang et al. 2023
              - P. t. thermolactis (Coorevits et al. 2011) Yang et al. 2023
