= Litchfieldia =

Scientific classification
- Domain: Bacteria
- Kingdom: Bacillati
- Phylum: Bacillota
- Class: Bacilli
- Order: Bacillales
- Family: Bacillaceae
- Genus: Litchfieldia; Gupta et al. 2020

Type species
- Litchfieldia alkalitelluris (Lee et al. 2008) Gupta et al. 2020

Species
- L. alkalitelluris; L. salsa

Genus of bacteria

Litchfieldia is a genus of Gram-positive rod-shaped bacteria in the family Bacillaceae within the order Bacillales. The type species for this genus is Litchfieldia alkalitelluris.

Litchfieldia is composed of species originally belonging to the genus Bacillus, a genus that displayed extensive polyphyly due to the vague criteria used to assign new species to the genus. Studies using phylogenetic and comparative genomic analyses have clarified the taxonomy of Bacillus by restricting the genus to only include species closely related to Bacillus subtilis and Bacillus cereus as well as transfer many species into new novel genera such as Virgibacillus, Solibacillus, Brevibacillus and Ectobacillus.

The name Litchfieldia was named after the American marine microbiologist and ecologist Dr. Carol D. Litchfield (1936–2012).

== Biochemical characteristics and molecular signatures ==
Members of the genus Litchfieldia are aerobic or facultatively anaerobic bacteria. They are all endospore-forming and motile cells. They are catalase-positive, oxidase-positive and slightly halophilic. They can grow in environments containing 0-4% (w/v) sodium chloride (NaCl), but grow best in 0-3% (w/v) NaCl. Grow also occurs at 10–40 °C (50–104 °F) (optimally at 30–35 °C (86–95 °F)) and pH 7.0–10.0 (optimally at pH 8.0–9.0).

Analyses of genome sequences from Litchfieldia species identified seven conserved signature indels that are unique for the genus Litchifieldia in the following proteins: MFS transporter, M15 family metallopeptidase, amidohydrolase, response regulator transcription factor, hypothetical proteins, and l-glutamate gamma-semialdehyde dehydrogenase. These molecular signatures provide a reliable way to distinguish members of this genus from other Bacillaceae genera and bacteria.

== Taxonomy ==
As of May 2021, there are a total of 2 species with validly published names in the genus Litchfieldia. Members of this genus group together to form a monophyletic branch in various phylogenetic trees constructed based on concatenated sequences from various protein datasets, as well as 16S ribosomal RNA sequences. This branching pattern was also reflected in the Genome Taxonomy Database.

There is one non-validly published species, Bacillus cheonanensis, that was also found to branch reliably with other members of the Litchfieldia clade as well as share the unique molecular markers. However, transfer was not proposed for this species due to the lack of culture strain information. Future analyses of this clade should be conducted when additional genome sequence and culture strain information becomes available.

== Phylogeny ==
16S rRNA based LTP_10_2024

- Cytobacillus~1
  - Cytobacillus luteolus (Shi et al. 2011) Gupta et al. 2020
  - Cytobacillus suaedae Xu et al. 2022

- Litchfieldia
  - L. alkalitelluris
  - L. salsa

120 marker proteins based GTDB 09-RS220

- - - Bacillus_BV
      - Litchfieldia luteola (Shi et al. 2011) Li et al. 2024
      - Litchfieldia suaedae (Xu et al. 2022) Li et al. 2024
  - - - Litchfieldia
        - L. alkalitelluris (Lee et al. 2008) Gupta et al. 2020
        - L. salsa corrig. (Amoozegar et al. 2013) Gupta et al. 2020
    - other
