= Peribacillus =

Scientific classification
- Domain: Bacteria
- Kingdom: Bacillati
- Phylum: Bacillota
- Class: Bacilli
- Order: Caryophanales
- Family: Bacillaceae
- Genus: Peribacillus; Patel and Gupta 2020

Type species
- Bacillaceae simplex (Priest, Goodfellow & Todd 1989) Patel & Gupta 2020

Species
- See text

Genus of bacteria

Peribacillus is a genus of rod-shaped bacteria that exhibits Gram-positive or Gram-variable staining that belongs in the family Bacillaceae within the order Bacillales. The type species for this genus is Peribacillus simplex.

Members of Peribacillus were originally part of the genus Bacillus, a large, phylogenetically complicated genus with unclear evolutionary relationships. The polyphyletic nature of the genus could be partially attributed to the vague criteria used to classify new species into this genus. To clarify the taxonomic relationships of Bacillus, multiple phylogenetic and comparative genomic analyses have been conducted, resulting in the transfer of many Bacillus species into novel genera such as Virgibacillus, Solibacillus, Brevibacillus and Ectobacillus. In addition, the genus was restricted to only include species closely related to Bacillus subtilis and Bacillus cereus.

The name Peribacillus is derived from its placement in phylogenetic trees. The prefix "peri-" comes from the Greek preposition peri, and translates to "about, around or nearby". Bacillus comes from the Latin noun bacillus, referring to both 'a small staff or rod' and Bacillus, the bacterial genus. Put together, the name Peribacillus refers to a genus around or nearby Bacillus.

== Biochemical characteristics and molecular signatures ==
Members of the genus Peribacillus are either aerobic or facultatively anaerobic and demonstrate endospore formation under adverse environmental or nutritional conditions. Most species have been isolated from either soil or human/animal guts. Peribacillus are usually motile, except in some cases when cells form and grow in chains. Peribacillus can survive in temperatures ranging from 3 °C to 45 °C, but optimal growth occurs in the range of 25-37 °C. Peribacillus butanolivorans is used in industrial processes, specifically in the remediation of butanol.

Genomic analyses have identified three conserved signature indels (CSIs) in the proteins HAMP domain-containing protein, phospho-N-acetylmuramoyl-pentapeptide-transferase and stage II sporulation protein E, which are specific for members of the genus Peribacillus and provide molecular means to distinguish members of this genus from other Bacillaceae genera and bacteria.

== Phylogeny ==
As of May 2021, there are a total of 17 species with validly published names in the genus Peribacillus. Members of this genus group together and forms a monophyletic branch in phylogenetic trees created from concatenated sequences from conserved proteins, 16S rRNA gene sequences as well as the phylogenetic tree in the Genome Taxonomy Database (GTDB).

Additional phylogenetic studies have identified a number of non-validly published species ("Bacillus cihuensis", "Bacillus massiliglaciei", "Bacillus massilioanorexius", "Bacillus massiliogorillae" and "Bacillus testis") that are considered to be members of this genus as they branch with other members of Peribacillus in phylogenetic trees and share the same unique molecular markers (specifically conserved signature indels). However, transfer of these species into Peribacillus was not proposed due to the lack of strain culture information demonstrating the need for future analyses of this clade as more information become available.

16S rRNA based LTP_10_2024

- - - - - Peribacillus~1
          - P. glennii
          - - P. cavernae
            - P. saganii
      - other
    - other
  - - - Peribacillus
        - P. tepidiphilus
        - - - P. acanthi
            - P. alkalitolerans
          - - - P. faecalis
              - - "P. massiliigorillae"
                - P. endoradicis (Zhang et al. 2012) Patel & Gupta 2020
            - - P. psychrosaccharolyticus
              - - - P. asahii
                  - - P. huizhouensis
                    - - P. gossypii (Kämpfer et al. 2015) Patel & Gupta 2020
                      - P. loiseleuriae
                - - P. muralis
                  - - - P. butanolivorans
                      - P. simplex
                    - - P. castrilensis Rodríguez et al. 2023
                      - P. frigoritolerans
    - - - Falsibacillus~
        - - Bacillus canaveralius
          - - Peribacillus~3
              - Peribacillus deserti
              - Peribacillus kribbensis
      - other

120 marker proteins based GTDB 09-RS220

- Peribacillus
  - - - P. tepidiphilus (Narsing Rao et al. 2021) Narsing Rao et al. 2023
      - - P. acanthi (Ma et al. 2018) Patel & Gupta 2020
        - P. alkalitolerans (Liu et al. 2018) Gupta et al. 2020
    - - "Bacillus testis" Cimmino et al. 2016
      - - P. faecalis Jiang et al. 2021
        - - "Bacillus massilioanorexius" Mishra et al. 2013
          - "P. massiliigorillae" (Keita et al. 2023) Dhulappa et al. 2023
  - - - P. deserti (Zhang et al. 2012) Patel & Gupta 2020
      - P. kribbensis (Lim et al. 2007) Patel & Gupta 2020
    - - P. saganii (Seuylemezian et al. 2020) Gupta et al. 2020
      - - - P. cavernae (Feng et al. 2016) Patel & Gupta 2020
          - P. glennii (Seuylemezian et al. 2020) Gupta et al. 2020
        - - - P. huizhouensis (Li et al. 2014) Patel & Gupta 2020 [incl. "Bacillus cihuensis" Liu et al. 2014]
            - P. loiseleuriae (Liu et al. 2016) Patel & Gupta 2020
          - - P. psychrosaccharolyticus (Priest et al. 1989) Patel & Gupta 2020
            - - - P. asahii (Yumoto et al. 2004) Patel & Gupta 2020
                - "P. massiliglaciei" Patel & Gupta 2020
              - - P. butanolivorans (Kuisiene et al. 2008) Patel & Gupta 2020
                - - P. muralis (Heyrman et al. 2005) Patel & Gupta 2020
                  - - P. frigoritolerans (Delaporte & Sasson 1967) Montecillo & Bae 2022
                    - P. simplex (Priest, Goodfellow & Todd 1989) Patel & Gupta 2020

Unassigned species:

- "P. aracenensis" Gutierrez-Albanchez et al. 2024

== See also ==
- List of Bacteria genera
- List of bacterial orders
