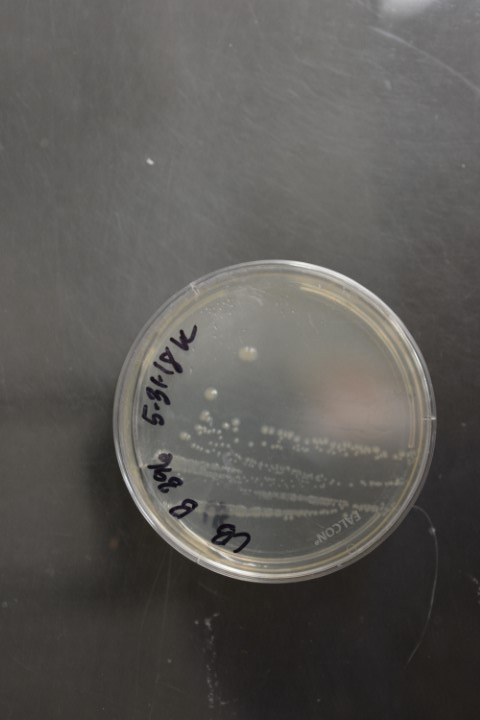
- Lederbergia lenta formerly Bacillus lentus on agar plate

Scientific classification
- Domain: Bacteria
- Kingdom: Bacillati
- Phylum: Bacillota
- Class: Bacilli
- Order: Bacillales
- Family: Heyndrickxiaceae
- Genus: Lederbergia; Gupta et al. 2020

Type species
- Lederbergia galactosidilytica corrig. (Heyndrickx et al. 2004) Gupta et al. 2020

Species
- L. citrea; L. citri; L. citrisecunda; L. galactosidilytica; L. graminis; L. lenta; L. panacisoli; L. ruris; L. wuyishanensis

= Lederbergia =

Genus of bacteria

Lederbergia is a genus of gram-positive or Gram-variable, rod-shaped bacteria in the family Bacillaceae within the order Bacillales. The type species for this genus is Lederbergia galactosidilyticus.

Lederbergia is composed of species originally belonging to the genus Bacillus, whose complicated evolutionary interspecies relationships has been long under scrutiny by the scientific community. The polyphyletic nature of the genus occurred as a result of the vague criteria used to assign species into the clade. Multiple studies focused on phylogenetic and comparative genomic analyses set out to clarify the taxonomy of the genus resulting in the restriction of the genus Bacillus to only include species closely related to Bacillus subtilis and Bacillus cereus as well as transfer many species into new novel genera such as Virgibacillus, Solibacillus, Brevibacillus and Ectobacillus.

The name Lederbergia was named after the American microbiologist Professor Esther Miriam Zimmer Lederberg (1922–2006) to celebrate her pioneering contributions to the fields of bacterial genetics and microbiology.

== Biochemical characteristics and molecular signatures ==
Members of the genus Lederbergia could be aerobic or facultatively anaerobic bacteria. They are all endospore-forming and generally motile cells. They are catalase-positive, oxidase-negative and urease-negative. Species can be found in milk, soil and digestive fauna. The optimal growth rate for members of this genus occurs in the range of 25–37 °C (77–99 °F).

Four conserved signature indels (CSIs) have been identified through genome sequence analysis as specific for the genus Lederbergia in proteins such as DEAD/DEAH box helicase, YidC family membrane integrase SpoIIIJ, peptide deformylase and NCS2 family permease. These CSIs provide a novel and reliable means to distinguish Lederbergia species from other Bacillaceae genera and bacteria in molecular terms.

== Taxonomy ==
As of May 2021, there are a total of 6 species with validly published names in the genus Lederbergia. In various phylogenetic trees constructed based on concatenated sequences from various protein datasets, as well as 16S rRNA, members of this genus formed a monophyletic branch, indicating their evolutionary relatedness. This branching pattern was also reflected in the Genome Taxonomy Database.

There is one non-validly published species, Bacillus niameyensis, that was also found to branch reliably with other members of the Lederbergia clade as well as share the unique molecular markers. However, transfer was not proposed for this species due to the lack of culture strain information, which demonstrates the importance of revisiting this genus later on for additional analyses when their genome sequence and culture strain information becomes available.

=== Phylogeny ===
16S rRNA based LTP_10_2024

- Lederbergia
  - - L. lenta corrig. (Gibson 1935) Gupta et al. 2020
    - - L. citrea Han et al. 2023
      - L. panacisoli (Choi & Cha 2014) Gupta et al. 2020
  - - L. graminis (Bibi et al. 2011) Gupta et al. 2020
    - - - L. galactosidilytica corrig. (Heyndrickx et al. 2004) Gupta et al. 2020
        - L. ruris (Heyndrickx et al. 2005) Gupta et al. 2020
      - - L. wuyishanensis (Liu et al. 2015) Gupta et al. 2020
        - - L. citri Liu et al. 2023
          - L. citrisecunda Liu et al. 2023

120 marker proteins based GTDB 09-RS220

- Lederbergia
  - - "Bacillus niameyensis" Tidjani Alou et al. 2015
    - - L. galactosidilytica
      - L. ruris
  - - - L. citrea
      - L. lenta
    - - L. panacisoli
      - - L. citri
        - - L. citrisecunda
          - L. wuyishanensis
