= Rossellomorea =

Scientific classification
- Domain: Bacteria
- Kingdom: Bacillati
- Phylum: Bacillota
- Class: Bacilli
- Order: Bacillales
- Family: Rossellomoreaceae
- Genus: Rossellomorea; Gupta et al. 2020

Type species
- Rossellomorea aquimaris (Yoon et al. 2003) Gupta et al. 2020

Species
- R. aquimaris; R. arthrocnemi; "R. enclensis"; R. marisflavi; "R. orangium"; R. oryzaecorticis; R. pakistanensis; R. vietnamensis

Genus of bacteria

Rossellomorea is a genus of Gram-positive or Gram-variable staining rod-shaped bacteria in the family Bacillaceae from the order Bacillales. The type species of this genus is Rossellomorea aquimaris.

Members of Rossellomorea are previously species belonging to Bacillus, a genus that has been recognized by the scientific community as displaying phylogenetic heterogeneity among its members. Multiple studies using comparative phylogenetic analyses have been published in an attempt to clarify the evolutionary relationships between Bacillus species, resulting in the establishment of numerous novel genera such as Alkalihalobacillus, Brevibacillus, Solibacillus, Alicyclobacillus, Virgibacillus and Evansella. In addition, the genus Bacillus has been restricted to only include species closely related to Bacillus subtilis and Bacillus cereus.

The name Rossellomorea was named after the Spanish microbiologist Professor Ramon Rossello-Móra, of the Universitat de les illes Balears, Spain, for his work on microbial diversity and systematics in diverse habitats and his contributions to these fields as editor of the journal of Systematic and Applied Microbiology.

== Biochemical characteristics and molecular signatures ==
Members of this genus are aerobic and found mainly in marine environments. All members can produce endospores are most are motile by means of a single polar flagellum or peritrichous flagella. Colonies are generally light-yellow in colour. Most species are catalase-positive and oxidase-negative. Rossellomorea can grow in temperatures ranging from 5 °C to 48 °C and generally also in the presence of 2–5% (w/v) NaCl. Most species are catalase-positive, oxidase-negative and moderately halophilic or halotolerant.

Analyses of genome sequences from Rossellomorea species identified three conserved signature indels (CSIs) for this genus in the proteins PBP1A family penicillin-binding protein, aminotransferase A and helicase-exonuclease AddAB subunit AddA, which in most cases are exclusively shared by either all or most members of this genus. These CSIs provide a reliable means to molecularly distinguish this genus from other Bacillaceae genera and bacteria.

== Taxonomy ==
Rossellomorea, as of May 2021, contains a total of 5 species with validly published names. This genus was identified as a monophyletic clade and phylogenetically unrelated to other Bacillus species in studies examining the taxonomic relationships within Bacillus. This branching pattern is also observed in the Genome Taxonomy Database (GTDB).

A non-validly published species, "Bacillus haikouensis" is also found to group with other members of Rossellomorea in phylogenetic trees as well as share the same molecular markers in the form of conserved signature indels (CSIs). However, its transfer was not officially proposed due to the lack of culture strain information and further analysis should be conducted when additional information becomes available.

=== Phylogeny ===
16S rRNA based LTP_10_2024

- Bacillaceae~8
  - - Bacillus salacetis Daroonpunt et al. 2019
    - - Rossellomorea pakistanensis (Roohi et al. 2014) Li et al. 2024
      - - Bacillus salis Seck et al. 2023
        - Bacillus seohaeanensis Lee et al. 2006
  - - Mangrovibacillus cuniculi
    - - Bacillus coahuilensis Cerritos et al. 2008
      - - Rossellomorea
          - R. marisflavi (Yoon et al. 2003) Gupta et al. 2020
          - - R. oryzaecorticis (Hong et al. 2014) Gupta et al. 2020
            - - "R. enclensis" (Dastager et al. 2014) Gupta et al. 2020
              - - R. aquimaris (Yoon et al. 2003) Gupta et al. 2020
                - - R. arthrocnemi Navarro-Torre et al. 2021
                  - R. vietnamensis (Noguchi et al. 2004) Gupta et al. 2020

120 marker proteins based GTDB 09-RS220

- Rossellomoreaceae
  - - Bacillus salacetis
    - Rossellomorea pakistanensis
  - - Rossellomorea
      - R. marisflavi
      - - - "Bacillus haikouensis" Li et al. 2014
          - "R. enclensis"
        - - R. aquimaris
          - - R. arthrocnemi
            - R. vietnamensis

- "R. orangium"
