= Ferdinandcohnia =

Scientific classification
- Domain: Bacteria
- Kingdom: Bacillati
- Phylum: Bacillota
- Class: Bacilli
- Order: Bacillales
- Family: Bacillaceae
- Genus: Ferdinandcohnia corrig. Gupta et al. 2020

Type species
- Ferdinandcohnia humi corrig. (Heyrman et al. 2005) Gupta et al. 2020

Species
- F. aciditolerans; F. humi; F. onubensis; "F. quinoae"; F. salidurans; "F. sinesaloumensis"

Synonyms
- Fredinandcohnia (sic) Gupta et al. 2020

Genus of rod-shaped bacteria

Ferdinandcohnia is a genus of rod-shaped bacteria that generally display Gram-positive staining in the family Bacillaceae within the order Bacillales. The type species for this genus is Ferdinandcohnia humi.

Ferdinandcohnia comprises species originally belonging to the genus Bacillus, whose polyphyletic nature has long been recognized as an issue by the scientific community. The vague nature of the criteria used to assign species into Bacillus resulted in a large genus full of unrelated organisms with a diverse range of biochemical characteristics. Multiple phylogenetic studies have been conducted to clarify the taxonomy of this genus, resulting in the transfer of many species into novel genera such as Virgibacillus, Solibacillus, Brevibacillus and Ectobacillus. Recently, Bacillus has been restricted only include species closely related to Bacillus subtilis and Bacillus cereus.

The name Ferdinandcohnia was chosen to celebrate the German biologist Professor Ferdinand Cohn (1828–1898), a founder of modern bacteriology and microbiology.

== Biochemical characteristics and molecular signatures ==
Members of the genus Ferdinandcohnia are mainly aerobic, but some species are facultatively anaerobic. Cells are all motile and endospore-forming. Most members are salt-tolerant and are able to grow in environments containing 0-5% (w/v) NaCl. Species can be found in a variety of environments, such as soil, rice fields, human stool, air in caves and hypersaline lakes. Ferdinandcohnia can survive in temperatures ranging from 5 °C to 47 °C, but optimal growth occurs in the range of 30-37 °C.

Analysis of genome sequences have identified eight conserved signature indels (CSIs) which are specific for the members of this genus. These conserved indels are present in the following proteins: triose-phosphate isomerase, ABC transporter ATP-binding protein, bis(5'-nucleosyl)-tetraphosphatase PrpE, 3-isopropylmalate dehydratase large subunit, GNAT family N-acetyltransferase, LTA synthase family protein, DNA-binding protein WhiA and nucleoside triphosphatase YtkD, and they provide reliable means to molecularly differentiate Ferdinandcohnia from other Bacillaceae genera and bacteria.

== Taxonomy ==
As of May 2021, there are a total of 4 species with validly published names in the genus Ferdinandcohnia. These members are found to group together on various phylogenetic trees created based on concatenated sequences from various datasets of conserved proteins and 16S rRNA genome sequences in a monophyletic branch. This clade is also found in the tree constructed in the Genome Taxonomy Database (GTDB).

In addition, 3 non-validly published species ("Bacillus nitroreducens", "Bacillus sinesaloumensis", and "Bacillus timonensis") are also found to group reliably with members of the Ferdinandcohnia genus, as well as share the same unique molecular markers. However transfer of these species into the genus was not proposed due to the lack of culture strain information. In order to ensure proper classification of these species as well as any future identified species, it is essential to revisit the classification criteria when the appropriate data becomes available for analysis.

== Phylogeny ==
16S rRNA based LTP_10_2024

- Ferdinandcohnia
  - - F. onubensis corrig. (Dominguez-Moñino et al. 2018) Gupta et al. 2020
    - F. salidurans corrig. (Son et al. 2019) Gupta et al. 2020
  - - F. aciditolerans corrig. (Ding et al. 2019) Gupta et al. 2020
    - - F. humi corrig. (Heyrman et al. 2005) Gupta et al. 2020
      - "F. sinesaloumensis" (Sarr et al. 2021) Dhulappa et al. 2023

120 marker proteins based GTDB 09-RS220

- Ferdinandcohnia
  - "F. sinesaloumensis"
  - - - F. aciditolerans
      - F. onubensis
    - - F. humi
      - "Bacillus timonensis" Kokcha et al. 2012
