= Siminovitchia =

Scientific classification
- Domain: Bacteria
- Kingdom: Bacillati
- Phylum: Bacillota
- Class: Bacilli
- Order: Bacillales
- Family: Heyndrickxiaceae
- Genus: Siminovitchia; Gupta et al. 2020

Type species
- Siminovitchia fordii (Scheldeman et al. 2004) Gupta et al. 2020

Species
- S. acidinfaciens; S. composti; S. farraginis; S. fordii; S. fortis; S. sediminis; S. terrae; S. thermophila

Genus of bacteria

Siminovitchia is a genus of Gram-Positive or Gram-negative rod-shaped bacteria in the family Bacillaceae from the order Bacillales. The type species of this genus is Siminovitchia fortii.

Members of Siminovitchia are previously species belonging to Bacillus, a genus that has been recognized as displaying extensive polyphyly and phylogenetic heterogeneity due to the vague criteria (such as the ability to form endospores in the presence of oxygen) previously used to assign species to this clade. Multiple studies using comparative phylogenetic analyses have been published in an attempt to clarify the evolutionary relationships between Bacillus species, resulting in the establishment of numerous novel genera such as Alkalihalobacillus, Brevibacillus, Solibacillus, Alicyclobacillus, Virgibacillus and Evansella. In addition, the genus Bacillus has been restricted to only include species closely related to Bacillus subtilis and Bacillus cereus.

The name Siminovitchia was named after the Canadian geneticist Professor Louis Siminovitch (University of Toronto), for his work on the discovery of bacteriophage lysogeny and for his seminal contributions on advancement of the field of Medical Genetics in Canada.

== Biochemical Characteristics and Molecular Signatures ==
Members of this genus are aerobic and found in locations such as soil and dairy farms. All members can produce endospores and most are motile by means of peritrichous flagella. Members are generally catalase and oxidase positive. The optimal growth conditions for Siminovitchia occur in the temperature range 30-37 °C and at pH 6.0–8.0.

Analyses of Siminovitchia genome sequences identified seven conserved signature indels (CSIs) for this genus in the proteins DNA repair protein RecN, amidophosphoribosyltransferase, UDP-N-acetylmuramate dehydrogenase, 50S ribosomal protein L11 methyltransferase, iron-sulphur cluster-binding protein and alanine racemase, which in most cases are exclusively shared by either all or most members of this genus. These molecular signatures serve as identifying characteristics for this genus and provide a method to reliably differentiate them from other Bacillaceae genera and bacteria.

== Taxonomy ==
Siminovitchia, as of May 2021, contains a total of 8 species with validly published names. This genus was identified as a monophyletic clade and phylogenetically unrelated to other Bacillus species in studies examining the taxonomic relationships within Bacillus. This branching pattern is also observed in the Genome Taxonomy Database (GTDB).

One non-validly published species, "Bacillus freudenreichii", is also found to group with other members of Siminovitchia in phylogenetic trees as well as share the same molecular markers in the form of conserved signature indels (CSIs). However, its transfer was not officially proposed due to the lack of culture strain information. Further revision of this genus is required as additional genomes and novel species are discovered and assigned.

== Phylogeny ==
16S rRNA based LTP_10_2024

- Siminovitchia
  - - S. farraginis Scheldeman et al. 2004
    - S. thermophila (Yang et al. 2013) Gupta et al. 2020
  - - - S. composti (Yang et al. 2013) Gupta et al. 2020
      - S. sediminis (Yu et al. 2014) Gupta et al. 2020
    - - - S. acidinfaciens (Sun et al. 2019) Gupta et al. 2020
        - S. fortis (Scheldeman et al. 2004) Gupta et al. 2020
      - - S. fordii (Scheldeman et al. 2004) Gupta et al. 2020
        - S. terrae (Díez-Méndez et al. 2017) Gupta et al. 2020

120 marker proteins based GTDB 09-RS220

- Siminovitchia
  - S. thermophila
  - - S. acidinfaciens
    - - S. fordii
      - - S. fortis
        - - Bacillus norwichensis Pallen 2024
          - S. terrae
