= Robertmurraya =

Scientific classification
- Domain: Bacteria
- Kingdom: Bacillati
- Phylum: Bacillota
- Class: Bacilli
- Order: Caryophanales
- Family: Bacillaceae
- Genus: Robertmurraya; Gupta et al. 2020

Type species
- Robertmurraya kyonggiensis Gupta et al. 2020

Species
- R. andreesenii; R. beringensis; R. dakarensis"; R. korlensis; R. kyonggiensis; "R. mangrovi"; R. massiliosenegalensis; R. siralis; R. yapensis

Genus of bacteria

Robertmurraya is a genus of mostly Gram-Positive rod-shaped bacteria in the family Bacillaceae from the order Bacillales. The type species of this genus is Robertmurraya siralis.

Members of Robertmurraya are previously species belonging to Bacillus, a genus that has been recognized as displaying extensive polyphyly and phylogenetic heterogeneity within its members. Multiple studies have been published in an attempt to clarify the evolutionary relationships between Bacillus species, resulting in the establishment of numerous novel genera such as Alkalihalobacillus, Brevibacillus, Solibacillus, Alicyclobacillus, Virgibacillus and Evansella. In addition, the genus Bacillus has been emended to only include species closely related to Bacillus subtilis and Bacillus cereus.

The name Robertmurraya was named after the Canadian microbiologist Dr Robert G. E. Murray, University of Western Ontario, for his contributions and leadership in the field of bacterial taxonomy.

== Biochemical Characteristics and Molecular Signatures ==
Members of this genus are aerobic and found in locations such as sand soil and human stool. All members can produce endospores, oxidase positive and catalase positive (with the exception of Robertmurraya massiliosenegalensis). The optimal growth temperature for Robertmurraya is in the range of 30-37°C. Analyses of genome sequences from Robertmurraya species have identified three conserved signature indels (CSIs) in the following proteins: hypothetical protein, sugar binding transcriptional regulator and asparagine synthase (glutamine-hydrolysing), and in most cases are exclusively shared by either all or most members of this genus. These molecular signatures provide a reliable molecular means to distinguish members of this genus from other Bacillaceae genera and bacteria.

== Taxonomy ==
Robertmurraya, as of May 2021, contains a total of 10 species with validly published names. This genus was identified as a monophyletic clade and phylogenetically unrelated to other Bacillus species in studies examining the taxonomic relationships within Bacillus. This branching pattern is also observed in the Genome Taxonomy Database (GTDB).

Three non-validly published species, "Bacillus coreaensis", "Bacillus dakarensis" and "Bacillus yapensis", are also found to group with other members of Robertmurraya in phylogenetic trees as well as share the same molecular markers in the form of conserved signature indels (CSIs). However, their transfer was not officially proposed due to the lack of culture strain information indicating the need for future revision of this genus as additional genomes and novel species are discovered and assigned.

=== Phylogeny ===
16S rRNA based LTP_10_2024

- Robertmurraya
  - R. kyonggiensis Gupta et al. 2020
  - R. siralis (Pettersson et al. 2000) Gupta et al. 2020

- Robertmurraya~
  - - R. beringensis (Yu et al. 2012) Gupta et al. 2020
    - R. korlensis (Zhang et al. 2009) Gupta et al. 2020
  - - R. massiliosenegalensis (Ramasamy et al. 2016) Gupta et al. 2020
    - - R. andreesenii (Kosowski et al. 2014) Gupta et al. 2020
      - R. crescens (Shivani et al. 2015) Gupta et al. 2020

120 marker proteins based GTDB 09-RS220

- Robertmurraya
  - R. korlensis
  - - "R. dakarensis" (Senghor et al. 2017) Gupta 2023
    - - R. andreesenii
      - - - R. kyonggiensis
          - "R. yapensis" (Xu et al. 2020) Gupta 2023 non Hitch et al. 2024
        - - R. massiliosenegalensis
          - R. siralis
