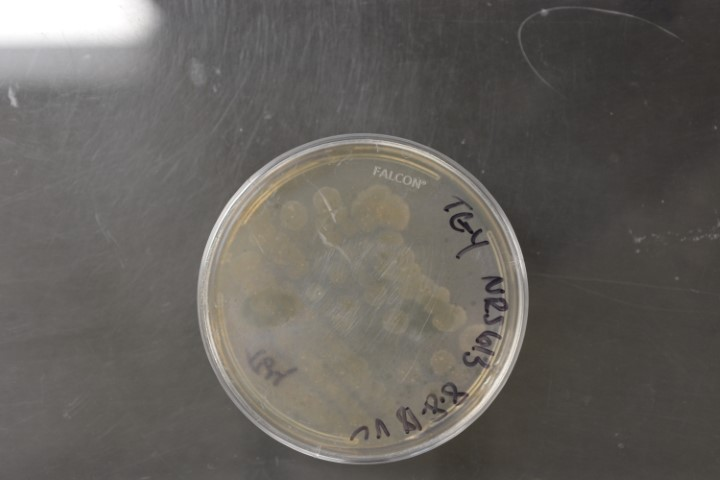
- Cytobacillus firmus formerly Bacillus firmus on agar plate

Scientific classification
- Domain: Bacteria
- Kingdom: Bacillati
- Phylum: Bacillota
- Class: Bacilli
- Order: Caryophanales
- Family: Bacillaceae
- Genus: Cytobacillus; Patel and Gupta 2020

Type species
- Cytobacillus firmus (Bredemann & Werner 1933) Patel & Gupta 2020

Species
- See text

= Cytobacillus =

Genus of rod-shaped bacteria

Cytobacillus is a genus of rod-shaped bacteria that stain either Gram-positive or Gram-variable in the family Bacillaceae within the order Bacillales. The type species for this genus is Cytobacillus firmus.

Members of this genus was transferred from the Bacillus genus after comparative genomics studies have determined they were sufficiently different by phylogenetic measures than Bacillus subtilis, the type species of the genus Bacillus. The genus Bacillus has long been under close scrutiny by the scientific community due to its polyphyletic nature, displaying many distinct monophyletic groupings in various phylogenetic trees within the genus. In addition, while Bacillus species have a diverse range of biochemical characteristics, there is no unique characteristic that can be used to reliably distinguish all Bacillus species from other bacteria. Many studies have used phylogenetic and comparative genomic analyses as a means towards clarifying the complicated taxonomic relationships within Bacillus, resulting in the transfer of many species into novel genera such as Alkalihalobacillus, Virigibacillus, Brevibacillus, Solibacillus and Evansella. In addition, the genus Bacillus has been restricted to include only species closely related to Bacillus subtilis and Bacillus cereus.

The name Cytobacillus can be broken down into the prefix "cyto-" (from the Greek noun kytos, referring to hollow, vessel, jar or a cell in biology) and the suffix "-bacillus" (from the Latin noun bacillus, referring to a small staff or rod and Bacillus, the bacterial genus). Together, Cytobacillus refers to a rod-shaped cell.

== Biochemical characteristics and molecular signatures ==
Members of Cytobacillus can be either aerobic or facultatively anaerobic. All studied species of this genus has been observed to produce endospores under adverse environmental or nutritional conditions. Cytobacillus can be isolated and found a diverse range of locations, ranging from natural locations (soil, marine sediments), living organisms (human gut, earthworm) to pharmaceutical production sites. Most species are motile, and some are able to tolerate moderate saline conditions and high alkalinity environments. While Cytobacillus species can grow in temperatures ranging from 10–45°C, optimum growth occurs in the range 25–37°C.

Three conserved signature indels (CSIs) have been identified as exclusively shared by most/all members of Cytobacillus in the following proteins: PDZ domain-containing protein, histidinol dehydrogenase and transcription-repair coupling factor. These CSIs were identified through the analysis of genome sequences from Cytobacillus species and provide novel molecular means to differentiate this genus from other Bacillaceae genera.

== Taxonomy ==
As of May 2021, there are a total of 13 species with validly published names in the genus Cytobacillus. Members of Cytobacillus are observed to group together in a monophyletic clade in phylogenetic trees created based on different datasets of conserved proteins as well as 16S rRNA genome sequences. This branching pattern is also observed in the Genome Taxonomy Database (GTDB).

In addition to these species with published names, several non-validly published species (‘Bacillus dabaoshanensis', ‘Bacillus dafuensis’, ‘Bacillus massiliogabonensis’, and ‘Bacillus mesophilum') been observed to branch with other Cytobacillus species and share molecular markers (in the form of conserved signature indels) exclusively unique for this genus. However the lack of culture strain information prevented the transfer of these species into the genus. As genome and strain information becomes available, it is necessary to conduct additional analyses of these classifications to account for any required amendments.

=== Phylogeny ===
16S rRNA based LTP_10_2024

- - - Cytobacillus~2, 3, 4
      - - C. eiseniae
        - - "C. massiliigabonensis"
          - - C. praedii
            - C. solani
      - - - C. depressus
          - C. formosensis (Lin et al. 2015) Patel & Gupta 2020
        - - - C. kochii
            - - C. horneckiae
              - C. purgationiresistens
          - - C. spongiae Gao et al. 2023
            - - C. citreus
              - "C. dafuensis"
  - - Cytobacillus gottheilii
    - - Bacillus infantis Ko et al. 2006
      - - Cytobacillus
          - C. oceanisediminis
          - - C. firmus
            - C. pseudoceanisediminis

120 marker proteins based GTDB 09-RS220

- Cytobacillus
  - - - C. gottheilii (Seiler et al. 2013) Patel & Gupta 2020
      - "Bacillus mesophilum" Manickam et al. 2014 non Zhou et al. 2017
    - - - C. horneckiae (Vaishampayan et al. 2010) Patel & Gupta 2020
        - C. purgationiresistens (Vaz-Moreira et al. 2012) Patel & Gupta 2020
      - - C. kochii (Seiler et al. 2012) Patel & Gupta 2020
        - C. stercorigallinarum Pallen 2024
  - - - C. oceanisediminis (Zhang et al. 2010) Patel & Gupta 2020
      - - Bacillus globisporus Larkin & Stokes 1967
        - - C. firmus (Bredemann & Werner 1933) Patel & Gupta 2020
          - C. pseudoceanisediminis Tarasov et al. 2023
    - - - C. depressus (Wei et al. 2016) Patel & Gupta 2020
        - - C. citreus Liu et al. 2023
          - "C. dafuensis" (Zheng et al. 2023) Liu et al. 2023
      - - C. eiseniae (Hong et al. 2012) Patel & Gupta 2020
        - - "C. massiliigabonensis" (Sarr et al. 2021) Liu et al. 2023
          - - C. praedii (Liu et al. 2017) Patel & Gupta 2020
            - C. solani (Liu et al. 2015) Patel & Gupta 2020
