= Gottfriedia =

Scientific classification
- Domain: Bacteria
- Kingdom: Bacillati
- Phylum: Bacillota
- Class: Bacilli
- Order: Bacillales
- Family: Bacillaceae
- Genus: Gottfriedia; Gupta et al. 2020

Type species
- Gottfriedia luciferensis b(Logan et al. 2002) Gupta et al. 2020

Species
- G. acidiceleris; G. endophytica; G. luciferensis; G. solisilvae

Genus of bacteria

Gottfriedia is a genus of gram-positive or Gram-variable rod-shaped bacteria in the family Bacillaceae within the order Bacillales. The type species for this genus is Gottfriedia luciferensis.

Members of Gottfriedia were transferred from the polyphyletic genus Bacillus, whose complicated interspecies taxonomy arose as a result of vague criteria used to assign novel bacteria into the genus. The extensive polyphyly of the genus has been recognized as an issue by the scientific community, resulting in the publication of multiple phylogenetic studies in an effort to clarify the taxonomy of this genus. As a result, Bacillus has been restricted only include species closely related to Bacillus subtilis and Bacillus cereus, and many species were transferred into novel genera such as Virgibacillus, Solibacillus, Brevibacillus and Ectobacillus.

The name Gottfriedia was chosen to celebrate the German scientist and naturalist Christian Gottfried Ehrenberg (1795–1876), who initially proposed the name Bacillus for rod-shaped and to recognize his contributions to the studies of microscopic organisms.

== Biochemical Characteristics and Molecular Signatures ==
Members of the genus Gottfriedia are either aerobic or facultatively anaerobic. All species are endospore-forming and some are motile. Gottfriedia can survive in temperatures ranging from 15 to 45 °C (59 to 113 °F), but optimal growth occurs in the range of 30–40 °C (86–104 °F).

14 CSIs have been identified for this genus in the proteins ABC transporter substrate-binding protein, helicase-exonuclease subunit AddAB subunit AddA, MFS transporter, 3-oxoacid CoA-transferase subunit B, LTA synthase family protein, sulphate ABC transporter permease subunit CysW, class I SAM-dependent RNA methyltransferase, site-specific tyrosine recombinase XerD, 3-isopropylmalate dehydrogenase, 5-oxoprolinase subunit PxpB, MATE family efflux transporter, ABC transporter permease, MBL fold metallo-hydrolase and YitT family protein and is in most cases shared by all members of this genus. These molecular signatures were identified through analyses of genome sequences from Gottfriedia species and provide a reliable way to demarcate members of this genus from other Bacillaceae genera and bacteria.

== Taxonomy ==
As of May 2021, there are a total of three species with validly published names in the genus Gottfriedia. Members of this clade are found to form a monophyletic branch in various phylogenetic trees created based on concatenated sequences from various datasets of conserved proteins and 16S ribosomal RNA genome sequences. The branching pattern of this clade is also reflected in the Genome Taxonomy Database.

=== Phylogeny ===
16S rRNA based LTP_10_2024

- Gottfriedia
  - G. endophytica corrig. Chhetri, Kim & Seo 2023
  - - G. acidiceleris corrig. (Peak et al. 2007) Gupta et al. 2020
    - - G. luciferensis(Logan et al. 2002) Gupta et al. 2020
      - G. solisilvae (Pan et al. 2017) Gupta et al. 2020

120 marker proteins based GTDB 09-RS220

- Gottfriedia
  - G. endophytica
  - - G. solisilvae
    - - G. acidiceleris
      - G. luciferensis
