= Sediminibacillus halophilus =

Scientific classification
- Domain: Bacteria
- Kingdom: Bacillati
- Phylum: Bacillota
- Class: Bacilli
- Order: Bacillales
- Family: Bacillaceae
- Genus: Sediminibacillus
- Species: S. halophilus

Binomial name
- Sediminibacillus halophilus Carrasco et al. 2008

Type strain
- CCM 7364, CECT 7148, CGMCC 1.6199, DSM 18088, EN8d

Species of bacterium

Sediminibacillus halophilus is a Gram-positive, oxidase positive, catalase negative, moderately halophilic, rod-shaped and motile bacterium from the genus of Sediminibacillus which has been isolated from sediments from the Lake Erliannor from the Mongolia. S.I. Paul et al. (2021) isolated and biochemically characterized Sediminibacillus halophilus (strains CS26, CS39, WS5) from marine sponges of the Saint Martin's island of the Bay of Bengal, Bangladesh.
