= R. G. E. Murray =

English-Canadian bacteriologist (1919–2022)

- Born: 19 May 1919; Ruislip, West London
- Died: 18 February 2022 (aged 102); London, Ontario, Canada
- Education: Graduate; B.A. in Pathology and Bacteriology; M.D.
- Alma mater: Summer Fields in Oxford; Christ's College, Cambridge; McGill University
- Occupation: Bacteriologist

Robert George Everitt Murray OC FRSC (19 May 1919, Ruislip, West London, England – 18 February 2022, London, Ontario, Canada) was an English-Canadian bacteriologist. He is known for his research on bacterial structure and pathology, as well as bacterial taxonomy.

== Biography ==
His father was Everitt George Dunne Murray (1890–1964), who was a professor of bacteriology at Montreal's McGill University from 1930 to 1955. After his childhood years in England and attending boarding school at Summer Fields in Oxford, R. G. E. Murray moved with his family in 1930 to Montreal. He studied at McGill University from 1936 to 1938. He returned to England and graduated from Christ's College, Cambridge in 1941 with a B.A. in pathology and bacteriology.

In 1941 R. G. E. Murray was accepted as a medical student at McGill University. In late October 1941 he embarked upon a 3-week voyage in convoy to Canada. He graduated from McGill University in late 1943 with an M.D. and completed his medical internship in 1944, at the Royal Victoria Hospital, Montreal. In 1944 he married Dorothy Marchand, whom he met in 1938, in Salisbury Cove, Maine at a summer course in invertebrate zoology. For less than a year from 1944 to 1945, he served as a captain in the Royal Canadian Army Medical Corps.

In the department of bacteriology and immunology of the University of Western Ontario Medical School (now part of the Schulich School of Medicine & Dentistry), he became a lecturer in 1945 and was promoted to full professor in 1949. From 1949 to 1974 he was head of the department. As head, he introduced electron microscopy into the department in 1954 and enabled the department to gain an international reputation in bacterial research. He retired as professor emeritus in 1984. From 1948 to 1965 he was chief of the microbiology service of Victoria Hospital in London, Ontario.

Murray chaired from 1951 to 1952 the founding committee for the Canadian Society of Microbiologists and from 1951 to 1952 served as the founding president of the society. From 1954 to 1960 he was the founding editor of the Canadian Journal of Microbiology. For the academic year 1972–1973 he was the president of the American Society for Microbiology. From 1991 to 1994 he was the editor-in-chief of the International Journal of Systematic Bacteriology.

His father, E. G. D. Murray, was from 1936 to 1964 a member of the board of trustees of Bergey's Manual. After his father's death in 1964, R. G. E. Murray joined the board of trustees and chaired the board from 1976 to 1990.

R. G. E. Murray was among the first bacteriologists to advocate that prokaryotes should be "given the rank of superkingdom". He gained an international reputation for his research in bacteriology, including the cytology, structure, function, systematics, and taxonomy of bacteria. He used electron microscopy and biochemical analysis to elucidate bacterial structures, notably S-layers in various bacterial species.

He was elected in 1957 a Fellow of the Royal Society of Canada (RSC). He received in 1984 the RSC's Flavelle Medal. The Canadian Journal of Microbiology dedicated the April 1988 issue to Murray in recognition of his scientific contributions. He was awarded in 1994 the Bergey Medal for bacterial taxonomy by the board of trustees of Bergey's Manual. He was appointed an Officer of the Order of Canada in 1998. He received honorary D.Sc. degrees from four universities.

Murray's first wife, Dorothy née Marchand, predeceased him after 40 years of marriage. They had two sons and a daughter. Murray was also predeceased by his second wife, Marion née Luney, after 28 years of marriage. He was predeceased by one of his two sons. He was survived by a son, a daughter, six grandchildren, and two great-grandchildren.

== Eponynms ==
- Robertmurraya, genus in the family Bacillaceae
- Deinococcus murrayi, an extremely radiation-resistant bacterial species

== Selected publications ==
- Murray, R. G. E.; Pearce, R. H. (1949). "The Detection and Assay of Hyaluronidase by Means of Mucoid Streptococci". Canadian Journal of Research. 27e (5): 254–264. doi:10.1139/cjr49e-035. PMID 24536906.
- Loeb, L. J.; Moyer, A.; Murray, R. G. E. (1950). "An Antibiotic Produced by Micrococcus Epidermidis". Canadian Journal of Research. 28e (5): 212–216. doi:10.1139/cjr50e-029. PMID 24538862.
- Murray, R. G. E.; Francombe, W. H.; Mayall, B. H. (1959). "The Effect of Penicillin on the Structure of Staphylococcal Cell Walls". Canadian Journal of Microbiology. 5 (6): 641–648. doi:10.1139/m59-078. PMID 14425445.
- Murray, R. G. E.; Steed, Pamela; Elson, H. E. (1965). "The Location of the Mucopeptide in Sections of the Cell Wall of Escherichia Coli and Other Gram-Negative Bacteria". Canadian Journal of Microbiology. 11 (3): 547–560. doi:10.1139/m65-072. PMID 14346132.
- Maier, S.; Murray, R. G. E. (1965). "The Fine Structure of Thioploca Ingrica and a Comparison with Beggiatoa". Canadian Journal of Microbiology. 11 (4): 645–655. doi:10.1139/m65-087. PMID 5861285.
- Murray, E. G. D.; Ghosh, B. K.; Murray, R. G. E. (1966). "The Interaction of Guanofuracin and Listeria Monocytogenes". Canadian Journal of Microbiology. 12 (2): 285–297. doi:10.1139/m66-039. PMID 4959244.
- Burdett, I. D. J.; Murray, R. G. E. (1974). "Electron Microscope Study of Septum Formation in Escherichia coli Strains B and B/R During Synchronous Growth". Journal of Bacteriology. 119 (3): 1039–1056. doi:10.1128/jb.119.3.1039-1056.1974. PMC 245711. PMID 4604418.
- Gibbons, N. E.; Murray, R. G. E. (1978). "Proposals Concerning the Higher Taxa of Bacteria". International Journal of Systematic Bacteriology. 28: 1–6. doi:10.1099/00207713-28-1-1.
- Gibbons, N. E.; Murray, R. G. E. (1978). "Validation of Cyanobacteriales Stanier in Gibbons and Murray 1978 as a New Order of the Kingdom Procaryotae Murray 1968, and of the Use of Neuter Plural Endings for Photobacteria and Scotobacteria classes nov. Gibbons and Murray 1978: Request for an Opinion". International Journal of Systematic Bacteriology. 28 (2): 332–333. doi:10.1099/00207713-28-2-332.
- Thompson, B. G.; Murray, R. G. E. (1981). "Isolation and characterization of the plasma membrane and the outer membrane of Deinococcus radiodurans strain Sark". Canadian Journal of Microbiology. 27 (7): 729–734. doi:10.1139/m81-111. PMID 7296407.
- Brooks, B. W.; Murray, R. G. E. (1981). "Nomenclature for "Micrococcus radiodurans" and Other Radiation-Resistant Cocci: Deinococcaceae fam. Nov. And deinococcus gen. nov., Including Five Species". International Journal of Systematic Bacteriology. 31 (3): 353–360. doi:10.1099/00207713-31-3-353.
- Beveridge, T. J.; Meloche, J. D.; Fyfe, W. S.; Murray, R. G. E. (1983). "Diagenesis of Metals Chemically Complexed to Bacteria: Laboratory Formation of Metal Phosphates, Sulfides, and Organic Condensates in Artificial Sediments". Applied and Environmental Microbiology. 45 (3): 1094–1108. Bibcode:1983ApEnM..45.1094B. doi:10.1128/aem.45.3.1094-1108.1983. PMC 242412. PMID 16346230.
- Palmer, F. E.; Staley, J. T.; Murray, R. G. E.; Counsell, T.; Adams, J. B. (1986). "Identification of manganese‐oxidizing bacteria from desert varnish". Geomicrobiology Journal. 4 (4): 343–360. doi:10.1080/01490458609385943.
- Counsell, T. J.; Murray, R. G. E. (1986). "Polar Lipid Profiles of the Genus Deinococcus". International Journal of Systematic Bacteriology. 36 (2): 202–206. doi:10.1099/00207713-36-2-202.
- Murray, R G. E.; Kosaric, N.; Cairns, W. L.; Varangu, L. K.; Mahoney, E. M. (1987). "The Effect of Calcium on Microbial Aggregation during UASB Reactor Start-Up". Water Science and Technology. 19 (1–2): 249–260. doi:10.2166/wst.1987.0206.
- Stackebrandt, E.; Murray, R. G. E.; Truper, H. G. (1988). "Proteobacteria classis nov., a Name for the Phylogenetic Taxon That Includes the "Purple Bacteria and Their Relatives"". International Journal of Systematic Bacteriology. 38 (3): 321–325. doi:10.1099/00207713-38-3-321.
- Murray, Robert G. E. (1992). "The Family Deinococcaceae". The Prokaryotes. pp. 3732–3744. doi:10.1007/978-1-4757-2191-1_42. ISBN 978-1-4757-2193-5.
- Murray, R. G. E.; Schleifer, K. H. (1994). "Taxonomic Notes: A Proposal for Recording the Properties of Putative Taxa of Procaryotes". International Journal of Systematic Bacteriology. 44 (1): 174–176. doi:10.1099/00207713-44-1-174. PMID 8123559.
- Murray, R. G. E.; Stackebrandt, E. (1995). "Taxonomic Note: Implementation of the Provisional Status Candidatus for Incompletely Described Procaryotes". International Journal of Systematic Bacteriology. 45 (1): 186–187. doi:10.1099/00207713-45-1-186. PMID 7857801.
- Murray, R. G. E. (1996). "Taxonomic Note: A Rule about the Deposition of Type Strains". International Journal of Systematic Bacteriology. 46 (3): 831. doi:10.1099/00207713-46-3-831.
- Murray, R. G. E.; Robinow, Carl F. (2014). "Light Microscopy". Methods for General and Molecular Microbiology. pp. 5–18. doi:10.1128/9781555817497.ch1. ISBN 9781683671619.
- Beveridge, Terry J.; Lawrence, John R.; Murray, Robert G. E. (2014). "Sampling and Staining for Light Microscopy". Methods for General and Molecular Microbiology. pp. 19–33. doi:10.1128/9781555817497.ch2. ISBN 9781683671619.
