= Sediminibacillus albus =

Scientific classification
- Domain: Bacteria
- Kingdom: Bacillati
- Phylum: Bacillota
- Class: Bacilli
- Order: Bacillales
- Family: Bacillaceae
- Genus: Sediminibacillus
- Species: S. albus

Binomial name
- Sediminibacillus albus Wang et al. 2009

Type strain
- CGMCC 1.6502, CIP 110033, DSM 19340, NHBX5

Species of bacterium

Sediminibacillus albus is a Gram-positive, moderately halophilic, strictly aerobic, endospore-forming and rod-shaped bacterium from the genus of Sediminibacillus which has been isolated from sediments from the Lake Nanhuobuxun in China.
