= Sediminibacillus massiliensis =

Scientific classification
- Domain: Bacteria
- Kingdom: Bacillati
- Phylum: Bacillota
- Class: Bacilli
- Order: Caryophanales
- Family: Bacillaceae
- Genus: Sediminibacillus
- Species: S. massiliensis

Binomial name
- Sediminibacillus massiliensis Senghor et al. 2017

Type strain
- CSUR P3518

Species of bacterium

Sediminibacillus massiliensis is a Gram-positive, moderately halophilic, aerobic, rod-shaped and motile bacterium from the genus of Sediminibacillus which has been isolated from human faeces from Dielmo in Senegal.
