= Filobacillus milensis =

Scientific classification
- Domain: Bacteria
- Kingdom: Bacillati
- Phylum: Bacillota
- Class: Bacilli
- Order: Bacillales
- Family: Bacillaceae
- Genus: Filobacillus
- Species: F. milensis

Binomial name
- Filobacillus milensis corrig. Schlesner et al. 2001

Species of bacterium

Filobacillus milensis is a species of halophilic spore-forming bacteria, the type and only current species of its genus. Its cells are motile, strictly aerobic rods which stain Gram-negative. Its type strain is SH 714^{T} (= DSM 13259^{T} = ATCC 700960^{T}).
