= Bacillaceae-1 RNA motif =

Bacillaceae-1 RNA
- Consensus secondary structure of Bacilliceae-1 RNAs

Identifiers
- Symbol: Bacillaceae-1
- Rfam: RF01690

Other data
- Domain: bacillaceae
- PDB structures: PDBe

The Bacillaceae-1 RNA motif is a conserved RNA structure identified by bioinformatics within bacteria in the family bacillaceae. The RNA is presumed to operate as a non-coding RNA, and is sometimes adjacent to operons containing ribosomal RNAs. The most characteristic feature is two terminal loops that have the nucleotide consensus RUCCU, where R is either A or G. The motif might be related to the Desulfotalea-1 RNA motif, as the motifs share some similarity in conserved features, and the Desulfotalea-1 RNA motif is also sometimes adjacent to ribosomal RNA operons.
