= Alkalilactibacillus ikkensis =

Scientific classification
- Domain: Bacteria
- Kingdom: Bacillati
- Phylum: Bacillota
- Class: Bacilli
- Order: Bacillales
- Family: Bacillaceae
- Genus: Alkalilactibacillus
- Species: A. ikkensis

Binomial name
- Alkalilactibacillus ikkensis Schmidt et al. 2016

Type strain
- GCM68

Synonyms
- Alkalilactibacillus ikkense

Species of bacterium

Alkalilactibacillus ikkensis is a Gram-positive and endospore-forming bacterium from the genus of Alkalilactibacillus.
