= Calditerricola satsumensis =

Scientific classification
- Domain: Bacteria
- Kingdom: Bacillati
- Phylum: Bacillota
- Class: Bacilli
- Order: Caryophanales
- Family: Bacillaceae
- Genus: Calditerricola
- Species: C. satsumensis

Binomial name
- Calditerricola satsumensis Moriya et al. 2011

Type strain
- ATCC BAA-1462, DSM 45223, JCM 14719, YMO81

Synonyms
- Caldaterra satsumae

Species of bacterium

Calditerricola satsumensis is an extreme thermophilic, Gram-negative, aerobic and non-spore-forming bacterium from the genus of Calditerricola which has been isolated from high-temperature compost from Kagoshima in Japan.
