= Alteribacter =

Scientific classification
- Domain: Bacteria
- Kingdom: Bacillati
- Phylum: Bacillota
- Class: Bacilli
- Order: Bacillales
- Family: Bacillaceae
- Genus: Alteribacter; Gupta et al. 2020

Type species
- Alteribacter auranticus (Borsodi et al. 2008) Gupta et al. 2020

Species
- A. auranticus; A. keqinensis; A. lacisalsi; A. natronophilus; A. populi

Genus of bacteria

Alteribacter is a genus of Gram-positive or Gram-variable, rod-shaped bacteria in the family Bacillaceae within the order Bacillales. The type species for this genus is Alteribacter auranticus.

Alteribacter is composed of species originally belonging to the genus Bacillus, a large genus that displays extensive polyphyly among its members. The polyphyletic nature of this genus has long been recognized by the scientific community, and occurred partly due to the vague criteria used to assign species into this genus. For example, many phylogenetically unrelated species possess the ability to form endospores under aerobic conditions, yet this criterion was deemed sufficient for inclusion into the genus Bacillus. In order to clarify the complex taxonomic interrelationships of this genus, multiple studies focused on phylogenetic and comparative genomic analyses have restricted Bacillus to only include species closely related to Bacillus subtilis and Bacillus cereus as well as transferred many species into new novel genera such as Virgibacillus, Solibacillus, Brevibacillus and Ectobacillus.

The name Alteribacter is derived from the prefix "alter-" (which comes from the Latin adjective alter, and translates to "another") and the suffix "-bacter" (which comes from the Latin noun bacter, referring to a rod). Put together, the name Alteribacter refers to another rod.

== Biochemical characteristics and molecular signatures ==
Members of the genus Alteribacter are aerobic, endospore-forming, non-motile cells. The bacterial colonies they form are generally yellowish/goldish-orange in colour and are catalase-positive and oxidase-negative. Species can be found in Hungarian soda lakes and the rhizosphere soil of Populus euphratica tree in the Taklamakan desert. Alteribacter can survive in temperatures ranging from 10°C to 45°C, but optimal growth occurs in the range of 25-28°C.

Analyses of genome sequences from Bacillaceae species have identified five conserved signature indels (CSIs) that are uniquely present in members of the Alteribacter genus in the proteins phosphatidylserine decarboxylase, tRNA pseudouridine (38-40) synthase TruA, competence/damage-inducible protein A, NO-inducible flavohemoprotein and ABC transporter substrate-binding protein. These CSIs provide a method of differentiation in molecular terms to demarcate Alteribacter from other Bacillaceae genera and bacteria.

== Taxonomy ==
As of May 2021, there are a total of 3 species with validly published names in the genus Alteribacter. From comparative genomic studies, species belonging to Alteribacter were found to exclusively share a number of conserved signature indels (a type of molecular marker) as well as form a monophyletic branch within various phylogenetic trees, indicating their unrelatedness to other Bacillus species. This branching pattern was also reflected in the Genome Taxonomy Database (GTDB). Together, these findings led to the transfer of these species into Alteribacter.

There is one non-validly published species, 'Bacillus lacisalsi", that was also found to branch reliably with other members of the Alteribacter clade as well as share the unique molecular markers. However, transfer was not proposed for this species due to the lack of culture strain information. It is important to continually monitor and update these classifications as new Bacillus species are identified and their genome sequence and culture strain information becomes available.

== Phylogeny ==
16S rRNA based LTP_10_2024

- Alteribacter
  - A. populi (Liu et al. 2018) Gupta et al. 2020
  - - A. natronophilus (Menes et al. 2020) Gupta et al. 2020
    - - A. lacisalsi (Dong et al. 2021) Narsing Rao et al. 2022
      - - A. auranticus (Borsodi et al. 2008) Gupta et al. 2020
        - A. keqinensis Liu et al. 2022

120 marker proteins based GTDB 09-RS220

- Alteribacter
  - A. populi
  - - - A. auranticus
      - A. keqinensis ["Alteribacter salitolerans" Wang et al. 2022]
    - - A. lacisalsi
      - A. natronophilus

== See also ==
- List of Bacteria genera
- List of bacterial orders
