= Edaphobacillus =

Scientific classification
- Domain: Bacteria
- Kingdom: Bacillati
- Phylum: Bacillota
- Class: Bacilli
- Order: Bacillales
- Family: Bacillaceae
- Genus: Edaphobacillus; Lal et al. 2013

Type species
- Edaphobacillus lindanitolerans Lal et al. 2013

Species
- E. lindanitolerans

Genus of bacteria

Edaphobacillus is a Gram-positive, aerobic, non-spore-forming and non-motile genus of bacteria from the family of Bacillaceae with one known species (Edaphobacillus lindanitolerans).

== See also ==
- List of bacterial orders
- List of bacteria genera
