= Sinibacillus =

Scientific classification
- Domain: Bacteria
- Kingdom: Bacillati
- Phylum: Bacillota
- Class: Bacilli
- Order: Bacillales
- Family: Bacillaceae
- Genus: Sinibacillus; Yang and Zhou 2014

Type species
- Sinibacillus soli Yang & Zhou 2014

Species
- S. soli

Genus of bacteria

Sinibacillus is a genus of bacteria from the family of Bacillaceae with one known species (Sinibacillus soli).

== See also ==
- List of Bacteria genera
- List of bacterial orders
