= Calculibacillus =

Scientific classification
- Domain: Bacteria
- Kingdom: Bacillati
- Phylum: Bacillota
- Class: Bacilli
- Order: Bacillales
- Family: Bacillaceae
- Genus: Calculibacillus; Min et al. 2021

Type species
- Calculibacillus koreensis Min et al. 2021

Species
- C. koreensis

Genus of bacteria

Calculibacillus is a Gram-positive, non-spore-forming and strictly anaerobic genus of bacteria from the family Bacillaceae with one known species (Calculibacillus koreensis). Calculibacillus koreensis has been isolated from sediments of a coal mine in Taebaek.
