= Calditerricola =

Scientific classification
- Domain: Bacteria
- Kingdom: Bacillati
- Phylum: Bacillota
- Class: Bacilli
- Order: Bacillales
- Family: Bacillaceae
- Genus: Calditerricola; Moriya et al. 2011

Type species
- Calditerricola satsumensis Moriya et al. 2011

Species
- C. satsumensis; C. yamamurae

Synonyms
- Caldaterra Moriya et al. 2006

Genus of bacteria

Calditerricola is an extremely thermophilic genus of bacteria from the family Bacillaceae.

== Phylogeny ==
The currently accepted taxonomy is based on the List of Prokaryotic names with Standing in Nomenclature (LPSN) and National Center for Biotechnology Information (NCBI).

16S rRNA based LTP_10_2024

- Calditerricola
  - C. satsumensis Moriya et al. 2011
  - C. yamamurae Moriya et al. 2011

120 marker proteins based GTDB 09-RS220

- Calditerricola
  C. satsumensis
