= Texcoconibacillus =

Scientific classification
- Domain: Bacteria
- Kingdom: Bacillati
- Phylum: Bacillota
- Class: Bacilli
- Order: Bacillales
- Family: Bacillaceae
- Genus: Texcoconibacillus; Ruiz-Romero et al. 2013

Type species
- Texcoconibacillus texcoconensis Ruiz-Romero et al. 2013

Species
- T. texcoconensis

Genus of bacteria

Texcoconibacillus is a genus of bacteria from the family of Bacillaceae with one known species (Texcoconibacillus texcoconensis). Texcoconibacillus texcoconensis has been isolated from the lake Texcoco in Mexico.

== See also ==
- List of Bacteria genera
- List of bacterial orders
