= Saliterribacillus =

Scientific classification
- Domain: Bacteria
- Kingdom: Bacillati
- Phylum: Bacillota
- Class: Bacilli
- Order: Bacillales
- Family: Bacillaceae
- Genus: Saliterribacillus; Amoozegar et al. 2013

Type species
- Saliterribacillus persicus Amoozegar et al. 2013

Species
- S. persicus

Genus of bacteria

Saliterribacillus is a genus of bacteria from the family of Bacillaceae with one known species (Saliterribacillus persicus). Saliterribacillus persicus has been isolated from the Aran-Bidgol lake in Iran.

== See also ==
- List of Bacteria genera
- List of bacterial orders
