= Natribacillus =

Scientific classification
- Domain: Bacteria
- Kingdom: Bacillati
- Phylum: Bacillota
- Class: Bacilli
- Order: Bacillales
- Family: Bacillaceae
- Genus: Natribacillus; Echigo et al. 2012

Type species
- Natribacillus halophilus Echigo et al. 2012

Species
- N. halophilus

Genus of bacteria

Natribacillus is a Gram-positive, moderately halophilic, alkalitolerant, spore-forming, aerobic and motile genus of bacteria from the family of Bacillaceae with one known species (Natribacillus halophilus). Natribacillus halophilus has been isolated from garden soil from Okabe in Japan.

== See also ==
- List of Bacteria genera
- List of bacterial orders
