= Aureibacillus =

Scientific classification
- Domain: Bacteria
- Kingdom: Bacillati
- Phylum: Bacillota
- Class: Bacilli
- Order: Bacillales
- Family: Bacillaceae
- Genus: Aureibacillus; Liu et al. 2015

Type species
- Aureibacillus halotolerans Liu et al. 2015

Species
- A. halotolerans

Genus of bacteria

Aureibacillus is a Gram-positive, strictly aerobic, rod-shaped, spore-forming and motile genus of bacteria from the family of Bacillaceae with one known species (Aureibacillus halotolerans). Aureibacillus halotolerans has been isolated from sediments of the northern Okinawa Trough.
