= Swionibacillus =

Scientific classification
- Domain: Bacteria
- Kingdom: Bacillati
- Phylum: Bacillota
- Class: Bacilli
- Order: Bacillales
- Family: Bacillaceae
- Genus: Swionibacillus; Li et al. 2017

Type species
- Swionibacillus sediminis Li et al. 2017

Species
- S. sediminis

Genus of bacteria

Swionibacillus is a Gram-negative, strictly aerobic and non-motile genus of bacteria from the family of Bacillaceae with one known species (Swionibacillus sediminis). Swionibacillus sediminis has been isolated from marine sediments from the south-west Indian Ocean.
