= Fermentibacillus =

Scientific classification
- Domain: Bacteria
- Kingdom: Bacillati
- Phylum: Bacillota
- Class: Bacilli
- Order: Bacillales
- Family: Bacillaceae
- Genus: Fermentibacillus; Hirota, Aino & Yumoto 2016

Type species
- Fermentibacillus polygoni Hirota, Aino & Yumoto 2016

Species
- F. polygoni

Genus of bacteria

Fermentibacillus is an alkaliphilic genus of bacteria from the family of Bacillaceae with one known species (Fermentibacillus polygoni).

== See also ==
- List of Bacteria genera
- List of bacterial orders
