= Streptohalobacillus =

Scientific classification
- Domain: Bacteria
- Kingdom: Bacillati
- Phylum: Bacillota
- Class: Bacilli
- Order: Bacillales
- Family: Bacillaceae
- Genus: Streptohalobacillus; Wang, Xue & Ma 2011

Type species
- Streptohalobacillus salinus Wang, Xue & Ma 2011

Species
- S. salinus

Genus of bacteria

Streptohalobacillus is a genus of bacteria from the family of Bacillaceae with one known species (Streptohalobacillus salinus). Streptohalobacillus salinus has been isolated from soil from the Qaidam Basin in China

== See also ==
- List of Bacteria genera
- List of bacterial orders
