= Lottiidibacillus =

Scientific classification
- Domain: Bacteria
- Kingdom: Bacillati
- Phylum: Bacillota
- Class: Bacilli
- Order: Bacillales
- Family: Lottiidibacillaceae
- Genus: Lottiidibacillus; Liu et al. 2020

Type species
- Lottiidibacillus patelloidae Liu et al. 2020

Species
- L. patelloidae

Genus of bacteria

Lottiidibacillus is a genus of bacteria from the family of Bacillaceae with one known species (Lottiidibacillus patelloidae). Lottiidibacillus patelloidae has been isolated from a sea snail (Patelloida saccharina lanx) from Xiamen.

== See also ==
- List of Bacteria genera
- List of bacterial orders
