= Alkalilactibacillus =

Scientific classification
- Domain: Bacteria
- Kingdom: Bacillati
- Phylum: Bacillota
- Class: Bacilli
- Order: Bacillales
- Family: Bacillaceae
- Genus: Alkalilactibacillus; Schmidt et al. 2016

Type species
- Alkalilactibacillus ikkensis

Species
- A. ikkensis

Genus of bacteria

Alkalilactibacillus is a genus of bacteria from the family of Bacillaceae.
