= Cerasibacillus =

Scientific classification
- Domain: Bacteria
- Kingdom: Bacillati
- Phylum: Bacillota
- Class: Bacilli
- Order: Bacillales
- Family: Bacillaceae
- Genus: Cerasibacillus; Nakamura et al. 2004

Type species
- Cerasibacillus quisquiliarum Nakamura et al. 2004

Species
- C. quisquiliarum; C. terrae

Genus of bacteria

Cerasibacillus is a moderately thermophilic, alkaliphilic, strictly aerobic, rod-shaped, spore-forming and motile genus of bacteria from the family of Bacillaceae with one known species (Cerasibacillus quisquiliarum).

== Phylogeny ==
The currently accepted taxonomy is based on the List of Prokaryotic names with Standing in Nomenclature (LPSN) and National Center for Biotechnology Information (NCBI).

16S rRNA based LTP_10_2024

- Cerasibacillus
  - C. quisquiliarum Nakamura et al. 2004
  - C. terrae Lin et al. 2020

120 marker proteins based GTDB 09-RS220

- Cerasibacillus
  - C. quisquiliarum Nakamura et al. 2004
  - C. terrae Lin et al. 2020

== See also ==
- List of Bacteria genera
- List of bacterial orders
