= Polygonibacillus =

Scientific classification
- Domain: Bacteria
- Kingdom: Bacillati
- Phylum: Bacillota
- Class: Bacilli
- Order: Bacillales
- Family: Bacillaceae
- Genus: Polygonibacillus; Hirota et al. 2016

Type species
- Polygonibacillus indicireducens Hirota et al. 2016

Species
- P. indicireducens

Genus of bacteria

Polygonibacillus is a genus of bacteria from the family of Bacillaceae with one known species (Polygonibacillus indicireducens).

== See also ==
- List of Bacteria genera
- List of bacterial orders
