= Aidingibacillus =

Scientific classification
- Domain: Bacteria
- Kingdom: Bacillati
- Phylum: Bacillota
- Class: Bacilli
- Order: Bacillales
- Family: Bacillaceae
- Genus: Aidingibacillus; Wang et al. 2021

Type species
- Aidingibacillus halophilus Wang et al. 2021

Species
- A. halophilus

Genus of bacteria

Aidingibacillus is a Gram-positive, aerobic non-spore-forming and non-motile genus of bacteria from the family of Bacillaceae with one known species (Aidingibacillus halophilus). Aidingibacillus halophilus has been isolated from a salt lake in China.

== See also ==
- List of Bacteria genera
- List of bacterial orders
