= Melghiribacillus =

Scientific classification
- Domain: Bacteria
- Kingdom: Bacillati
- Phylum: Bacillota
- Class: Bacilli
- Order: Bacillales
- Family: Bacillaceae
- Genus: Melghiribacillus; Addou et al. 2015

Type species
- Melghiribacillus thermohalophilus Addou et al. 2015

Species
- M. thermohalophilus

Genus of bacteria

Melghiribacillus is a Gram-positive, spore-forming and aerobic genus of bacteria from the family of Bacillaceae with one known species (Melghiribacillus thermohalophilus). Melghiribacillus thermohalophilus was isolated from soil from a salt lake from Chott Melghir.

== See also ==
- List of bacterial orders
- List of bacteria genera
