= Pueribacillus =

Scientific classification
- Domain: Bacteria
- Kingdom: Bacillati
- Phylum: Bacillota
- Class: Bacilli
- Order: Bacillales
- Family: Bacillaceae
- Genus: Pueribacillus; Wang et al. 2018

Type species
- Pueribacillus theae Wang et al. 2018

Species
- P. theae

Genus of bacteria

Pueribacillus is a Gram-positive, spore-forming, rod-shaped, aerobic and motile genus of bacteria from the family of Bacillaceae with one known species (Pueribacillus theae). Pueribacillus theae has been isolated from Pu'er tea.

== See also ==
- List of Bacteria genera
- List of bacterial orders
