= Aliibacillus =

Scientific classification
- Domain: Bacteria
- Kingdom: Bacillati
- Phylum: Bacillota
- Class: Bacilli
- Order: Bacillales
- Family: Bacillaceae
- Genus: Aliibacillus; Xu et al. 2019

Type species
- Aliibacillus thermotolerans Xu et al. 2019

Species
- A. thermotolerans

Genus of bacteria

Aliibacillus is a Gram-positive, moderately thermophilic, heterotrophic, rod-shaped and motile genus of bacteria from the family of Bacillaceae with one known species (Aliibacillus thermotolerans).

== See also ==
- List of Bacteria genera
- List of bacterial orders
