= Pradoshia =

Scientific classification
- Domain: Bacteria
- Kingdom: Bacillati
- Phylum: Bacillota
- Class: Bacilli
- Order: Bacillales
- Family: Bacillaceae
- Genus: Pradoshia; Saha et al. 2019

Type species
- Pradoshia eiseniae Saha et al. 2019

Species
- P. eiseniae

Genus of bacteria

Pradoshia is a Gram-positive and spore-forming genus of bacteria from the family Bacillaceae with one known species (Pradoshia eiseniae). Pradoshia eiseniae is capable to metabolize 3-nitropropionic acid. Pradoshia eiseniae has been isolated from the gut of the earthworm Eisenia fetida.
