= Desertibacillus =

Scientific classification
- Domain: Bacteria
- Kingdom: Bacillati
- Phylum: Bacillota
- Class: Bacilli
- Order: Bacillales
- Family: Bacillaceae
- Genus: Desertibacillus; Bhatt et al. 2017

Type species
- Desertibacillus haloalkaliphilus Bhatt et al. 2017

Species
- D. haloalkaliphilus

Genus of bacteria

Desertibacillus is a Gram-positive, non-endospore-forming and rod-shaped genus of bacteria from the family of Bacillaceae with one known species (Desertibacillus haloalkaliphilus). Desertibacillus haloalkaliphilus has been isolated from a saline desert from Little Rann of Kutch.

== See also ==
- List of Bacteria genera
- List of bacterial orders
