= Sediminibacillus =

Scientific classification
- Domain: Bacteria
- Kingdom: Bacillati
- Phylum: Bacillota
- Class: Bacilli
- Order: Bacillales
- Family: Bacillaceae
- Genus: Sediminibacillus; Carrasco et al. 2008

Type species
- Sediminibacillus halophilus Carrasco et al. 2008

Species
- S. albus; S. dalangtanensis; S. halophilus; "S. massiliensis"; S. terrae

Genus of bacteria

Sediminibacillus is a genus of bacteria from the family of Bacillaceae. Sediminibacillus species are halophilic bacteria and found in salty human stools and marine sponges. Sediminibacillus species are identified from Plakortis dariae sponge of the Saint Martin's island of the Bay of Bengal, Bangladesh.

== Phylogeny ==
The currently accepted taxonomy is based on the List of Prokaryotic names with Standing in Nomenclature (LPSN) and National Center for Biotechnology Information (NCBI).

16S rRNA based LTP_10_2024

- Sediminibacillus
  - S. albus Wang, Xue & Ma 2009
  - - S. terrae Wu et al. 2020
    - S. halophilus Carrasco et al. 2008

120 marker proteins based GTDB 09-RS220

- Sediminibacillus
  - "S. massiliensis" Senghor et al. 2017
  - - S. albus Wang, Xue & Ma 2009
    - - "Virgibacillus senegalensis"
      - - S. terrae Wu et al. 2020
        - - S. dalangtanensis Huang et al. 2022
          - S. halophilus Carrasco et al. 2008

== See also ==
- List of Bacteria genera
- List of bacterial orders
