= Vulcanibacillus =

Scientific classification
- Domain: Bacteria
- Kingdom: Bacillati
- Phylum: Bacillota
- Class: Bacilli
- Order: Bacillales
- Family: Bacillaceae
- Genus: Vulcanibacillus; L'Haridon et al. 2006

Type species
- Vulcanibacillus modesticaldus L'Haridon et al. 2006

Species
- V. modesticaldus

Genus of bacteria

Vulcanibacillus is a genus of bacteria from the family of Bacillaceae with one known species (Vulcanibacillus modesticaldus). Vulcanibacillus modesticaldus has been isolated from a hydrothermal vent from the Rainbow Vent Field.
