= Aquisalibacillus =

Scientific classification
- Domain: Bacteria
- Kingdom: Bacillati
- Phylum: Bacillota
- Class: Bacilli
- Order: Bacillales
- Family: Bacillaceae
- Genus: Aquisalibacillus; Márquez et al. 2008
- Species: A. elongatus

Binomial name
- Aquisalibacillus elongatus Márquez et al. 2008

Genus of bacteria

Aquisalibacillus is a moderately halophilic, rod-shaped and non-motile genus of bacteria from the family of Bacillaceae with one known species, Aquisalibacillus elongatus.
