= Amylobacillus =

Scientific classification
- Domain: Bacteria
- Kingdom: Bacillati
- Phylum: Bacillota
- Class: Bacilli
- Order: Bacillales
- Family: Bacillaceae
- Genus: Amylobacillus

Species
- "A. thermophilus"

Genus of bacteria

"Amylobacillus" is a genus of bacteria from the family of Bacillaceae with one known species (Amylobacillus thermophilus).
