= Jilinibacillus =

Scientific classification
- Domain: Bacteria
- Kingdom: Bacillati
- Phylum: Bacillota
- Class: Bacilli
- Order: Bacillales
- Family: Bacillaceae
- Genus: Jilinibacillus; Liu et al. 2015

Type species
- Jilinibacillus soli Liu et al. 2015

Species
- J. soli

Genus of bacteria

Jilinibacillus is a Gram-positive, aerobic, rod-shaped, endospore-forming and motile genus of bacteria from the family of Bacillaceae with one known species (Jilinibacillus soli). Jilinibacillus soli has been isolated from saline and alkali soil from Baicheng City.
