= Evansella clarkii =

Scientific classification
- Domain: Bacteria
- Kingdom: Bacillati
- Phylum: Bacillota
- Class: Bacilli
- Order: Bacillales
- Family: Salisediminibacteriaceae
- Genus: Evansella
- Species: E. clarkii

Binomial name
- Evansella clarkii (Nielsen et al. 1995) Gupta et al. 2020

Synonyms
- Bacillus clarkii Nielsen et al. 1995

Species of bacterium

Evansella clarkii is a species of Gram-positive, aerobic, rod-shaped, endospore-forming, alkaliphilic bacterium. It was originally described as Bacillus clarkii in 1995. The specific epithet clarkii honours American bacteriologist Francis E. Clark. The type strain is PN-102^{T} (= DSM 8720^{T} = ATCC 700162^{T} = LMG 17947^{T}).

In 2020, the species was transferred to the genus Evansella on the basis of phylogenomic and comparative genomic analyses.
