= Filobacillus =

Scientific classification
- Domain: Bacteria
- Kingdom: Bacillati
- Phylum: Bacillota
- Class: Bacilli
- Order: Bacillales
- Family: Bacillaceae
- Genus: Filobacillus; Schlesner et al. 2001

Type species
- Filobacillus milosensis corrig. Schlesner et al. 2001

Species
- F. milosensis

Genus of bacteria

Filobacillus is a genus of bacteria within the phylum Bacillota. It contains the type and only species, Filobacillus milensis, though other species and strains have been isolated. Species in this genus are generally halotolerant.

== See also ==
- List of bacterial orders
- List of bacteria genera
