= Natronobacillus =

Scientific classification
- Domain: Bacteria
- Kingdom: Bacillati
- Phylum: Bacillota
- Class: Bacilli
- Order: Bacillales
- Family: Bacillaceae
- Genus: Natronobacillus; Sorokin et al. 2009

Type species
- Natronobacillus azotifigens Sorokin et al. 2009

Species
- N. azotifigens

Genus of bacteria

Natronobacillus is a Gram-positive, moderately halophilic, alkalitolerant, aerobic, spore-forming and motile genus of bacteria from the family of Bacillaceae with one known species (Natronobacillus azotifigens). Natronobacillus azotifigens has been isolated from soil from Siberia.
