= Geomicrobium =

Scientific classification
- Domain: Bacteria
- Kingdom: Bacillati
- Phylum: Bacillota
- Class: Bacilli
- Order: Bacillales
- Family: Marinococcaceae
- Genus: Geomicrobium; Echigo et al. 2010

Type species
- Geomicrobium halophilum Echigo et al. 2010

Species
- G. halophilum; G. sediminis

Synonyms
- Geomicrobiium

Genus of bacteria

Geomicrobium is a moderately halophilic and alkaliphilic genus of bacteria from the family of Bacillaceae with one known species (Geomicrobium halophilum). Geomicrobium halophilum has been isolated from garden soil in Japan.

== Phylogeny ==
The currently accepted taxonomy is based on the List of Prokaryotic names with Standing in Nomenclature (LPSN) and National Center for Biotechnology Information (NCBI).

16S rRNA based LTP_10_2024

- - Geomicrobium sediminis Xiong et al. 2014
  - - Geomicrobium halophilum Echigo et al. 2010
    - other

120 marker proteins based GTDB 09-RS220

- - Geomicrobium sediminis
  - - Geomicrobium halophilum
    - other

== See also ==
- List of Bacteria genera
- List of bacterial orders
