= Thermicanus aegyptius =

Scientific classification
- Domain: Bacteria
- Kingdom: Bacillati
- Phylum: Bacillota
- Class: Bacilli
- Order: Paenibacillales
- Family: Paenibacillaceae
- Genus: Thermicanus
- Species: T. aegyptius

Binomial name
- Thermicanus aegyptius Gößner et al. 2000

Type strain
- ATCC 700890, DSM 12793, ET-5b

Species of bacterium

Thermicanus aegyptius is a microaerophile and thermophilic bacterium from the genus Thermicanus, which has been isolated from oxic soil in Egypt.
