= Aeribacillus =

Scientific classification
- Domain: Bacteria
- Kingdom: Bacillati
- Phylum: Bacillota
- Class: Bacilli
- Order: Bacillales
- Family: Bacillaceae
- Genus: Aeribacillus; Miñana-Galbis et al. 2010

Type species
- Aeribacillus pallidus (Scholz et al. 1988) Miñana-Galbis et al. 2010

Species
- A. alveayuensis; A. composti; A. kexueae; A. pallidus

Genus of bacteria

Aeribacillus is a genus in the phylum Bacillota (Bacteria).

== Etymology ==
The name Aeribacillus derives from: Latin noun aer aeris, air; Latin masculine gender noun bacillus, a small rod; Neo-Latin masculine gender noun Aeribacillus, aerobic small rod. The name Aeribacillus pallidus (Scholz et al. 1988) Miñana-Galbis et al. 2010, (Type species of the genus).; Latin masculine gender adjective pallidus, pale, pallid, referring to the pale colony colour.

== Phylogeny ==
The currently accepted taxonomy is based on the List of Prokaryotic names with Standing in Nomenclature (LPSN) and National Center for Biotechnology Information (NCBI).

16S rRNA based LTP_10_2024

- Aeribacillus
  - A. composti
  - A. pallidus (Scholz et al. 1988) Miñana-Galbis et al. 2010

120 marker proteins based GTDB 09-RS220

- Aeribacillus
  - A. kexueae (Sun et al. 2018) Li et al. 2024
  - - A. alveayuensis (Bae, Lee & Kim 2005) Li et al. 2024
    - A. composti Finore et al. 2017
