= Sinobaca =

Scientific classification
- Domain: Bacteria
- Kingdom: Bacillati
- Phylum: Bacillota
- Class: Bacilli
- Order: Bacillales
- Family: Bacillaceae
- Genus: Sinobaca; Sinobaca Li et al. 2008

Type species
- Sinobaca qinghaiensis (Li et al. 2006) Li, Zhi & Euzeby 2008

Species
- "S. beijingensis"; S. qinghaiensis

Synonyms
- Sinococcus

Genus of bacteria

Sinobaca is a genus of bacteria from the family of Bacillaceae with one known species (Sinobaca qinghaiensis).

== See also ==
- List of Bacteria genera
- List of bacterial orders
