= Radiobacillus =

Scientific classification
- Domain: Bacteria
- Kingdom: Bacillati
- Phylum: Bacillota
- Class: Bacilli
- Order: Bacillales
- Family: Bacillaceae
- Genus: Radiobacillus; Li et al. 2020

Type species
- Radiobacillus deserti Li et al. 2020

Species
- R. deserti; R. kanasensis

Genus of bacteria

Radiobacillus is a Gram-positive, UV-resistant, rod-shaped, aerobic, endospore-forming and non-motile genus of bacteria from the family of Bacillaceae with one known species (Radiobacillus deserti). Radiobacillus deserti has been isolated from sandy soil from the Taklimakan Desert.

== Phylogeny ==
The currently accepted taxonomy is based on the List of Prokaryotic names with Standing in Nomenclature (LPSN) and National Center for Biotechnology Information (NCBI).

16S rRNA based LTP_10_2024

- Radiobacillus
  - R. deserti Li et al. 2020
  - R. kanasensis Zhang et al. 2023

120 marker proteins based GTDB 09-RS220

- Radiobacillus
  R. deserti

== See also ==
- List of Bacteria genera
- List of bacterial orders
