= Brevibacillus borstelensis =

Scientific classification
- Domain: Bacteria
- Kingdom: Bacillati
- Phylum: Bacillota
- Class: Bacilli
- Order: Bacillales
- Family: Paenibacillaceae
- Genus: Brevibacillus
- Species: B. borstelensis

Binomial name
- Brevibacillus borstelensis (Shida et al. 1995); Shida et al. 1996

Species of bacterium

Brevibacillus borstelensis is a Gram-positive, aerobic, rod-shaped, endospore-forming bacterium of the genus Brevibacillus. The genome of several B. borstelensis strains have been sequenced.

Brevibacillus borstelensis strain 707 is a thermophilic strain capable of degrading and using polyethylene as its sole source of carbon. This strain was shown to reduce the amount of polyethylene by 30% (30 days at 50°C) and demonstrates that nondegradable plastics like polyethylene can be degraded under appropriate conditions.
