= Thermicanus =

Scientific classification
- Domain: Bacteria
- Kingdom: Bacillati
- Phylum: Bacillota
- Class: Bacilli
- Order: Paenibacillales
- Family: Paenibacillaceae
- Genus: Thermicanus; Gößner et al. 2000

Type species
- Thermicanus aegyptius Gößner et al. 2000

Species
- T. aegyptius

Genus of bacteria

Thermicanus is a genus of bacteria from the order Bacillales. Up to now, only one species of this genus is known (Thermicanus aegyptius).
