= Evansella =

Scientific classification
- Domain: Bacteria
- Kingdom: Bacillati
- Phylum: Bacillota
- Class: Bacilli
- Order: Bacillales
- Family: Salisediminibacteriaceae
- Genus: Evansella; Gupta et al. 2020

Type species
- Evansella caseinilytica corrig. (Nogi, Takami & Horikoshi 2005) Gupta et al. 2020

Species
- "E. alkalicola"; E. caseinilyticus; E. cellulosilyticus; E. clarkii; E. halocellulosilytica; E. polygoni; "E. shivajii"; E. tamaricis; E. vedderi

Genus of bacteria

Evansella is a genus of Gram-positive rod-shaped bacteria in the family Bacillaceae within the order Bacillales. The type species for this genus is Evansella cellulosilytica.

Members of Evansella was transferred from the genus Bacillus, a genus that has long been under close scrutiny by the scientific community due to its inclusion of many phylogenetically unrelated species. The original criteria used to assign species into Bacillus were vague and applied to many different species of bacteria, resulting in a large genus full of unrelated organisms with a diverse range of biochemical characteristics. To clarify the taxonomic relationships within the genus, multiple phylogenetic studies have been conducted, resulting in the transfer of many species into novel genera such as Virgibacillus, Solibacillus, Brevibacillus and Ectobacillus. Additionally, Bacillus has been restricted only include species closely related to Bacillus subtilis and Bacillus cereus.

The name Evansella is chosen to celebrate the American microbiologist Dr. Alice Catherine Evans (1885-1975, US Department of Agriculture) in recognition of her contributions to the field of bacteriology.

== Biochemical Characteristics and Molecular Signatures ==
Members of the genus Evansella can be aerobic or facultatively anaerobic. Cells are motile by means of peritrichous flagella. They all are endospore-forming and catalase-positive. Species can be found in industrial areas and soda lakes. Evansella can survive in temperatures ranging from 15°C to 60°C, but optimal growth occurs in the range of 35-40°C.

Three conserved signature indels (CSIs) have been identified through genomic analyses as exclusive for this genus in the proteins GTP pyrophosphokinase family protein, lipoprotein signal peptidase II and Clp protease ClpP. These CSIs provide a novel means to distinguish Evansella from other Bacillaceae genera in molecular terms.

== Taxonomy ==
As of May 2021, there are a total of 5 species with validly published names in the genus Evansella. Various phylogenetic trees created based on concatenated sequences from various datasets of conserved proteins and 16S rRNA genome sequences revealed that members of Evansella form a monophyletic branch. This clade is also reflected in the branching pattern in the Genome Taxonomy Database (GTDB).

=== Phylogeny ===
16S rRNA based LTP_10_2024

- - - Evansella
      - - "E. alkalicola" (Zhai et al. 2022) Narsing Rao et al. 2022
        - E. tamaricis (Zhang et al. 2018) Narsing Rao et al. 2022
      - - E. vedderi (Agnew, Koval & Jarrell 1996) Gupta et al. 2020
        - - E. cellulosilyticus corrig. (Nogi, Takami & Horikoshi 2005) Gupta et al. 2020
          - - E. caseinilyticus corrig. (Reddy, Thirumala & Farooq 2015) Gupta et al. 2020
            - - E. clarkii (Nielsen, Fritze & Priest 1995) Gupta et al. 2020
              - E. polygoni (Aino et al. 2008) Gupta et al. 2020
  - - - Evansella halocellulosilytica Liu et al. 2023
      - "Evansella shivajii" (Kumar et al. 2018) Narsing Rao et al. 2021
    - Alteribacter

120 marker proteins based GTDB 09-RS220

- Evansella
  - "E. shivajii"
  - - E. clarkii [incl. E. polygoni]
    - - - E. cellulosilyticus
        - E. vedderi
      - - E. caseinilyticus
        - - "E. alkalicola"
          - E. tamaricis
