= O-Succinylbenzoate—CoA ligase =

o-Succinylbenzoate—CoA ligase
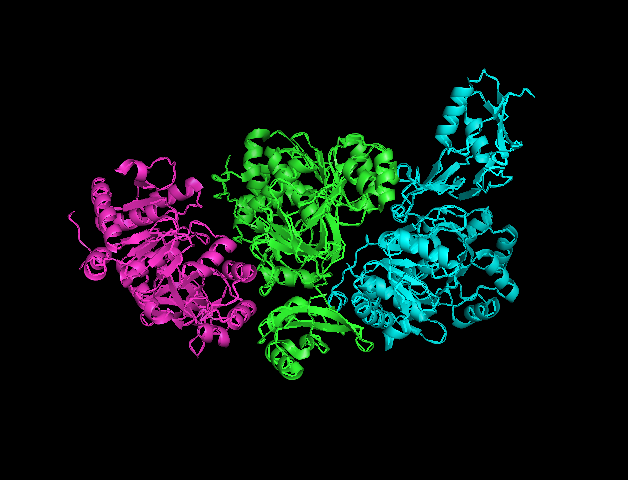
- A cartoon representation of o-succinylbenzoate Co-A ligase of Staphylococcus aureus (strain N315). The different subunits are shown in different colors.

Identifiers
- EC no.: 6.2.1.26
- CAS no.: 72506-70-8

Databases
- IntEnz: IntEnz view
- BRENDA: BRENDA entry
- ExPASy: NiceZyme view
- KEGG: KEGG entry
- MetaCyc: metabolic pathway
- PRIAM: profile
- PDB structures: RCSB PDB PDBe PDBsum
Search
- PMC: articles
- PubMed: articles
- NCBI: proteins

o-Succinylbenzoate—CoA ligase (EC 6.2.1.26), encoded from the menE gene in Escherichia coli, catalyzes the fifth reaction in the synthesis of menaquinone (vitamin K_{2}). This pathway is called 1, 4-dihydroxy-2-naphthoate biosynthesis I. Vitamin K is a quinone that serves as an electron transporter during anaerobic respiration. This process of anaerobic respiration allows the bacteria to generate the energy required to survive.

== Background ==
The systematic name for the MenE enzyme is 2-succinylbenzoate: CoA ligase (AMP-forming). Other names for this enzyme include: o-succinylbenzoate-CoA synthase; o-succinylbenzoyl-coenzyme A synthetase; OSB-CoA synthetase; OSB: CoA ligase; synthetase, and o-succinylbenzoyle coenzyme A. The EC number is 6.2.1.26. MenE belongs to the ligase enzyme family, or class 6.

In the presence of 0.5mM of Ca(2+), K(+), Na(+), and Zn(2+) the enzyme activity was increased twofold. In the presence of .5 mM of Co(2+) and Mn(2+) the enzyme activity was increased fourfold. Mg(2+) is the ion that increases the enzyme activity the most. With .5 mM of Mg(2+) enzyme activity was increased sixfold. Inhibitors of this enzyme include diethylprocarbonate, Fe(2+), Hg(2+), and Mg(2+) (above 1mM).

The maximum specific enzymatic activity is 3.2 micromol/min/mg. The optimum pH is 7.5. The maximum pH is 8. The optimum temperature is 30 degrees Celsius and the maximum temperature is 40 degrees Celsius. The molecular weight of o-succinylbenzoate CoA ligase is 185000 Da or 185 kDa. This enzyme is a tetramer, meaning it has four subunits in its quaternary structure.

The PDB accession code is 3ipl. This is the crystal structure for o-succinylbenzoate CoA ligase in Staphylococcus aureus (strain N315) because the structure for E. coli has not been crystallized as of yet.

== Pathway ==
The pathway that o-succinylbenzoate CoA ligase belongs to is called 1, 4-dihydroxy-2-napthoate biosynthesis I. Other organisms that contain this pathway are eukaryotic bacteria such as Bacillus anthracis. Organisms that contain a pathway similar to this include Arabidopsis thaliana (gene AAE14), Mycobacterium phlei, and Synechocystis sp. PCC 6803. The reason for the difference in pathways is due to the varying functions of vitamin K. Eukaryotic bacteria use vitamin K II while other organisms use vitamin K I. Other pathways that include o-succinylbenzoate CoA ligase include 1, 4-diydroxy-2-naphthoate biosynthesis II (i.e. in Arabidopsis thaliana), biosynthesis of secondary metabolites, metabolic pathways, ubiquinone, and other terpenoid-quinone biosynthesis. In Bacillus anthracis this enzyme is a target of potential antibiotic discovery.

== Reaction ==
The reaction in vitamin K synthesis that includes MenE is as follows:

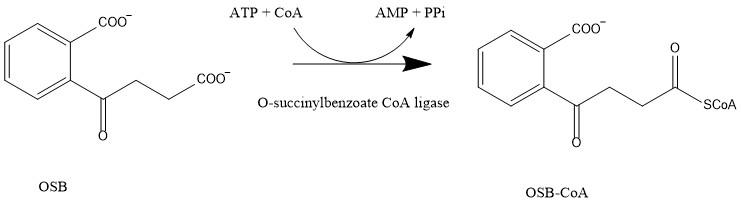
o-Succinylbenzoate CoA ligase reaction in vitamin K synthesis.

ATP + 2-succinylbenzoate + CoA = AMP + diphosphate + 4-(2-carboxyphenyl)-4-oxobutanoyl-CoA

The substrates of this reaction are ATP, CoA, and 2-succinylbenzoate. The cofactors are ATP and CoA. The products are AMP, diphosphate, and 4-(2-carboxyphenyl)-4-oxobutanoyl-CoA.
