= Falsibacillus =

Scientific classification
- Domain: Bacteria
- Kingdom: Bacillati
- Phylum: Bacillota
- Class: Bacilli
- Order: Bacillales
- Family: Bacillaceae
- Genus: Falsibacillus; Zhou et al. 2009

Type species
- Falsibacillus pallidus (Zhou et al. 2008) Zhou et al. 2009

Species
- F. albus; F. pallidus

Genus of bacteria

Falsibacillus is a genus of bacteria from the family Bacillaceae with two known species (Falsibacillus pallidus and Falsibacillus albus).

== Phylogeny ==
The currently accepted taxonomy is based on the List of Prokaryotic names with Standing in Nomenclature (LPSN) and National Center for Biotechnology Information (NCBI).

16S rRNA based LTP_10_2024

- Falsibacillus
  - F. albus Zhou et al. 2009
  - F. pallidus (Zhou et al. 2008) Zhou et al. 2009

120 marker proteins based GTDB 09-RS220

- Falsibacillus
  - F. albus
  - F. pallidus
