= Ectobacillus =

Scientific classification
- Domain: Bacteria
- Kingdom: Bacillati
- Phylum: Bacillota
- Class: Bacilli
- Order: Bacillales
- Family: Bacillaceae
- Genus: Ectobacillus; Gupta et al. 2020

Type species
- Ectobacillus panaciterrae (Ten et al. 2006) Gupta et al. 2020

Species
- E. antri; E. funiculus; E. panaciterrae; E. polymachus; E. ponti

Genus of bacteria

Ectobacillus is a genus of Gram-positive (with the exception of Ectobacillus funiculus, which is Gram-negative), rod-shaped bacteria in the family Bacillaceae within the order Bacillales. The type species for this genus is Ectobacillus panaciterrae.

Ectobacillus is composed of species originally belonging to the genus Bacillus. The genus Bacillus comprises a large number of phylogenetically unrelated bacteria species with a diverse range of biochemical characteristics. The polyphyletic nature of the genus is partly due to the vague criteria used to assign species to this genus (ie. accepting all species that are able to form endospores in aerobic conditions). Comparative genomic analyses and phylogenetic studies have set out to clarify the complex taxonomic relationship of this genus, resulting in the transfer of many species into novel genera such as Virgibacillus, Solibacillus, Brevibacillus and Alteribacter. In addition, the genus Bacillus has been restricted to include only species closely related to Bacillus subtilis and Bacillus cereus.

The name Ectobacillus is derived from its taxonomic position in relation to Bacillus. The prefix "ecto-" (which comes from the Greek preposition ecto, and translates to "outside") and the suffix "-bacillus" (which comes from the Latin noun Bacillus, referring to a rod or small staff, as well as Bacillus, a bacterial genus) come together to form the name Ectobacillus, meaning "outside of Bacillus".

== Biochemical Characteristics and Molecular Signatures ==
Members of the genus Ectobacillus can be aerobic or facultatively anaerobic. They all are endospore-forming and some members are motile cells. Ectobacillus can survive in temperatures ranging from 15°C to 45°C, but optimal growth occurs in the range of 28-35°C.

Analyses of genome sequences from Ectobacillus have identified five conserved signature indels (CSIs) that are exclusive for Ectobacillus species in the proteins 3-isopropylmalate dehydratase small subunit, bacillithiol biosynthesis deacetylase BshB1, aldo or keto reductase, MBL fold metallo-hydrolase, and CYTH domain-containing protein. These CSIs can be used to demarcate Ectobacillus from other Bacillceae genera in molecular terms.

== Taxonomy ==
As of March 2025, there are a total of 5 species with validly published names in the genus Ectobacillus. Members of this clade were found to group together in a monophyletic branch in various phylogenetic trees constructed on conserved genome sequences and 16S rRNA sequences. This branching pattern could also be seen in the Genome Taxonomy Database (GTDB), further supporting this classification.

=== Phylogeny ===
16S rRNA based LTP_10_2024

- Ectobacillus
  - - E. funiculus (Ajithkumar et al. 2002) Gupta et al. 2020
    - E. ponti Deng et al. 2023
  - - E. polymachus (Nguyen & Kim 2015) Gupta et al. 2020
    - - E. antri (Rao et al. 2019) Gupta et al. 2020
      - E. panaciterrae (Ten et al. 2006) Gupta et al. 2020

120 marker proteins based GTDB 09-RS220

- Ectobacillus
  - - E. funiculus
    - E. ponti
  - - E. antri
    - E. panaciterrae
