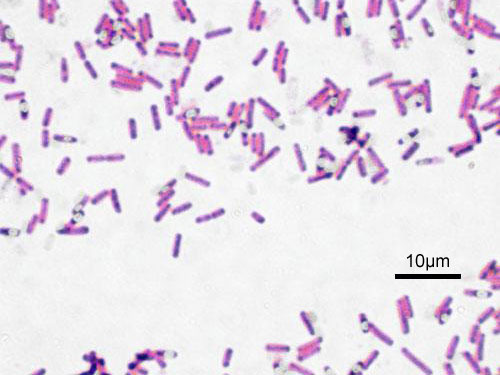
- Bacillus subtilis, Gram stained

Scientific classification
- Domain: Bacteria
- Kingdom: Bacillati
- Phylum: Bacillota
- Class: Bacilli
- Order: Caryophanales
- Family: Bacillaceae; Garrity et al. 2001

Genera
- See text.

Synonyms
- "Bacillidae" Enderlein 1917 non Cavalier-Smith 2020; "Bacilleae" de Toni & Trevisan 1889; "Bacillinae" Pribram 1929; "Bacilloideae" Pribram 1929; "Eisenbergioideae" corrig. Enderlein 1917; "Eubacillinae" corrig. Trevisan 1889; "Schaudinnidae" Enderlein 1917

= Bacillaceae =

Family of bacteria

Bacillaceae, from Latin "bacillus", meaning "little staff, wand", are a family of gram-positive, heterotrophic, rod-shaped bacteria that may produce endospores. Motile members of this family are characterized by peritrichous flagella. Some Bacillaceae are aerobic, while others are facultative or strict anaerobes. Most are not pathogenic, but certain Bacillus species are known to cause disease in humans.

== Gram-variable cell wall ==
Some Bacillaceae, such as the genera Filobacillus, Lentibacillus, and Halobacillus, stain Gram-negative or Gram-variable, but are known to have a Gram-positive cell wall.

== Nomenclature ==
Taxa within this family are sometimes colloquially identified as "bacilli". However, this term is ambiguous because it does not distinguish between class Bacilli, order Bacillales, family Bacillaceae, and genus Bacillus.

== Genera ==
The polyphyletic family Bacillaceae comprises the following:

LPSN & NCBI	16S rRNA based LTP_01_2022 & 120 marker proteins based GTDB 07-RS207
Aeribacillus Miñana-Galbiset al. 2010; Aidingibacillus Wang et al. 2018; Aliibacillus Xu et al. 2019; Alkalibacillus Jeon et al. 2005; Alkalicoccus Zhao et al. 2017; Alkalihalobacillus Patel and Gupta 2020; Alkalilactibacillus Schmidt et al. 2016; Allobacillus Sheu et al. 2011; Alteribacillus Didari et al. 2012; Alteribacter Gupta et al. 2020; Amphibacillus Niimura et al. 1990; "Amylobacillus" Atanassova et al. 2005; Anaerobacillus Zavarzina et al. 2010; Anoxybacillus Pikuta et al. 2000; Aquibacillus Amoozegar et al. 2014; Aquisalibacillus Márquez et al. 2008; Aureibacillus Liu et al. 2015; Bacillus Cohn 1872; Calculibacillus Min et al. 2016; Caldalkalibacillus Xue et al. 2006; Caldaterra Oshima and Moriya 2008; Caldibacillus Coorevits et al. 2012; Calditerricola Moriya et al. 2011; Calidifontibacillus Adiguzel et al. 2020; Camelliibacillus Lin et al. 2018; Cerasibacillus Nakamura et al. 2004; Compostibacillus Yu et al. 2015; Cytobacillus Patel and Gupta 2020; Desertibacillus Bhatt et al. 2017; Domibacillus Seiler et al. 2013; Ectobacillus Gupta et al. 2020; Edaphobacillus Lal et al. 2013; Evansella Gupta et al. 2020; Exiguobacterium Collins et al. 1984; Falsibacillus Zhou et al. 2009; Ferdinandcohnia Gupta et al. 2020; Fermentibacillus Hirota et al. 2016; Fictibacillus Glaeser et al. 2013; Filobacillus Schlesner et al. 2001; Geobacillus Nazina et al. 2001; Geomicrobium Echigo et al. 2010; Gottfriedia Gupta et al. 2020; Gracilibacillus Wainø et al. 1999; Halalkalibacillus Echigo et al. 2007; Halobacillus Spring et al. 1996; Halolactibacillus Ishikawa et al. 2005; Heyndrickxia Gupta et al. 2020; Hydrogenibacillus Kämpfer et al. 2013; Jilinibacillus Liu et al. 2015; Lederbergia Gupta et al. 2020; Lentibacillus Yoon et al. 2002; Litchfieldia Gupta et al. 2020; Lottiidibacillus Liu et al. 2019; Lysinibacillus Ahmed et al. 2007; Margalitia Gupta et al. 2020; Maribacillus Liu et al. 2019; Marinococcus Hao et al. 1985; Massilibacterium Tidjani Alou et al. 2016; Melghiribacillus Addou et al. 2015; Mesobacillus Patel and Gupta 2020; Metabacillus Patel and Gupta 2020; Microaerobacter Khelifi et al. 2011; Natribacillus Echigo et al. 2012; Natronobacillus Sorokin et al. 2009; Neobacillus Patel and Gupta 2020; Niallia Gupta et al. 2020; Oceanobacillus Lu et al. 2002; Ornithinibacillus Mayr et al. 2006; Parageobacillus Aliyu et al. 2019; Paraliobacillus Ishikawa et al. 2003; Paralkalibacillus Hirota et al. 2017; Paucisalibacillus Nunes et al. 2006; Pelagirhabdus Sultanpuram et al. 2016; Peribacillus Patel and Gupta 2020; Piscibacillus Tanasupawat et al. 2007; Polygonibacillus Hirota et al. 2016; Pontibacillus Lim et al. 2005; Pradoshia Saha et al. 2019; Priestia Gupta et al. 2020; "Pseudobacillus" Verma et al. 2019; Pseudogracilibacillus Glaeser et al. 2014; Pseudoneobacillus Kämpfer et al. 2022; Psychrobacillus Krishnamurthi et al. 2011; Pueribacillus Wang et al. 2018; "Quasibacillus" Verma et al. 2017; Radiobacillus Li et al. 2020; Robertmurraya Gupta et al. 2020; Rossellomorea Gupta et al. 2020; "Rubeoparvulum" Tidjani Alou et al. 2017; Saccharococcus Nystrand 1984; Salibacterium Reddy et al. 2015; ''Salicibibacter'' Jang et al. 2018; Salimicrobium Yoon et al. 2007; Salinibacillus Ren and Zhou 2005; Salipaludibacillus Sultanpuram and Mothe 2016; Salirhabdus Albuquerque et al. 2007; Salisediminibacterium Jiang et al. 2012; Saliterribacillus Amoozegar et al. 2013; Salsuginibacillus Carrasco et al. 2007; Schinkia Gupta et al. 2020; Sediminibacillus Carrasco et al. 2008; Siminovitchia Gupta et al. 2020; Sinibacillus Yang and Zhou 2014; Sinobaca Li et al. 2008; Streptohalobacillus Wang et al. 2011; Sutcliffiella Gupta et al. 2020; Swionibacillus Li et al. 2017; Tenuibacillus Ren and Zhou 2005; Tepidibacillus Slobodkina et al. 2014; Terribacillus An et al. 2007; Terrilactibacillus Prasirtsak et al. 2016; Texcoconibacillus Ruiz-Romero et al. 2013; Thalassobacillus García et al. 2005; Thalassorhabdus Sultanpuram and Mothe 2018; "Thermalkalibacillus" Zhao et al. 2006; Thermolongibacillus Cihan et al. 2014; Virgibacillus Heyndrickx et al. 1998; Viridibacillus Albert et al. 2007; Vulcanibacillus L'Haridon et al. 2006; Weizmannia Gupta et al. 2020	"Calditerricolales"; "Calditerricolaceae"; Calditerricola; "Thermicanales"; "Thermicanaceae"; "Haemobacillus"; Thermicanus; DSM-22653; DSM-22653; Brockia; "Ca. Carbonibacillus"; Hydrogenibacillus; "Tepidibacillales"; "Tepidibacillaceae"; Tepidibacillus; Vulcanibacillus; "Aneurinibacillales"; "Aneurinibacillaceae"; Oxalophagus; Aneurinibacillus; RAOX-1; Ammoniphilus; "Brevibacillales"; "Brevibacillaceae"; Brevibacillus; "Caldalkalibacillales"; "Caldalkalibacillaceae"; Caldalkalibacillus; "Rubeoparvulales"; "Rubeoparvulaceae"; "Rubeoparvulum"; "Exiguobacterales"; "Exiguobacteraceae"; Exiguobacterium; CAJFEE01; CAJFEE01; "Ca. Harrysmithimonas"; DSM-16016; "Caldibacillaceae"; Caldibacillus; Swionibacillus; Bacillales; Bacillaceae_I; Sutcliffiella; Bacillaceae_G; Ectobacillus; Gottfriedia; Bacillaceae_H; Priestia; Bacillaceae; Bacillus; Metabacillus; Bacillaceae_L; Ferdinandcohnia; Litchfieldia; "Aeribacillaceae"; Aeribacillus; "Anoxybacillaceae"; Anoxybacillus; Geobacillus; Parageobacillus; Saccharococcus; Thermolongibacillus; Bacillales C; Bacillaceae_J; Calidifontibacillus; Bacillales B; Bacillaceae_C; Heyndrickxia; Lederbergia; Margalitia; Siminovitchia; Weizmannia; "Domibacillaceae"; Domibacillus; "Pseudobacillus"; "Quasibacillus"; DSM-25281; Falsibacillus; "Jeotgalibacillaceae"; Jeotgalibacillus; Bacillaceae_B; Rossellomorea; DSM-1321; Peribacillus; Pradoshia; DSM-18226; Cytobacillus; Mesobacillus; Neobacillus; Niallia; Robertmurraya; Bacillales D; DSM-28697; Aureibacillus; "Alkalibacillaceae"; Alkalibacillus; Allobacillus; Aquisalibacillus; Filobacillus; Halalkalibacillus; Melghiribacillus; Piscibacillus; Salinibacillus; Salirhabdus; Tenuibacillus; "Halobacillaceae"; Halobacillus; Pontibacillus; Salimicrobium; Thalassobacillus; "Amphibacillaceae"; Alkalilactibacillus; Amphibacillus; Aquibacillus; "Ca. Avamphibacillus"; Cerasibacillus; Gracilibacillus; Halolactibacillus; Lentibacillus; Oceanobacillus; Ornithinibacillus; Paraliobacillus; Pelagirhabdus; Pseudogracilibacillus; Radiobacillus; Saliterribacillus; Sediminibacillus; Sinibacillus; Streptohalobacillus; Terribacillus; Virgibacillus; Bacillales E; SA5d-4; Lottiidibacillus; "Massilibacteriaceae"; "Massilibacterium"; Bacillales G; UBA6769; "Maribacillus"; Pueribacillus; HB172195; Pseudalkalibacillus; "Fictibacillaceae"; Fictibacillus; Bacillales H; Bacillaceae_F; Alkalihalobacterium; KJ1-10-99; Desertibacillus; "Anaerobacillaceae"; Anaerobacillus; Bacillaceae_D; Alkalihalobacillus; Alkalihalophilus; Fermentibacillus; Halalkalibacter; Halalkalibacterium; Paralkalibacillus; Polygonibacillus; Shouchella; "Salisediminibacteriaceae"; Alkalicoccus; Alteribacter; Evansella; Salipaludibacillus; Salisediminibacterium; Texcoconibacillus; "Marinococcaceae"; Aidingibacillus; Aliibacillus; Alteribacillus; Geomicrobium; Marinococcus; Natribacillus; Salibacterium; Salicibibacter; Salsuginibacillus; Sinobaca; Thalassorhabdus

== See also ==
- List of bacteria genera
- List of bacterial orders
