= Brevibacillus =

Scientific classification
- Domain: Bacteria
- Kingdom: Bacillati
- Phylum: Bacillota
- Class: Bacilli
- Order: Brevibacillales
- Family: Brevibacillaceae
- Genus: Brevibacillus; Shida et al. 1996

Type species
- Brevibacillus brevis (Migula 1900) Shida et al. 1996

Species
- See text

Genus of bacteria

Brevibacillus is a genus of Gram-positive bacteria in the family Brevibacillaceae.

== Phylogeny ==
The currently accepted taxonomy is based on the List of Prokaryotic names with Standing in Nomenclature (LPSN) and National Center for Biotechnology Information (NCBI).

16S rRNA based LTP_10_2024

- Brevibacillus
  - B. aydinogluensis Inan et al. 2012
  - - B. thermoruber (Manachini et al. 1985) Shida et al. 1996
    - - - B. sediminis Xian et al. 2016
        - - B. humidisoli Lee et al. 2023
          - B. marinus Wang et al. 2021
      - - B. massiliensis Hugon et al. 2013
        - - - B. dissolubilis Li et al. 2022
            - B. levickii Allan et al. 2005
          - - B. fulvus Hatayama et al. 2014
            - - - B. borstelensis (Shida et al. 1995) Shida et al. 1996
                - - B. composti Tang et al. 2021
                  - B. ruminantium Kim et al. 2023
              - - - B. migulae Niu et al. 2020
                  - - B. ginsengisoli Baek et al. 2006
                    - - B. fluminis Choi et al. 2010
                      - - B. halotolerans Song et al. 2017
                        - B. laterosporus (Laubach 1916) Shida et al. 1996
                - - - B. invocatus Logan et al. 2002
                    - B. panacihumi Kim et al. 2009
                  - - B. gelatini Inan et al. 2016
                    - - - B. limnophilus Goto et al. 2004
                        - B. parabrevis (Takagi et al. 1993) Shida et al. 1996
                      - - B. agri (Nakamura 1993) Shida et al. 1996
                        - - B. schisleri Johnson & Dunlap 2019
                          - - - B. brevis (Migula 1900) Shida et al. 1996
                              - B. formosus (Shida et al. 1995) Shida et al. 1996
                            - - B. fortis Johnson & Dunlap 2019
                              - - B. reuszeri (Shida et al. 1995) Shida et al. 1996
                                - - B. porteri Johnson & Dunlap 2019
                                  - - B. choshinensis (Takagi et al. 1993) Shida et al. 1996
                                    - - B. centrosporus (Nakamura 1993) Shida et al. 1996
                                      - B. nitrificans Takebe et al. 2012

120 marker proteins based GTDB 09-RS220

- Brevibacillus
  - B. massiliensis
  - - - B. humidisoli
      - B. marinus
    - - - B. fluminis
        - - B. dissolubilis
          - - B. daliensis Ye et al. 2024
            - - B. halotolerans
              - B. laterosporus
      - - B. migulae
        - - B. fulvus
          - - - B. sediminis
              - B. thermoruber
            - - - B. borstelensis
                - B. composti
              - - - B. invocatus
                  - B. panacihumi
                - - - B. centrosporus [incl. B. nitrificans]
                    - B. choshinensis
                  - - - B. parabrevis
                      - - B. agri
                        - B. gelatini
                    - - B. reuszeri
                      - - - B. brevis
                          - B. formosus
                        - - "B. antibioticus" Choi et al. 2019
                          - - B. fortis
                            - B. porteri

Unassigned species:

- "B. texasporus" Wu, Ballard & Jiang 2005
