= List of restriction enzyme cutting sites: Ba–Bc =

Legend of nucleobases
Code	Nucleotide represented
A	Adenine (A)
C	Cytosine (C)
G	Guanine (G)
T	Thymine (T)
N	A, C, G or T
M	A or C
R	A or G
W	A or T
Y	C or T
S	C or G
K	G or T
H	A, C or T
B	C, G or T
V	A, C or G
D	A, G or T

This article contains a list of the most studied restriction enzymes whose names start with Ba to Bc inclusive. It contains approximately 120 enzymes.

The following information is given:

- Enzyme: Accepted name of the molecule, according to the internationally adopted nomenclature, and bibliographical references. (Further reading: see the section "Nomenclature" in the article "Restriction enzyme".)
- PDB code: Code used to identify the structure of a protein in the PDB database of protein structures. The 3D atomic structure of a protein provides highly valuable information to understand the intimate details of its mechanism of action.
- Source: Organism that naturally produces the enzyme.
- Recognition sequence: Sequence of DNA recognized by the enzyme and to which it specifically binds.
- Cut: Cutting site and DNA products of the cut. The recognition sequence and the cutting site usually match, but sometimes the cutting site can be dozens of nucleotides away from the recognition site.
- Isoschizomers and neoschizomers: An isoschizomer is an enzyme that recognizes the same sequence as another. A neoschizomer is a special type of isoschizomer that recognizes the same sequence as another, but cuts in a different manner. A maximum number of 8-10 most common isoschizomers are indicated for every enzyme but there may be many more. Neoschizomers are shown in bold and green color font (e.g.: **BamHI**). When "None on date" is indicated, that means that there were no registered isoschizomers in the databases on that date with a clearly defined cutting site. Isoschizomers indicated in white font and grey background correspond to enzymes not listed in the current lists:

as in this not listed enzyme:	EcoR70I

== Restriction enzymes ==
=== Ba - Bc ===
**Enzyme**	**PDB code**	Source	**Recognition sequence**	**Cut**	**Isoschizomers**
Bac36I		Bacillus alcalophilus 36	5' GGNCC; 3' CCNGG	5' ---G GNCC--- 3'; 3' ---CCNG G--- 5'	AspS9I, AvcI, BavAII, Bce22I, Bsp1894I, Bsu54I, **FmuI**, NspIV
BaeI		Bacillus sphaericus	5' ACN_{4}GTAYC; 3' TGN_{4}CATYG	5' ---ACN_{4}GTAYCN_{6}NNNNNN --- 3'; 3' ---TGN_{4}CATYGN_{6}N NNNNN--- 5'	— None in May 2010 —
BalI		Brevibacterium albidum	5' TGGCCA; 3' ACCGGT	5' ---TGG CCA--- 3'; 3' ---ACC GGT--- 5'
Bal228I		Bacillus alcalophilus 228	5' GGNCC; 3' CCNGG	5' ---G GNCC--- 3'; 3' ---CCNG G--- 5'	AspS9I, AvcI, BavAII, BshKI, Bsp1894I, Bsu54I, **FmuI**, NspIV
BamHI	1BAM	Bacillus amyloliquefaciens H	5' GGATCC; 3' CCTAGG	5' ---G GATCC--- 3'; 3' ---CCTAG G--- 5'	AccEBI, AliI, ApaCI, AsiI, Bce751I, Bsp98I, Bsp4009I, BspAAIII, CelI, Nsp29132II, NspSAIV, SolI, SurI
BamNII		Bacillus amyloliquefaciens N	5' GGWCC; 3' CCWGG	5' ---G GWCC--- 3'; 3' ---CCWG G--- 5'	BcuAI, BsrAI, CauI, EagMI, FdiI, HgiCII, HgiJI, SinI
BanI		Bacillus aneurinolyticus	5' GGYRCC; 3' CCRYGG	5' ---G GYRCC--- 3'; 3' ---CCRYG G--- 5'	AccB1I, BbvBI, BspT107I, Eco64I, HgiCI, HgiHI, MspB4I, PfaAI
BanII		Bacillus aneurinolyticus	5' GRGCYC; 3' CYCGRG	5' ---GRGCY C--- 3'; 3' ---C YCGRG--- 5'
BanIII		Bacillus aneurinolyticus	5' ATCGAT; 3' TAGCTA	5' ---AT CGAT--- 3'; 3' ---TAGC TA--- 5'	AagI, BavCI, Bsa29I, BseCI, BspDI, Bsu15I, BsuTUI, ClaI
BanAI		Bacillus anthracis	5' GGCC; 3' CCGG	5' ---GG CC--- 3'; 3' ---CC GG--- 5'
BasI		Bacillus sp.	5' CCAN_{5}TGG; 3' GGTN_{5}ACC	5' ---CCANNNN NTGG--- 3'; 3' ---GGTN NNNNACC--- 5'	AccB7I, AcpII, Asp10HII, Esp1396I, PflBI, PflMI, Van91I
BauI		Bacillus aquaemaris RFL1	5' CACGAG; 3' GTGCTC	5' ---C ACGAG--- 3'; 3' ---GTGCT C--- 5'
BavI		Bacillus alvei	5' CAGCTG; 3' GTCGAC	5' ---CAG CTG--- 3'; 3' ---GTC GAC--- 5'
BavAI		Bacillus alvei A	5' CAGCTG; 3' GTCGAC	5' ---CAG CTG--- 3'; 3' ---GTC GAC--- 5'
BavAII		Bacillus alvei A	5' GGNCC; 3' CCNGG	5' ---G GNCC--- 3'; 3' ---CCNG G--- 5'	AspS9I, AvcI, BavBII, BshKI, Bsp1894I, Bsu54I, **FmuI**, NspIV
BavBI		Bacillus alvei B	5' CAGCTG; 3' GTCGAC	5' ---CAG CTG--- 3'; 3' ---GTC GAC--- 5'
BavBII		Bacillus alvei B	5' GGNCC; 3' CCNGG	5' ---G GNCC--- 3'; 3' ---CCNG G--- 5'	AspS9I, Bac36I, BavAII, BshKI, BspBII, Bsu54I, **FmuI**, Pde12I
BavCI		Bacillus alvei C	5' ATCGAT; 3' TAGCTA	5' ---AT CGAT--- 3'; 3' ---TAGC TA--- 5'	AagI, BanIII, Bsa29I, BseCI, BspDI, Bsu15I, BsuTUI, ClaI
BbeI		Bifidobacterium breve YIT4006	5' GGCGCC; 3' CCGCGG	5' ---GGCGC C--- 3'; 3' ---C CGCGG--- 5'
BbiII		Bifidobacterium bifidum YIT4007	5' GRCGYC; 3' CYGCRG	5' ---GR CGYC--- 3'; 3' ---CYGC RG--- 5'	AcyI, AhaII, BbiII, HgiHII, Hin1I, Hsp92I, Msp17I, PamII
Bbi24I		Bifidobacterium bifidum S-24	5' ACGCGT; 3' TGCGCA	5' ---A CGCGT--- 3'; 3' ---TGCGC A--- 5'
BbrI		Bordetella bronchiseptica 4994	5' AAGCTT; 3' TTCGAA	5' ---A AGCTT--- 3'; 3' ---TTCGA A--- 5'
Bbr7I		Bacillus brevis 7	5' GAAGAC; 3' CTTCTG	5' ---GAAGACN_{6}N NNNNN--- 3'; 3' ---CTTCTGN_{6}NNNNNN --- 5'
BbrPI		Bacillus brevis	5' CACGTG; 3' GTGCAC	5' ---CAC GTG--- 3'; 3' ---GTG CAC--- 5'	AcvI, BcoAI, Eco72I, PmaCI, PmlI, PspCI
BbsI		Bacillus laterosporus	5' GAAGAC; 3' CTTCTG	5' ---GAAGACNN NNNN--- 3'; 3' ---CTTCTGNNNNNN --- 5'
BbuI		Bacillus circulans	5' GCATGC; 3' CGTACG	5' ---GCATG C--- 3'; 3' ---C GTACG--- 5'
BbvI		Bacillus brevis	5' GCAGC; 3' CGTCG	5' ---GCAGCN_{7}N NNNN--- 3'; 3' ---CGTCGN_{7}NNNNN --- 5'	AlwXI, BseKI, BseXI, Bsp423I, Bst12I, Bst71I, BstV1I
BbvII		Bacillus brevis 80	5' GAAGAC; 3' CTTCTG	5' ---GAAGACNN NNNN--- 3'; 3' ---CTTCTGNNNNNN --- 5'
Bbv12I		Bacillus brevis 12	5' GWGCWC; 3' CWCGWG	5' ---GWGCW C--- 3'; 3' ---C WCGWG--- 5'	Alw21I, AspHI, Bsh45I, BsiHKAI, HgiAI, / HpyF46II, / MspV281I
Bbv16II		Bacillus brevis 16	5' GAAGAC; 3' CTTCTG	5' ---GAAGACNN NNNN--- 3'; 3' ---CTTCTGNNNNNN --- 5'
BbvAI		Bacillus brevis A	5' GAAN_{4}TTC; 3' CTTN_{4}AAG	5' ---GAANN NNTTC--- 3'; 3' ---CTTNN NNAAG--- 5'	Asp700I, MroXI, PdmI, XmnI
BbvAII		Bacillus brevis A	5' ATCGAT; 3' TAGCTA	5' ---AT CGAT--- 3'; 3' ---TAGC TA--- 5'	BavCI, Bci29I, Bli86I, BseCI, BspZEI, Bsu15I, ClaI, Rme21I
BbvAIII		Bacillus brevis A	5' TCCGGA; 3' AGGCCT	5' ---T CCGGA--- 3'; 3' ---AGGCC T--- 5'	AccIII, Aor13HI, BlfI, BseAI, Bsp13I, BspEI, Bsu23I, Kpn2I
BbvBI		Bacillus brevis B	5' GGYRCC; 3' CCRYGG	5' ---G GYRCC--- 3'; 3' ---CCRYG G--- 5'	BanI, BshNI, BspT107I, Eco64I, HgiCI, HgiHI, MspB4I, PfaAI
BbvCI		Bacillus brevis	5' CCTCAGC; 3' GGAGTCG	5' ---CC TCAGC--- 3'; 3' ---GGAGT CG--- 5'	AbeI
Bca77I		Bacillus caldolyticus	5' WCCGGW; 3' WGGCCW	5' ---W CCGGW--- 3'; 3' ---WGGCC W--- 5'
BccI		Bacteroides caccae	5' CCATC; 3' GGTAG	5' ---CCATCNNNN N--- 3'; 3' ---GGTAGNNNNN --- 5'
Bce4I		Bacillus cereus B4	5' GCN_{7}GC; 3' CGN_{7}CG	5' ---GCNNNNN NNGC--- 3'; 3' ---CGNN NNNNNCG--- 5'
Bce22I		Bacillus cereus 22	5' GGNCC; 3' CCNGG	5' ---G GNCC--- 3'; 3' ---CCNG G--- 5'	AspS9I, Bac36I, BavAII, BshKI, BspBII, CcuI, **FmuI**, Pde12I
Bce83I		Bacillus cereus 83	5' CTTGAG; 3' GAACTC	5' ---CTTGAGN_{13}NNN --- 3'; 3' ---GAACTCN_{13}N NN--- 5'
Bce243I		Bacillus cereus	5' GATC; 3' CTAG	5' --- GATC--- 3'; 3' ---CTAG --- 5'	Bfi57I, Bsp143I, BspJI, BstMBI, CviAI, Kzo9I, NdeII, Sth368I
Bce751I		Bacillus cereus 751	5' GGATCC; 3' CCTAGG	5' ---G GATCC--- 3'; 3' ---CCTAG G--- 5'	BamHI, Bce751I, BnaI, Bsp98I, Bsp4009I, BstI, NspSAIV, Pfl8I
BceAI		Bacillus cereus 1315	5' ACGGC; 3' TGCCG	5' ---ACGGCN_{11}N NN--- 3'; 3' ---TGCCGN_{11}NNN --- 5'
BceBI		Bacillus cereus 1323	5' CGCG; 3' GCGC	5' ---CG CG--- 3'; 3' ---GC GC--- 5'	AccII, Bsh1236I, BtkI, Csp68KVI, FalII, FauBII, FnuDII, **SelI**, ThaI
BceCI		Bacillus cereus 1195	5' GCN_{7}GC; 3' CGN_{7}CG	5' ---GCNNNNN NNGC--- 3'; 3' ---CGNN NNNNNCG--- 5'
BcefI		Bacillus cereus fluorescens	5' ACGGC; 3' TGCCG	5' ---ACGGCN_{10}NN N--- 3'; 3' ---TGCCGN_{10}NNN --- 5'
BcgI		Bacillus coagulans	5' CGAN_{6}TGC; 3' GCTN_{6}ACG	5' ---CGAN_{6}TGCN_{9}NNN --- 3'; 3' ---GCTN_{6}ACGN_{9}N NN--- 5'
Bci29I		Bacillus circulans 29	5' ATCGAT; 3' TAGCTA	5' ---AT CGAT--- 3'; 3' ---TAGC TA--- 5'	BavCI, BciBI, Bli86I, BseCI, BspZEI, Bsu15I, ClaI, Rme21I
BciBI		Bacillus circulans B	5' ATCGAT; 3' TAGCTA	5' ---AT CGAT--- 3'; 3' ---TAGC TA--- 5'	BavCI, BcmI, Bli86I, BseCI, BspZEI, Bsu15I, ClaI, Rme21I
BciBII		Bacillus circulans B	5' CCWGG; 3' GGWCC	5' ---CC WGG--- 3'; 3' ---GGW CC--- 5'	**AjnI**, ApyI, BptI, Bst1I, BstOI, BstM6I, Bst2UI, **EcoRII**, MvaI
BciVI		Bacillus circulans	5' GTATCC; 3' CATAGG	5' ---GTATCCN_{4}NN --- 3'; 3' ---CATAGGN_{4}N N--- 5'	BfuI
BclI		Bacillus caldolyticus	5' TGATCA; 3' ACTAGT	5' ---T GATCA--- 3'; 3' ---ACTAG T--- 5'	AbaI, BsiQI, BspXII, BstT7I, FbaI, Ksp22I, / ParI
BcmI		Bacillus sp.	5' ATCGAT; 3' TAGCTA	5' ---AT CGAT--- 3'; 3' ---TAGC TA--- 5'	BsuTUI, Bsu15I, BavCI, Bli86I, BspZEI, Rme21I, BseCI, BdiI
BcnI	2ODH	Bacillus centrosporus RFL1	5' CCSGG; 3' GGSCC	5' ---CC SGG--- 3'; 3' ---GGS CC--- 5'	AhaI, AseII, AsuC2I, / BpuMI, / CauII, **Eco1831I**, HgiS22I,**Kpn49kII**, NciI
BcoI		Bacillus coagulans SM 1	5' CYCGRG; 3' GRGCYC	5' ---C YCGRG--- 3'; 3' ---GRGCY C--- 5'	Ama87I, AquI, BsoBI, BstSI, Eco88I, NspSAI, OfoI, PunAI
Bco5I		Bacillus coagulans 5	5' CTCTTC; 3' GAGAAG	5' ---CTCTTCN NNN--- 3'; 3' ---GAGAAGNNNN --- 5'
Bco27I		Bacillus coagulans 27	5' CCGG; 3' GGCC	5' ---C CGG--- 3'; 3' ---GGC C--- 5'
Bco116I		Bacillus coagulans 116	5' CTCTTC; 3' GAGAAG	5' ---CTCTTCN NNN--- 3'; 3' ---GAGAAGNNNN --- 5'
Bco118I		Bacillus coagulans 118	5' RCCGGY; 3' YGGCCR	5' ---R CCGGY--- 3'; 3' ---YGGCC R--- 5'
BcoAI		Bacillus coagulans AUCM B-732	5' CACGTG; 3' GTGCAC	5' ---CAC GTG--- 3'; 3' ---GTG CAC--- 5'	AcvI, BbrPI, Eco72I, PmaCI, PmlI, PspCI
BcoKI		Bacillus coagulans	5' CTCTTC; 3' GAGAAG	5' ---CTCTTCN NNN--- 3'; 3' ---GAGAAGNNNN --- 5'
BcuI		Bacillus coagulans Vs 29-022	5' ACTAGT; 3' TGATCA	5' ---A CTAGT--- 3'; 3' ---TGATC A--- 5'	AhII, AclNI, SpeI
BcuAI		Bacillus cereus BKM B-814	5' GGWCC; 3' CCWGG	5' ---G GWCC--- 3'; 3' ---CCWG G--- 5'	BamNxI, BsrAI, Csp68KI, EagMI, FssI, HgiCII, HgiJI, SinI
