= Taxon in disguise =

Hypothetical example

- A group
  - A1
  - - B
    - A2
- C

B is phylogenetically part of the A group but not taxonomically, so A is paraphyletic.

In bacteriology, a taxon in disguise is a species, genus or higher unit of biological classification whose evolutionary history reveals that it has evolved from another unit of a similar or lower rank, making the parent unit paraphyletic. That happens when rapid evolution makes a new species appear so radically different from the ancestral group that it is not (initially) recognised as belonging to the parent phylogenetic group, which is left as an evolutionary grade.

While the term is from bacteriology, parallel examples are found throughout the tree of life. For example, four-footed animals have evolved from piscine ancestors but since they are not generally considered fish, they can be said to be "fish in disguise".

In many cases, the paraphyly can be resolved by reclassifying the taxon in question under the parent group. However, in bacteriology, since renaming groups may have serious consequences by causing confusion over the identity of pathogens, it is generally avoided for some groups.

== Examples ==
=== Shigella ===
The bacterial genus Shigella is the cause of bacillary dysentery, a potentially-severe infection that kills over a million people every year. The genus (S. dysenteriae, S. flexneri, S. boydii, S. sonnei) have evolved from the common intestinal bacterium Escherichia coli, which renders that species paraphyletic. E. coli itself can also cause serious dysentery, but differences in genetic makeup between E. coli and Shigella cause different medical conditions and symptoms.

Escherichia coli is a poorly-classified species as some strains share only 20% of their genome. The species has proven to be quite diversive and should ideally be subdivided into further taxonomic groups. However, medical conditions associated with E. coli and Shigella complicate reclassification in an attempt to avoid causing confusion in medical contexts. As such, Shigella and several sub-branches of E. coli remain undivided despite genomic evidence suggesting otherwise.

=== B. cereus-group ===
Similarly, the Bacillus species of the B. cereus-group (B. anthracis, B. cereus, B . thuringiensis, B. mycoides, B. pseudomycoides, B. weihenstephanensis and B. medusa) have 99-100% similar 16S rRNA sequence (97% is a commonly-cited adequate species limit) and should be considered a single species. Some members of the group appear to have arisen from other Bacillus strains by acquiring a protein coding plasmid and so the group may thus be polyphyletic. For medical reasons, such as anthrax, the current arrangement of separate species has remained intact.

=== Large genera of microbes ===
- The bacterial genus Pseudomonas has enlarged through several generations of taxonomic methods, bringing the species count to alarming proportions, with around 800 species recognized by the mid-20th century. The nitrogen-fixing bacteria of the genus Azotobacter and the species Azomonas macrocytogenes have evolved from a species in the genus Pseudomonas. Its nitrogen-fixing capabilities and deviant features have caused Azotobacter to be described as "Pseudomonas in disguise".
- The genus Bacillus was described early in the history of microbiology and so is a large genus that is very genetically diverse, 266 species. The genera Paenibacillus and Brevibacillus are clades that are nested within Bacillus. Since Bacillus is highly medically relevant and Paenibacillus is a model organism that is used in research, renaming them to reflect phylogeny would result in confusion.

== See also ==
- Monophyly
- Paraphyly
- Polyphyly
- Species problem
- Evolutionary grade
- Cryptic species complex
- Synonym (taxonomy)
- Taxonomy
- LPSN, a list of accepted bacterial and archaeal names
- Bacterial phyla, a complex classification scheme
- Cyanobacteria, a phylum of common bacteria that remain poorly classified
