= Alkalicoccus =

Scientific classification
- Domain: Bacteria
- Kingdom: Bacillati
- Phylum: Bacillota
- Class: Bacilli
- Order: Caryophanales
- Family: Bacillaceae
- Genus: Alkalicoccus; Zhao et al. 2017

Type species
- Alkalicoccus saliphilus (Romano et al. 2005) Zhao et al. 2017

Species
- Alkalicoccus chagannorensis; Alkalicoccus daliensis; Alkalicoccus halolimnae; Alkalicoccus luteus; Alkalicoccus saliphilus; Alkalicoccus urumqiensis

Genus of bacteria

Alkalicoccus is a genus of gram-positive rod-shaped bacteria in the family Bacillaceae from the order Bacillales. The type species of this genus is Alkalicoccus saliphilus.

Members of Alkalicoccus were previously species (except for the type species, Alkalicoccus saliphilus) belonging to Bacillus, a genus that has been recognized as displaying extensive polyphyly and phylogenetic heterogeneity due to the vague criteria (such as the ability to form endospores in the presence of oxygen) previously used to assign species to this clade. Multiple studies using comparative phylogenetic analyses have been published in an attempt to clarify the evolutionary relationships between Bacillus species, resulting in the establishment of numerous novel genera such as Alkalihalobacillus, Brevibacillus, Solibacillus, Alicyclobacillus, Virgibacillus and Evansella. In addition, the genus Bacillus has been restricted to only include species closely related to Bacillus subtilis and Bacillus cereus.

The name Alkalicoccus is derived from the prefix "-alkali" (from the Arabic article al, which translates to "the" and the Arabic noun galiy, referring to the ashes of saltwort) and the suffix "-coccus" (from the Latin coccus, referring to a sphere). Together, Alkalicoccus translates to a coccus living in basic surroundings.

== Biochemical characteristics and molecular signatures ==
Members of this genus are aerobic or facultatively anaerobic and found in mainly in saline lakes. Some members can produce endospores and are motile. Most species are moderately halophilic and alkali-tolerant and require NaCl (2–8%, w/v) for growth. Temperature range for growth is 8–45 °C, with optimum growth temperature generally in the range 30–37 °C.`

Analyses of genome sequences from Alkalicoccus species identified nine conserved signature indels (CSIs) that are exclusive for this genus in the following proteins: bis(5'-nucleosyl)-tetraphosphatase PrpE, dihydroorotate dehydrogenase electron transfer subunit, DUF368 domain-containing protein, penicillin-binding protein, DNA polymerase/3'−5' exonuclease PolX, alpha-glucosidase, 1,4-alpha-glucan branching protein GlgB, SDR family oxidoreductase and tRNA1(Val) [adenine(37)-N6]-methyltransferase. These molecular signatures provide a reliable method of identification and differentiation for Alkalicoccus species from other Bacillaceae genera and bacteria.

== Taxonomy ==
Alkalicoccus, as of May 2021, contains a total of 6 species with validly published names. This genus was identified as a monophyletic clade and phylogenetically unrelated to other Bacillus species in studies examining the taxonomic relationships within Bacillus. This branching pattern is also observed in the Genome Taxonomy Database (GTDB).

One non-validly published species, "Bacillus daqingensis", is also found to group with other members of Alkalicoccus in phylogenetic trees as well as share the same molecular markers in the form of conserved signature indels (CSIs). However, its transfer was not officially proposed due to the lack of culture strain information. Further revision of this genus is required as additional genomes and novel species are discovered and assigned.

=== Taxonomy ===
16S rRNA based LTP_10_2024

- Alkalicoccus
  - A. urumqiensis (Zhang et al. 2016) Gupta et al. 2020
  - - - Bacillus daqingensis Wang et al. 2023
      - A. luteus (Subhash, Sasikala & Ramana 2014) Gupta et al. 2020
    - - A. daliensis (Zhai et al. 2012) Gupta et al. 2020
      - - A. chagannorensis (Carrasco et al. 2007) Gupta et al. 2020
        - - A. halolimnae Zhao et al. 2017
          - A. saliphilus (Romano et al. 2005) Zhao et al. 2017

120 marker proteins based GTDB 09-RS220

- Alkalicoccus
  - - A. chagannorensis
    - A. urumqiensis
  - - - A. daliensis
      - A. luteus
    - - A. halolimnae
      - A. saliphilus
