= Bacillus aminovorans =

Scientific classification
- Domain: Bacteria
- Kingdom: Bacillati
- Phylum: Bacillota
- Class: Bacilli
- Order: Bacillales
- Family: Bacillaceae
- Genus: Bacillus
- Species: B. aminovorans

Binomial name
- Bacillus aminovorans

Species of bacterium

Bacillus aminovorans is a Gram-positive, rod-shaped species of bacteria. Samples of this species have been isolated from dust above the Atlantic Ocean. Though phenotypically similar to the species Sporosarcina globispora (formerly Bacillus globisporus), Bacillus marinus, and Bacillus insolitus, B. aminovorans is the only one of these species capable of using sucrose as a sole carbon source.
