= Alteribacillus =

Scientific classification
- Domain: Bacteria
- Kingdom: Bacillati
- Phylum: Bacillota
- Class: Bacilli
- Order: Bacillales
- Family: Marinococcaceae
- Genus: Alteribacillus; Didari et al. 2012

Type species
- Alteribacillus bidgolensis Didari et al. 2012

Species
- A. alkaliphilus; A. bidgolensis; A. iranensis; A. persepolensis

Genus of bacteria

Alteribacillus is a genus of bacteria from the family Bacillaceae.

== Phylogeny ==
The currently accepted taxonomy is based on the List of Prokaryotic names with Standing in Nomenclature (LPSN) and National Center for Biotechnology Information (NCBI).

16S rRNA based LTP_10_2024

- - Alteribacillus persepolensis (Amoozegar et al. 2009) Didari et al. 2012
  - - - Bacillus piscicola
      - Alteribacillus iranensis (Bagheri et al. 2012) Azmatunnisa Begum et al. 2016
    - - - Alteribacillus
          - A. alkaliphilus Azmatunnisa Begum et al. 2016
          - A. bidgolensis Didari et al. 2012
      - - Aliibacillus
        - Salibacterium

120 marker proteins based GTDB 09-RS220

- - - Aliibacillus
    - - Bacillus piscicola
      - Alteribacillus iranensis
  - - - Alteribacillus
        - A. bidgolensis
        - A. persepolensis
    - Salibacterium

== See also ==
- List of Bacteria genera
- List of bacterial orders
