= Bacillus stratosphericus =

Scientific classification
- Domain: Bacteria
- Kingdom: Bacillati
- Phylum: Bacillota
- Class: Bacilli
- Order: Bacillales
- Family: Bacillaceae
- Genus: Bacillus
- Species: B. stratosphericus

Binomial name
- Bacillus stratosphericus Shivaji et al., 2006

Species of bacterium

Bacillus stratosphericus is a microbe commonly found in high concentrations in the stratosphere. It is commonly found in the atmosphere but brought down to Earth as a result of atmospheric cycling processes. Scientists have successfully engineered it to create a biofilm which produce electricity.
