= Bacillus altitudinis =

Scientific classification
- Domain: Bacteria
- Kingdom: Bacillati
- Phylum: Bacillota
- Class: Bacilli
- Order: Bacillales
- Family: Bacillaceae
- Genus: Bacillus
- Species: B. altitudinis

Binomial name
- Bacillus altitudinis Shivaji et al. 2006

Species of bacterium

Bacillus altitudinis is a species of bacteria first isolated from cryogenic tubes used for collecting air samples from high altitudes, hence its name. Its type strain is 41KF2b^{T} (=MTCC 7306^{T} =JCM 13350^{T}).
