= Fictibacillus =

Scientific classification
- Domain: Bacteria
- Kingdom: Bacillati
- Phylum: Bacillota
- Class: Bacilli
- Order: Bacillales
- Family: Bacillaceae
- Genus: Fictibacillus; Glaeser et al. 2013

Type species
- Fictibacillus barbaricus (Täubel et al. 2003) Glaeser et al. 2013

Species
- See text

Genus of bacteria

Fictibacillus is a genus of bacteria from the family Bacillaceae.

== Phylogeny ==
The currently accepted taxonomy is based on the List of Prokaryotic names with Standing in Nomenclature (LPSN) and National Center for Biotechnology Information (NCBI).

16S rRNA based LTP_10_2024

- Fictibacillus
  - F. gelatini
  - - - - F. marinisediminis
        - F. rigui (Baik et al. 2010) Glaeser et al. 2013
      - - F. enclensis
        - - F. macauensis
          - F. solisalsi
    - - F. aquaticus
      - - - F. arsenicus
          - F. barbaricus
        - - F. halophilus
          - - F. nanhaiensis
            - F. phosphorivorans

120 marker proteins based GTDB 09-RS220

- Fictibacillus
  - - F. gelatini (De Clerck et al. 2004) Glaeser et al. 2013
    - - F. macauensis (Zhang et al. 2006) Glaeser et al. 2013
      - - - F. marinisediminis Cho et al. 2023
          - "F. terranigra" Pellegrinetti et al. 2024
        - - F. enclensis Dastager et al. 2014
          - F. solisalsi (Liu et al. 2009) Glaeser et al. 2013
  - - F. aquaticus Pal et al. 2018
    - - F. arsenicus (Shivaji et al. 2005) Glaeser et al. 2013
      - - F. barbaricus (Täubel et al. 2003) Glaeser et al. 2013
        - - F. halophilus Sharma et al. 2016
          - - F. nanhaiensis (Chen et al. 2011) Glaeser et al. 2013
            - - "F. norfolkensis" Gilroy et al. 2021
              - F. phosphorivorans Glaeser et al. 2013

Unassigned species:

- "F. fluitans" Yadav et al. 2024
- "F. iocasae" Wang, Zhang & Sun 2018
