= Bacillus mojavensis =

Scientific classification
- Domain: Bacteria
- Kingdom: Bacillati
- Phylum: Bacillota
- Class: Bacilli
- Order: Caryophanales
- Family: Bacillaceae
- Genus: Bacillus
- Species: B. mojavensis

Binomial name
- Bacillus mojavensis Roberts et al. 1994

Species of bacterium

Bacillus mojavensis is a bacterium. Bacillus axarquiensis and Bacillus malacitensis are considered later heterotypic synonyms of B. mojavensis. It is named after the Mojave Desert.
