= Mesobacillus boroniphilus =

Scientific classification
- Domain: Bacteria
- Kingdom: Bacillati
- Phylum: Bacillota
- Class: Bacilli
- Order: Caryophanales
- Family: Bacillaceae
- Genus: Bacillus
- Species: B. boroniphilus

Binomial name
- Bacillus boroniphilus Ahmed et al. 2007

Species of bacterium

Bacillus boroniphilus is a species of highly boron-tolerant bacterium, hence its name. It is Gram-positive, motile, and rod-shaped, with type strain T-15Z^{T} (DSM 17376^{T} = IAM 15287^{T} = ATCC BAA-1204^{T}). Its genome has been sequenced.

This species has been recently been reclassified as Mesobacillus boroniphilus.
