= Bacillus gaemokensis =

Scientific classification
- Domain: Bacteria
- Kingdom: Bacillati
- Phylum: Bacillota
- Class: Bacilli
- Order: Bacillales
- Family: Bacillaceae
- Genus: Bacillus
- Species: B. gaemokensis

Binomial name
- Bacillus gaemokensis Jung et al. 2010

Species of bacterium

Bacillus gaemokensis is a bacterium. It is a Gram-positive, rod-shaped, endospore-forming organism with the type strain BL3-6^{T} (=KCTC 13318^{T} =JCM 15801^{T}).
