= Neobacillus =

Scientific classification
- Domain: Bacteria
- Kingdom: Bacillati
- Phylum: Bacillota
- Class: Bacilli
- Order: Bacillales
- Family: Cytobacillaceae
- Genus: Neobacillus; Patel and Gupta 2020

Type species
- Neobacillus niacini (Nagel & Andreesen 1991) Patel & Gupta 2020

Species
- See text

Genus of rod-shaped bacteria

Neobacillus is a genus of rod-shaped bacteria that show Gram-positive or Gram-variable staining. This genus belongs under the family Bacillaceae within the order Bacillales. The type species of Neobacillus is Neobacillus niacini.

Members of this genus were previously part of the genus Bacillus. It has long been recognized that the genus Bacillus comprises a wide range of phylogenetically unrelated bacteria, demonstrated through multiple phylogenetic studies and comparative genome studies. Bacillus species were assigned based on vague criteria such as the ability to form endospores in the presence of oxygen, a criterion that many diverse, unrelated bacteria share. The result is a big genus comprising over 300 species with distinct biochemical characteristics that are not uniquely shared by all members, leaving no way to reliably distinguish Bacillus species from other bacteria. Subsequently, many studies have used phylogenetic analyses as a means to clarify the evolutionary relationships between Bacillus species, resulting in the establishment of many novel genera such as Virgibacillus, Solibacillus, Brevibacillus, and Ectobacillus. Additionally, Bacillus has been restricted to included only species closely related to Bacillus subtilis and Bacillus cereus.

The name Neobacillus is pieced together using the prefix "neo-" (from the Greek adjective neos, translating to new) and the suffix "-bacillus" (from the Latin noun bacillus, referring to a small staff or rod and Bacillus, the bacterial genus). Together, the name translates to "new Bacillus".

== Biochemical Characteristics and Molecular Signatures ==
Members of Neobacillus can be either aerobic or facultatively anaerobic. Motility is variable, some species are motile while others are non-motile. All studied species are observed to form endospores under adverse environmental or nutritional conditions. Neobacillus can be found in a variety of environments, including soil, human origin (gut and skin) and plant roots. Neobacillus can grow in temperatures up to 50-55°C, but optimal growth occurs in the range of 25-37°C.

11 conserved signature indels (CSIs) have been identified through genomic analysis as exclusive for Neobacillus in proteins such as 50S ribosomal protein L24, flagellar M-ring protein FliF, 50S ribosomal protein L11 methyltransferase, imidazole glycerol phosphate synthase subunit HisH, ATP phosphoribosyltransferase regulatory subunit, LTA synthase family protein, type I DNA topoisomerase, nicotinate phosphoribosyltransferase, bifunctional hydroxymethylpyrimidine kinase/phospho- methylpyrimidine kinase, single-stranded-DNA-specific exonuclease RecJ and 1-deoxy-d-xylulose-5-phosphate synthase. These CSIs provide reliable methods to differentiate Neobacillus from other Bacillaceae genera and bacteria in molecular terms.

== Taxonomy ==
As of May 2021, there are a total of 17 species with validly published names in the genus Neobacillus. Members of this genus group together and forms a monophyletic branch in phylogenetic trees created from concatenated sequences from various datasets of conserved proteins as well as 16S rRNA gene sequences. The Genome Taxonomy Database (GTDB) also shows members of Neobacillus grouping together.

Additional phylogenetic studies have identified a number of non-validly published species ("Bacillus ferrooxidans", "Bacillus rubiinfantis", "Bacillus marasmi" and "Bacillus salipaludis") that are considered to be members of this genus based on taxonomic placement in phylogenetic trees as well as shared molecular markers (specifically conserved signature indels) with other members of Neobacillus. However, transfer was not proposed due to the lack of strain culture information. As additional culture information and genome sequences become available in the future, it would be necessary to revisit the taxonomic classifications proposed for this genus to update and validate the results, as done in 2022 for Bacillus dielmonensis.

=== Phylogeny ===
16S rRNA based LTP_10_2024

- - - Peribacillus~1
    - - - - Neobacillus~
            - Neobacillus notoginsengisoli
            - Neobacillus piezotolerans
        - Mesobacillus
      - Mesobacillus~
  - - Neobacillus
      - N. terrae
      - - N. rhizosphaerae
        - - - N. ginsengisoli
            - N. pocheonensis
          - - - - N. kokaensis
                - N. mesonae
              - - - N. drentensis
                  - - N. cucumis
                    - N. jeddahensis
                - - N. bataviensis
                  - - N. soli
                    - - N. novalis
                      - N. vireti
            - - - N. muris
                - - - N. citreus
                    - N. rhizophilus
                  - - N. sedimentimangrovi
                    - N. thermocopriae
              - - N. niacini
                - - N. endophyticus
                  - - N. fumarioli
                    - - N. dielmonensis
                      - N. paridis

120 marker proteins based GTDB 09-RS220

- Neobacillus
  - - N. notoginsengisoli (Zhang et al. 2017) Patel & Gupta 2020
    - N. piezotolerans (Yu et al. 2019) Gupta et al. 2020
  - - N. terrae Han et al. 2023
    - - - - N. thermocopriae (Han et al. 2013) Patel & Gupta 2020 [incl. N. sedimentimangrovi Tang et al. 2022]
          - - N. citreus Liu et al. 2023
            - N. rhizophilus Liu et al. 2023
        - - - - N. dielmonensis (Lo et al. 2021) Kämpfer et al. 2022
              - N. muris Afrizal et al. 2023
            - - N. endophyticus Jiang et al. 2021
              - N. fumarioli (Logan et al. 2000) Patel & Gupta 2020
          - - - N. kokaensis Yuki, Matsubara & Yamaguchi 2022
              - N. mesonae (Liu et al. 2014) Patel & Gupta 2020
            - - "Bacillus renqingensis" Ren et al. 2020
              - - N. paridis Zhan et al. 2023
                - "Bacillus rubiinfantis" Tidjiani Alou et al. 2015
      - - - "N. massiliamazoniensis" Mbaye et al. 2021
          - "Bacillus salipaludis" Xue et al. 2021
        - - - N. niacini (Nagel & Andreesen 1991) Patel & Gupta 2020
            - - N. ginsengisoli (Nguyen et al. 2013) Gupta et al. 2020
              - N. pocheonensis (Ten et al. 2007) Gupta et al. 2020
          - - - N. bataviensis (Heyrman et al. 2004) Patel & Gupta 2020
              - - N. cucumis (Kämpfer et al. 2016) Patel & Gupta 2020
                - N. jeddahensis (Bittar et al. 2017) Patel & Gupta 2020
            - - - N. drentensis (Heyrman et al. 2004) Patel & Gupta 2020
                - N. soli (Heyrman et al. 2004) Patel & Gupta 2020
              - - N. rhizosphaerae Kämpfer et al. 2022
                - - N. novalis (Heyrman et al. 2004) Patel & Gupta 2020
                  - N. vireti (Heyrman et al. 2004) Patel & Gupta 2020

Unassigned species:

- "N. driksii" Hameed et al. 2024
