= Salibacterium lacus =

Scientific classification
- Domain: Bacteria
- Kingdom: Bacillati
- Phylum: Bacillota
- Class: Bacilli
- Order: Bacillales
- Family: Bacillaceae
- Genus: Salibacterium
- Species: S. lacus

Binomial name
- Salibacterium lacus Wang et al. 2018

Type strain
- GSS13, KCTC 33792, MCCC 1K00567

Species of bacterium

Salibacterium lacus is a Gram-positive, strictly aerobic, halophilic, non-spore-former and motile bacterium from the genus of Salibacterium which has been isolated from sediments from the Lake Yuncheng in China.
