= Bacillus mesentericus =

Scientific classification
- Domain: Bacteria
- Kingdom: Bacillati
- Phylum: Bacillota
- Class: Bacilli
- Order: Caryophanales
- Family: Bacillaceae
- Genus: Bacillus
- Species: B. mesentericus

Binomial name
- Bacillus mesentericus Trevisan

Species of bacterium

Bacillus mesentericus is a Gram-positive species of bacteria. Strains of this species may contaminate bread dough, forming a sticky, rope-like texture.

This species has been experimentally explored as a potential probiotic.
