= Bacillus vallismortis =

Scientific classification
- Domain: Bacteria
- Kingdom: Bacillati
- Phylum: Bacillota
- Class: Bacilli
- Order: Bacillales
- Family: Bacillaceae
- Genus: Bacillus
- Species: B. vallismortis

Binomial name
- Bacillus vallismortis Roberts et al. 1996

Species of bacterium

Bacillus vallismortis is a species of bacteria, with type strain DV1-F-3 (5 NRRLB-14890).
