= Bacillus aerius =

Scientific classification
- Domain: Bacteria
- Kingdom: Bacillati
- Phylum: Bacillota
- Class: Bacilli
- Order: Caryophanales
- Family: Bacillaceae
- Genus: Bacillus
- Species: B. aerius

Binomial name
- Bacillus aerius Shivaji et al. 2006

Species of bacterium

Bacillus aerius is a species of bacteria first isolated from cryogenic tubes used for collecting air samples from high altitudes, hence its name. Its type strain is 24K^{T} (=MTCC 7303^{T} =JCM 13348^{T}).
