= Bacillus sonorensis =

Scientific classification
- Domain: Bacteria
- Kingdom: Bacillati
- Phylum: Bacillota
- Class: Bacilli
- Order: Bacillales
- Family: Bacillaceae
- Genus: Bacillus
- Species: B. sonorensis

Binomial name
- Bacillus sonorensis Palmisano et al. 2001

Species of bacterium

Bacillus sonorensis is a species of bacteria with type strain L87-10^{T} (= NRRL B-23154^{T}). Its genome has been sequenced.

== Characteristics of B. sonorensis ==
S.I. Paul et al. (2021) isolated and identified Bacillus sonorensis (strains KSP163A, and OA122) from marine sponges (Haliclona oculata and Cliona carteri, respectively) of the Saint Martin's Island Area of the Bay of Bengal, Bangladesh. Colony, morphological, physiological, and biochemical characteristics of B. sonorensis are shown in the Table below.

| Test type | Test | Characteristics |
|---|---|---|
| Colony characters | Size | Medium |
| Colony characters | Type | Round |
| Colony characters | Color | Creamy |
| Colony characters | Shape | Convex |
| Morphological characters | Shape | Rod |
| Physiological characters | Motility | + |
| Physiological characters | Growth at 6.5% NaCl | + |
| Biochemical characters | Gram's staining | + |
| Biochemical characters | Oxidase | + |
| Biochemical characters | Catalase | – |
| Biochemical characters | Oxidative-Fermentative | Oxidative |
| Biochemical characters | Motility | + |
| Biochemical characters | Methyl Red | + |
| Biochemical characters | Voges-Proskauer | + |
| Biochemical characters | Indole | – |
| Biochemical characters | H_{2}S Production | – |
| Biochemical characters | Urease | – |
| Biochemical characters | Nitrate reductase | + |
| Biochemical characters | β-Galactosidase | W |
| Hydrolysis of | Gelatin | V |
| Hydrolysis of | Aesculin | + |
| Hydrolysis of | Casein | + |
| Hydrolysis of | Tween 40 | + |
| Hydrolysis of | Tween 60 | + |
| Hydrolysis of | Tween 80 | + |
| Acid production from | Glycerol | + |
| Acid production from | Galactose | V |
| Acid production from | D-Glucose | V |
| Acid production from | D-Fructose | + |
| Acid production from | D-Mannose | V |
| Acid production from | Mannitol | + |
| Acid production from | N-Acetylglucosamine | V |
| Acid production from | Amygdalin | V |
| Acid production from | Maltose | + |
| Acid production from | D-Melibiose | V |
| Acid production from | D-Trehalose | + |
| Acid production from | Glycogen | + |
| Acid production from | D-Turanose | W |

Note: + = Positive, – =Negative, W= Weakly Positive, V= Variable (+/–)
