= Evolutionary grade =

Grouping of organisms

Cladogram (family tree) of a biological group. The green box (central) may represent an evolutionary grade (paraphyletic), a group united by conservative anatomical and physiological traits rather than phylogeny. The flanking red and blue boxes are clades (i.e., complete monophyletic subtrees).

A grade is a taxon united by a level of morphological or physiological complexity. The term was coined by British biologist Julian Huxley, to contrast with clade, a strictly phylogenetic unit.

== Phylogenetics ==
The concept of evolutionary grades arises in the context of phylogenetics: the study of the evolutionary history and relationships among or within groups of organisms. These relationships are determined by phylogenetic inference methods that focus on observed heritable traits, such as DNA sequences, protein amino acid sequences, or morphology. The result of such an analysis is a phylogenetic tree—a diagram containing a hypothesis of relationships that reflects the evolutionary history of a group of organisms.

== Definition of an evolutionary grade ==
An evolutionary grade is a group of species united by morphological or physiological traits, that has given rise to another group that has major differences from the ancestral group's condition, and is thus not considered part of the ancestral group, while still having enough similarities that we can group them under the same clade. The ancestral group will not be phylogenetically complete (i.e. is not a clade), and so will represent a paraphyletic taxon.

The most commonly cited example is that of reptiles. In the early 19th century, the French naturalist Latreille was the first to divide tetrapods into the four familiar classes of amphibians, reptiles, birds, and mammals. In this system, reptiles are characterized by traits such as laying membranous or shelled eggs, having skin covered in scales or scutes, and having a cold-blooded metabolism. However, the ancestors of mammals and birds also had these traits and so birds and mammals can be said to "have evolved from reptiles", making the reptiles, when defined by these traits, a grade rather than a clade. In microbiology, taxa that are thus seen as excluded from their evolutionary grade parent group are called taxa in disguise.

Paraphyletic taxa will often, but not always, represent evolutionary grades. In some cases paraphyletic taxa are united simply by not being part of any other groups, and give rise to so-called wastebasket taxa which may even be polyphyletic.

== Grades in systematics ==
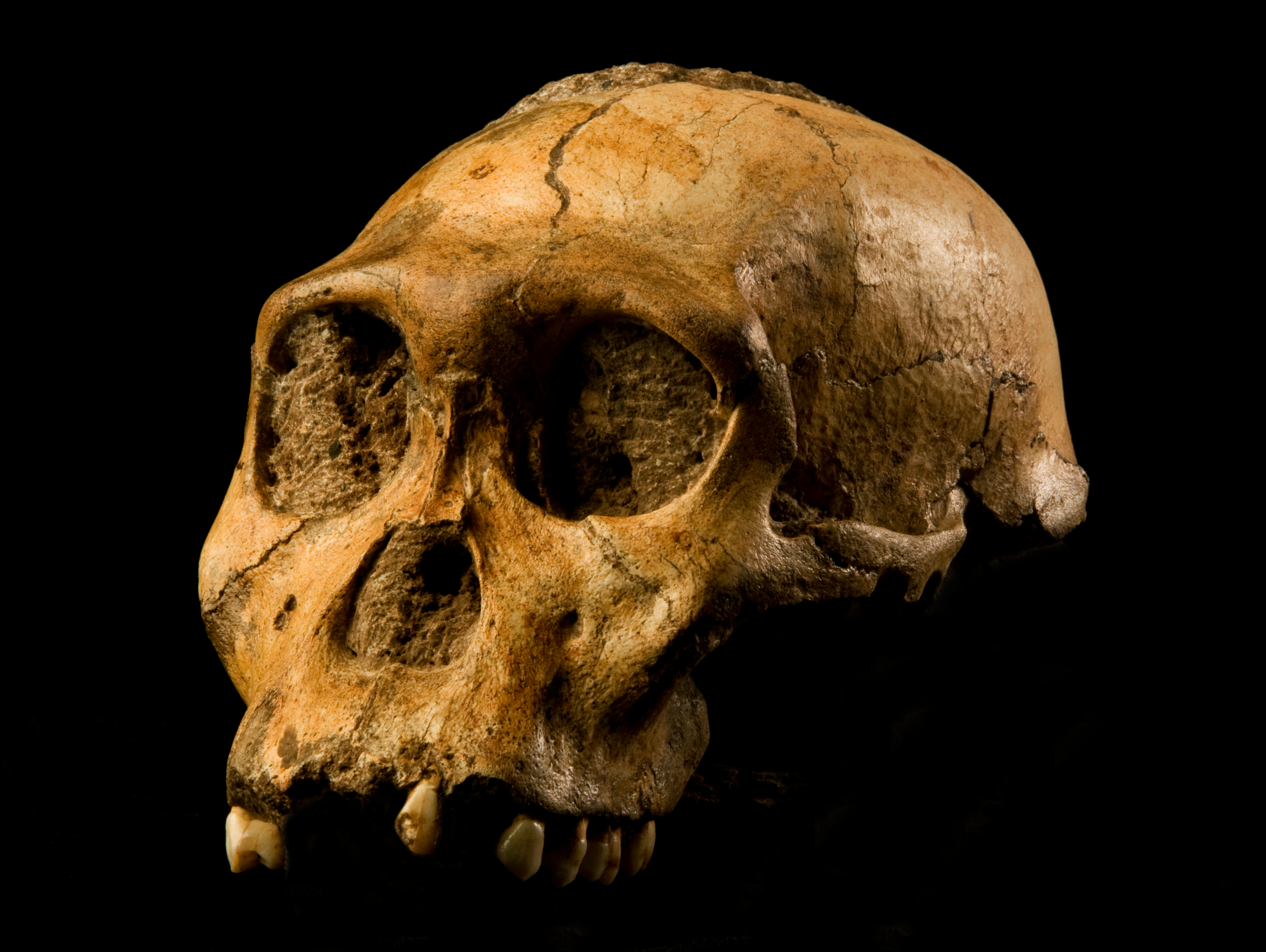
The genus Australopithecus is ancestral to Homo, yet actively in use in palaeoanthropology.

The traditional Linnaean way of defining taxa is through the use of anatomical traits. When the actual phylogenetic relationship is unknown, well defined groups sometimes turn out to be defined by traits that are primitive rather than derived. In Linnaean systematics, evolutionary grades are accepted in higher taxonomic ranks, though generally avoided at family level and below. In phylogenetic nomenclature evolutionary grades (or any other form of paraphyly) are not accepted.

Where information about phylogenetic relationships is available, organisms are preferentially grouped into clades. Where data is lacking, or groups of uncertain relationship are to be compared, the cladistic method is limited and grades provide a useful tool for comparing organisms. This is particularly common in palaeontology, where fossils are often fragmentary and difficult to interpret. Thus, traditional palaeontological works are often using evolutionary grades as formal or informal taxa, including examples such as labyrinthodonts, anapsids, synapsids, dinosaurs, ammonites, eurypterids, lobopodians and many of the more well known taxa of human evolution. Organizing organisms into grades rather than strict clades can also be very useful to understand the evolutionary sequence behind major diversification of both animals and plants.

Evolutionary grades, being united by gross morphological traits, are often eminently recognizable in the field. While taxonomy seeks to eliminate paraphyletic taxa, such grades are sometimes kept as formal or informal groups on the basis of their usefulness for laymen and field researchers. In bacteriology, the renaming of species or groups that turn out to be evolutionary grades is kept to a minimum to avoid misunderstanding, which in the case of pathogens could have fatal consequences. When referring to a group of organisms, the term "grade" is usually enclosed in quotation marks to denote its status as a paraphyletic term.

== Grades and phylogenetic nomenclature ==
With the rise of phylogenetic nomenclature, the use of evolutionary grades as formal taxa has come under debate. Under a strict phylogenetic approach, only monophyletic taxa are recognized. This differs from the more traditional approach of evolutionary taxonomy. The difference in approach has led to a vigorous debate between proponents of the two approaches to taxonomy, particularly in well established fields like vertebrate palaeontology and botany. The difference between the statement "B is part of A" (phylogenetic approach) and "B has evolved from A" (evolutionary approach) is, however, one of semantics rather than of phylogeny. Both express the same phylogeny, but the former emphasizes the phylogenetic continuum while the latter emphasizes a distinct shift in anatomy or ecology in B relative to A.

== Examples ==
- The Basal angiosperms are a grade of ancient orders of plants.
- Fish represent a grade, in as much as they have given rise to the land vertebrates. In turn, the three traditional classes of fish (Agnatha, Chondrichthyes and Osteichthyes) all represent evolutionary grades.
- Amphibians in the biological sense (including the extinct Labyrinthodonts) represent a grade, since they are also the ancestors of the amniotes.
- Reptiles represent a grade composed of the cold-blooded amniotes; this excludes birds and mammals.
- Dinosaurs were proposed to be the ancestors of birds as early as the 1860s. Yet the term sees popular use as an evolutionary grade excluding birds, though most scientists use a monophyletic Dinosauria.
- Lizards represent an evolutionary grade, defined by their retention of limbs relative to snakes and amphisbaenians. However, defining lizards by the presence of limbs is incorrect, as there are many species of legless lizards, which are considered true lizards.
- Green algae represent a grade, since they are the ancestors of land plants.
- Prokaryotes, which include cellular organisms lacking a nucleus, represent a grade, since they are the ancestors of eukaryotes, which includes animals, plants, fungi, and protists; and the last of these four groups also represents a grade, since it excludes the previous three groups.
- Crustaceans represent a grade, since they are the ancestors of hexapods, which includes insects and related taxa.
- Monkeys represent a grade, since they include the ancestors of apes (including humans).
- Likewise, apes represent a grade in common usage, but are a clade if humans are included.
