= Pseudobacillus badius =

Scientific classification
- Domain: Bacteria
- Kingdom: Bacillati
- Phylum: Bacillota
- Class: Bacilli
- Order: Caryophanales
- Family: Bacillaceae
- Genus: Bacillus
- Species: B. badius

Binomial name
- Bacillus badius Batchelor, 1919

Species of bacterium

Bacillus badius is a Gram-positive aerobic spore-forming bacillus. Originally isolated from human intestines and described in 1919, B. badius was later found in a sample of figs. Novel enzymes, including a restriction enzyme and penicillin G acylase, have been purified from this bacterial species.
