= Salibacterium =

Scientific classification
- Domain: Bacteria
- Kingdom: Bacillati
- Phylum: Bacillota
- Class: Bacilli
- Order: Bacillales
- Family: Bacillaceae
- Genus: Salibacterium; Reddy et al. 2015

Type species
- Salibacterium halotolerans Reddy et al. 2015

Species
- S. aidingense; S. halochares; S. halotolerans; S. lacus; S. nitratireducens; S. qingdaonense; S. salarium

Genus of bacteria

Salibacterium is a genus of Gram-positive bacteria from the family Bacillaceae. The type species is Salibacterium halotolerans.

Salibacterium aidingense and Salibacterium salarium were previously species belonging to Bacillus, a genus that has been recognized as displaying extensive polyphyly and has been restricted by recent phylogenetic studies to only include species closely related to Bacillus subtilis and Bacillus cereus.

The name Salibacterium is derived from the prefix "-sali" (from the Latin noun sal/salis, which translates to "salt"), and the suffix "-bacterium" (from the Latin noun bacterium, referring to a rod). Together, Salibacterium translates to a rod from salt.

== Biochemical Characteristics and molecular signatures ==
Members of this genus are aerobic or facultatively anaerobic. Most members are non-motile, except S. aidingense which exhibits motility by means of peritrichous flagella. Some members form endospores. All of the members require salt for growth with optimal growth occurring in the presence of 10–12% (w/v) NaCl. Temperature range for growth is 15–45°C, with optimum growth temperature in the range 30-37°C.

Nine conserved signature indels (CSIs) were identified for this genus in the following proteins: GTP-binding protein, CoA-binding protein, nucleoside triphosphatase YtkD, protease modulator HflC, dihydrolipoyl dehydrogenase, DUF3603 family protein, M20/M25/M40 family metallohydrolase, exonuclease SbcCD subunit D and l-arabinose isomerase, which in most cases are exclusively shared by either all or most members of this genus. These CSIs were identified through analyses of genome sequences from Salibacterium species and provide a reliable molecular means of differentiating this genus from other Bacillaceae genera and bacteria.

== Phylogeny ==
Salibacterium, as of May 2021, contains a total of 7 species with validly published names. The currently accepted taxonomy is based on the List of Prokaryotic names with Standing in Nomenclature (LPSN) and National Center for Biotechnology Information (NCBI).

16S rRNA based LTP_10_2024

- Salibacterium
  - S. salarium (Lim et al. 2006) Gupta et al. 2020
  - - S. aidingense (Xue et al. 2008) Gupta et al. 2020
    - - - S. halochares (Pappa et al. 2010) Reddy et al. 2015
        - S. nitratireducens Singh et al. 2018
      - - S. halotolerans Reddy et al. 2015
        - - S. lacus Wang et al. 2018
          - S. qingdaonense (Wang et al. 2007) Reddy et al. 2015

120 marker proteins based GTDB 09-RS220

- Salibacterium
  - S. salarium
  - - S. aidingense
    - - S. halotolerans
      - S. qingdaonense
