= Anaerobacillus =

Scientific classification
- Domain: Bacteria
- Kingdom: Bacillati
- Phylum: Bacillota
- Class: Bacilli
- Order: Bacillales
- Family: Bacillaceae
- Genus: Anaerobacillus; Zavarzina et al. 2010

Type species
- Anaerobacillus arseniciselenatis (Switzer Blum et al. 2001) Zavarzina et al. 2010

Species
- A. alkalidiazotrophicus; A. alkalilacustris; A. alkaliphilus; A. arseniciselenatis; A. isosaccharinicus; "A. macyae"

Genus of bacteria

Anaerobacillus is a genus of bacteria from the family of Bacillaceae.

== Phylogeny ==
The currently accepted taxonomy is based on the List of Prokaryotic names with Standing in Nomenclature (LPSN) and National Center for Biotechnology Information (NCBI).

16S rRNA based LTP_10_2024

- Anaerobacillus
  - - A. alkaliphilus Borsodi et al. 2019
    - A. isosaccharinicus Bassil & Lloyd 2018
  - - "A. macyae" (Santini, Streimann & vanden Hoven 2004) Zavarzina et al. 2009
    - - A. arseniciselenatis (Switzer Blum et al. 2001) Zavarzina et al. 2010
      - - A. alkalilacustris Zavarzina et al. 2010
        - A. alkalidiazotrophicus (Sorokin et al. 2008) Zavarzina et al. 2010

120 marker proteins based GTDB 09-RS220

- Anaerobacillus
  - A. arseniciselenatis
  - - - A. alkaliphilus
      - A. isosaccharinicus
    - - A. alkalilacustris
      - A. alkalidiazotrophicus

== See also ==
- List of Bacteria genera
- List of bacterial orders
