= Alkalicoccus urumqiensis =

Scientific classification
- Domain: Bacteria
- Kingdom: Bacillati
- Phylum: Bacillota
- Class: Bacilli
- Order: Bacillales
- Family: Bacillaceae
- Genus: Alkalicoccus
- Species: A. urumqiensis

Binomial name
- Alkalicoccus urumqiensis (Zhang et al. 2016) Gupta et al. 2020

Type strain
- BZ-SZ-XJ18

Synonyms
- Bacillus urumqiensis

Species of bacterium

Alkalicoccus urumqiensis is a Gram-positive, rod-shaped, moderately haloalkaliphilic and aerobic bacterium from the genus Alkalicoccus.
