= Bacillus albus =

Scientific classification
- Domain: Bacteria
- Kingdom: Bacillati
- Phylum: Bacillota
- Class: Bacilli
- Order: Bacillales
- Family: Bacillaceae
- Genus: Bacillus
- Species: B. albus

Binomial name
- Bacillus albus Liu et al. 2017

Species of bacterium

Bacillus albus is a gram positive, rod shaped species of bacteria. S.I. Paul et al. (2021) isolated and characterized Bacillus albus from marine sponge of the Saint Martin's Island of the Bay of Bengal, Bangladesh. Type strain of Bacillus albus sp. nov. is N35-10-2T (=MCCC 1A02146T=KCTC 33710T=LMG 28875T)
