= Bacillus coahuilensis =

Scientific classification
- Domain: Bacteria
- Kingdom: Bacillati
- Phylum: Bacillota
- Class: Bacilli
- Order: Bacillales
- Family: Bacillaceae
- Genus: Bacillus
- Species: B. coahuilensis

Binomial name
- Bacillus coahuilensis Cerritos et al., 2008

Species of bacterium

Bacillus coahuilensis is a rod-shaped, Gram-positive, motile, spore-forming bacterium. A moderate halophile, this species was isolated in 2008 from water samples taken from a highly saline desert lagoon in Coahuila, Mexico.
