= Niallia tiangongensis =

Scientific classification
- Domain: Bacteria
- Kingdom: Bacillati
- Phylum: Bacillota
- Class: Bacilli
- Order: Caryophanales
- Family: Bacillaceae
- Genus: Niallia
- Species: N. tiangongensis

Binomial name
- Niallia tiangongensis Yuan et al. 2025

Bacterial species discovered aboard China's Tiangong space station in 2023

Niallia tiangongensis is a Gram-positive, aerobic, spore-forming, rod-shaped bacterium belonging to the genus Niallia within the family Bacillaceae. It was first isolated from surface samples collected aboard the Tiangong space station during China's Shenzhou 15 mission in May 2023. The species was formally described in 2025 following genomic and phenotypic analyses.

== Discovery ==
Samples leading to the identification of N. tiangongensis were obtained from the surface of hardware within the Tiangong space station as part of the China Space Station Habitation Area Microbiome Program (CHAMP). The collected samples were returned to Earth for analysis, where the strain was isolated and characterized.

The species is particularly adept at metabolizing gelatin.

== See also ==
- Tiangong space station
- Niallia
