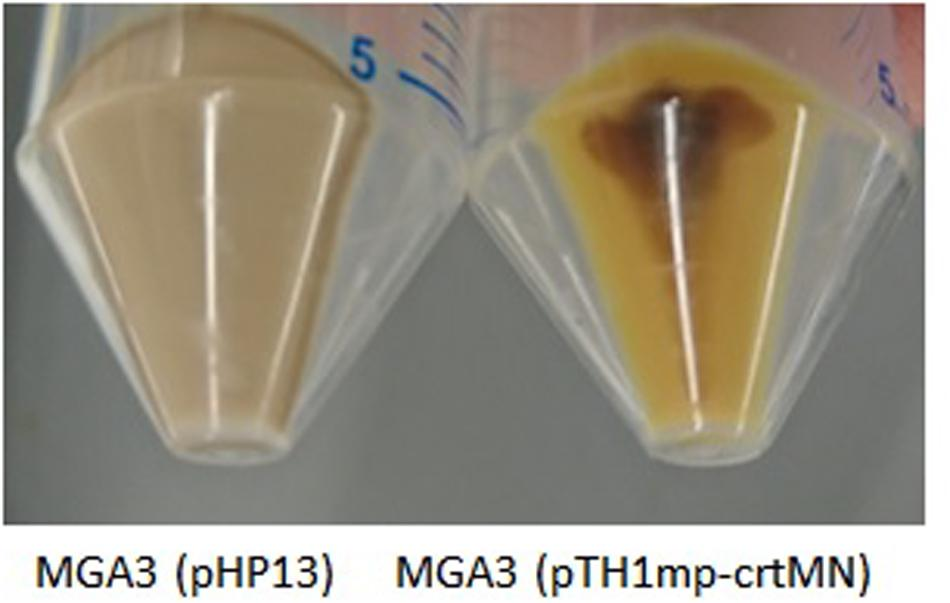
- Cell pellets of recombinant B. methanolicus MGA3 (pHP13) and MGA3 (pTH1mp-crtMN) strains cultivated in SWE50 medium.

Scientific classification
- Domain: Bacteria
- Kingdom: Bacillati
- Phylum: Bacillota
- Class: Bacilli
- Order: Bacillales
- Family: Bacillaceae
- Genus: Bacillus
- Species: B. methanolicus

Binomial name
- Bacillus methanolicus Arfman, 1992

= Bacillus methanolicus =

Species of bacterium

Bacillus methanolicus is a gram positive, thermophilic, methylotrophic member of the genus Bacillus. The most well characterized strain of the species, Bacillus methanolicus MGA3, was isolated from freshwater marsh soils, and grows rapidly in cultures heated to up to 60 °C using only methanol as a carbon source. The genome of B. methanolicus MGA3 was fully sequenced in 2014, revealing a 3,337,035 bp linear chromosome and two natural plasmids, pBM19 and pBM69.

== Chemical production from methanol ==
Researchers are currently investigating the use of B. methanolicus MGA3 for production of chemicals such as L-glutamate, L-lysine, cadaverine and gamma-aminobutyric acid from methanol.

== Synthetic methylotrophy ==
The methylotrophic metabolism of B. methanolicus is being explored for establishing synthetic methylotrophy in other organisms. Recombinant expression of the pentose phosphate pathway from B. methanolicus in E. coli has shown promise in creating synthetically methylotrophic E. coli.
