= Fictibacillus phosphorivorans =

Scientific classification
- Domain: Bacteria
- Kingdom: Bacillati
- Phylum: Bacillota
- Class: Bacilli
- Order: Bacillales
- Family: Bacillaceae
- Genus: Fictibacillus
- Species: F. phosphorivorans

Binomial name
- Fictibacillus phosphorivorans Glaeser et al. 2013

Type strain
- Ca7, CCM 8426, LMG 27063

Synonyms
- Fictibacillus phoshorivorans

Species of bacterium

Fictibacillus phosphorivorans is a Gram-positive, aerobic and spore-forming bacterium from the genus Fictibacillus.
