= Mesobacillus =

Scientific classification
- Domain: Bacteria
- Kingdom: Bacillati
- Phylum: Bacillota
- Class: Bacilli
- Order: Caryophanales
- Family: Bacillaceae
- Genus: Mesobacillus; Patel and Gupta 2020

Type species
- Mesobacillus jeotgali (Yoon et al. 2001) Patel & Gupta 2020

Species
- See text

Bacteria in the family Bacillaceae

Mesobacillus is a genus of gram-positive or gram-variable, rod-shaped bacteria in the family Bacillaceae within the order Bacillales. The type species for this genus is Mesobacillus jeotgali.

Members of Mesobacillus was transferred from the genus Bacillus. Bacillus is a large, phylogenetically complicated genus, with unclear interspecies evolutionary relationships due to the vague criteria used to assign species into the genus. The efforts of multiple phylogenetic and comparative genomics analyses studies have transferred many Bacillus species into novel genera such as Virgibacillus, Solibacillus, Brevibacillus and Ectobacillus. The genus itself has also been emended and restricted to only include species closely related to Bacillus subtilis and Bacillus cereus.

The name Mesobacillus is derived from its taxonomic position in phylogenetic trees. The prefix "meso-" comes from the Greek adjective mesos, and translates to "middle". Bacillus comes from the Latin noun bacillus, referring to both 'a small staff or rod' and Bacillus, the bacterial genus. Put together, the name Mesobacillus refers to a genus in between other Bacillus.

== Biochemical characteristics and molecular signatures ==
Members of the genus Mesobacillus are either aerobic or facultatively anaerobic. They mostly demonstrate endospore formation under adverse environmental or nutritional conditions. Species can be found in a variety of environments, ranging from soil, human gut, groundwater, wastewater systems, hypersalinic lakes and thermal aquifers. Cells can be either motile or non-motile. Some specific species are high salt tolerant and even require high salt concentration for growth (ie. Mesobacillus persicus). Mesobacillus can survive in temperatures ranging from 10°C to 45°C, but optimal growth occurs in the range of 25-37°C.

Genome sequence analyses have identified three conserved signature indels (CSIs) uniquely found in members of Mesobacillus in the proteins PhoH family protein, TrkA family potassium uptake protein and a hypothetical protein. These molecular markers provide a reliable means to distinguish Mesobacillus species from other Bacillaceae genera and bacteria.

== Taxonomy ==
As of May 2021, there are a total of 14 species with validly published names in the genus Mesobacillus. In phylogenetic trees constructed based on concatenated sequences from various datasets of conserved proteins and 16S rRNA sequences, members of this genus group together and forms a monophyletic branch. This grouping is also reflected n the Genome Taxonomy Database (GTDB).

The non-validly published species "Bacillus mediterraneensis" has been found to branch with other members of Mesobacillus as well as share molecular markers unique to the clade. However, transfer of these species into Mesobacillus was not proposed due to the lack of strain culture information. This indicates the requirement for additional analyses of this clade as more genomic and strain information become available.

=== Phylogeny ===
16S rRNA based LTP_10_2024

- - - Neobacillus~
    - - Mesobacillus
        - - M. stamsii (Müller et al. 2016) Patel & Gupta 2020
          - M. thioparans (Pérez-Ibarra, Flores &Garcia-Varela 2007) Patel & Gupta
        - - M. subterraneus (Kanso, Greene & Patel 2002) Patel & Gupta 2020
          - - M. jeotgali (Yoon et al. 2001) Patel & Gupta 2020
            - - M. boroniphilus (Ahmed, Yokota & Fujiwara 2007) Patel & Gupta 2020
              - M. selenatarsenatis (Yamamura et al. 2007) Patel & Gupta 2020
  - - Mesobacillus~
      - - Mesobacillus harenae Zhang et al. 2021
        - - Mesobacillus campisalis (Kumar et al. 2015) Patel & Gupta 2020
          - Mesobacillus zeae (Kämpfer et al. 2017) Patel & Gupta 2020
      - - Mesobacillus foraminis (Tiago et al. 2006) Patel & Gupta 2020
        - - Mesobacillus maritimus (Pal et al. 2017) Patel & Gupta 2020
          - - Mesobacillus persicus (Didari et al. 2013) Patel & Gupta 2020
            - - Mesobacillus fermenti (Hirota et al. 2018) Gupta et al. 2020
              - Mesobacillus rigiliprofundi (Sylvan et al. 2015) Patel & Gupta 2020

120 marker proteins based GTDB 09-RS220

- Mesobacillus
  - M. harenae
  - - - M. subterraneus
      - - M. stamsii
        - - M. selenatarsenatis
          - - M. boroniphilus
            - M. jeotgali
    - - - M. zeae
        - "M. mediterraneensis" Patel & Gupta 2020
      - - M. foraminis
        - - M. campisalis
          - - M. maritimus
            - M. persicus

Unassgined species:

- "M. aurantius" Rai et al. 2021
