= Fictibacillus halophilus =

Scientific classification
- Domain: Bacteria
- Kingdom: Bacillati
- Phylum: Bacillota
- Class: Bacilli
- Order: Bacillales
- Family: Bacillaceae
- Genus: Fictibacillus
- Species: F. halophilus

Binomial name
- Fictibacillus halophilus Sharma et al. 2016

Type strain
- DSM 100124, AS8, KCTC 33758, MCC 2765

Species of bacterium

Fictibacillus halophilus is a moderately halophilic, Gram-positive, spore-forming and motile bacterium from the genus Fictibacillus which has been isolated from microbial mat from a hot spring in Manikaran in India.
