= Salibacterium halotolerans =

Scientific classification
- Domain: Bacteria
- Kingdom: Bacillati
- Phylum: Bacillota
- Class: Bacilli
- Order: Bacillales
- Family: Bacillaceae
- Genus: Salibacterium
- Species: S. halotolerans

Binomial name
- Salibacterium halotolerans Vishnuvardhan et al. 2015

Type strain
- IB5, CGMCC 1.15324, S7(2015), KCTC 33658

Species of bacterium

Salibacterium halotolerans is a bacterium from the genus of Salibacterium.
