= Psychrobacillus soli =

Scientific classification
- Domain: Bacteria
- Kingdom: Bacillati
- Phylum: Bacillota
- Class: Bacilli
- Order: Bacillales
- Family: Bacillaceae
- Genus: Psychrobacillus
- Species: P. soli

Binomial name
- Psychrobacillus soli Pham et al. 2015

Type strain
- KACC 18243, KEMB 9005-135, NBRC 110600, NHI-2

Species of bacterium

Psychrobacillus soli is a Gram-positive, endospore-forming, psychrotolerant and aerobic bacterium from the genus of Psychrobacillus which has been isolated from oil contaminated soil. Psychrobacillus soli has the ability to degrade oil.
