= Sutcliffiella halmapala =

Scientific classification
- Domain: Bacteria
- Kingdom: Bacillati
- Phylum: Bacillota
- Class: Bacilli
- Order: Caryophanales
- Family: Bacillaceae
- Genus: Bacillus
- Species: B. halmapalus

Binomial name
- Bacillus halmapalus Nielsen et al. 1995

Species of bacterium

Bacillus halmapalus is a facultative anaerobe bacterium. It is a gram positive, alkaliphilic and alkalitolerant, aerobic endospore-forming bacteria.
