= Alteribacillus bidgolensis =

Scientific classification
- Domain: Bacteria
- Kingdom: Bacillati
- Phylum: Bacillota
- Class: Bacilli
- Order: Bacillales
- Family: Marinococcaceae
- Genus: Alteribacillus
- Species: A. bidgolensis

Binomial name
- Alteribacillus bidgolensis Didari et al. 2012

Type strain
- CCM 7963, CECT 7998, DSM 25260, IBRC-M 10614, KCTC 13821, LMG 26600, P4B

Species of bacterium

Alteribacillus bidgolensis is a Gram-positive, moderately halophilic and non-motile bacterium from the genus of Alteribacillus which has been isolated from water from the Aran-Bidgol lake in Iran.
