= Fictibacillus enclensis =

Scientific classification
- Domain: Bacteria
- Kingdom: Bacillati
- Phylum: Bacillota
- Class: Bacilli
- Order: Bacillales
- Family: Bacillaceae
- Genus: Fictibacillus
- Species: F. enclensis

Binomial name
- Fictibacillus enclensis Dastager et al. 2014

Type strain
- DSM 25142, NCIM 5458, NIO-1003

Species of bacterium

Fictibacillus enclensis is a Gram-positive, strictly aerobic, spore-forming and motile bacterium from the genus Fictibacillus which has been isolated from marine sediments from the Chorão Island in India.
