= Bacillus nealsonii =

Scientific classification
- Domain: Bacteria
- Kingdom: Bacillati
- Phylum: Bacillota
- Class: Bacilli
- Order: Caryophanales
- Family: Bacillaceae
- Genus: Bacillus
- Species: B. nealsonii

Binomial name
- Bacillus nealsonii Venkateswaran et al. 2003

Species of bacterium

Bacillus nealsonii is a species of bacteria first isolated from a spacecraft-assembly facility. Its spores are γ-radiation resistant. It is Gram-positive, facultatively anaerobic, rod-shaped and produces endospores. Its type strain is FO-92^{T} (=ATCC BAA-519^{T} =DSM 15077^{T}).

This species has been recently transferred into the genus Niallia. The correct nomenclature is Niallia nealsonii.
