= Alteribacillus alkaliphilus =

Scientific classification
- Domain: Bacteria
- Kingdom: Bacillati
- Phylum: Bacillota
- Class: Bacilli
- Order: Bacillales
- Family: Marinococcaceae
- Genus: Alteribacillus
- Species: A. alkaliphilus

Binomial name
- Alteribacillus alkaliphilus Azmatunnisa Begum et al. 2016

Type strain
- JC229, KCTC 33726, LMG 28999

Species of bacterium

Alteribacillus alkaliphilus is a Gram-positive, aerobic spore-forming, rod-shaped and non-motile bacterium from the genus of Alteribacillus which has been isolated from water from alkaline soil.
