= Fictibacillus macauensis =

Scientific classification
- Domain: Bacteria
- Kingdom: Bacillati
- Phylum: Bacillota
- Class: Bacilli
- Order: Bacillales
- Family: Bacillaceae
- Genus: Fictibacillus
- Species: F. macauensis

Binomial name
- Fictibacillus macauensis (Zhang et al. 2006) Glaeser et al. 2013

Type strain
- CIP 109160, DSM 17262, JCM 13285, ZFHKF-1

Synonyms
- Bacillus macauensis

Species of bacterium

Fictibacillus macauensis is a Gram-positive, rod-shaped and spore-forming bacterium from the genus Fictibacillus which has been isolated from a drinking water supply from Macau in China.
