= Alkalicoccus halolimnae =

Scientific classification
- Domain: Bacteria
- Kingdom: Bacillati
- Phylum: Bacillota
- Class: Bacilli
- Order: Bacillales
- Family: Bacillaceae
- Genus: Alkalicoccus
- Species: A. halolimnae

Binomial name
- Alkalicoccus halolimnae Zhao et al. 2017

Type strain
- BZ-SZ-XJ29

Species of bacterium

Alkalicoccus halolimnae is a Gram-positive, cocci-shaped, non-spore-forming and moderately halophilic bacterium from the genus Alkalicoccus which has been isolated from a salt lake in China.
