= Niallia =

Scientific classification
- Domain: Bacteria
- Kingdom: Bacillati
- Phylum: Bacillota
- Class: Bacilli
- Order: Caryophanales
- Family: Bacillaceae
- Genus: Niallia; Gupta et al. 2020

Type species
- Niallia circulans (Jordan 1890) Gupta et al. 2020

Species
- "N. alba"; N. circulans; N. endozanthoxylica; "N. hominis"; N. nealsonii; N. oryzisoli; N. taxi; N. tiangongensis

Genus of bacteria

Niallia is a genus of Gram-Positive rod-shaped bacteria in the family Bacillaceae from the order Bacillales. The type species of this genus is Niallia circulans.

Members of Niallia are previously species belonging to Bacillus, a genus that has long been recognized by the scientific community as displaying extensive polyphyly and phylogenetic heterogeneity due to the vague criteria previously used to assign species to this clade. Multiple studies using comparative phylogenetic analyses have been published in an attempt to clarify the evolutionary relationships between Bacillus species, resulting in the establishment of numerous novel genera such as Alkalihalobacillus, Brevibacillus, Solibacillus, Alicyclobacillus, Virgibacillus and Evansella. In addition, the genus Bacillus has been restricted to only include species closely related to Bacillus subtilis and Bacillus cereus.

The name Niallia was named after the British microbiologist Professor Niall A. Logan (Glasgow Caledonian University), for his many contributions to the systematics and uses of the members of the genus Bacillus.

== Biochemical characteristics and molecular signatures ==
Members of this genus are facultatively anaerobic and found in diverse locations such as soil, sewage, food and human stool. All members are motile and produce endospores. The optimal growth temperature for Niallia is in the range of 30-37°C. Niallia circulans is an important bacterium used in aquaculture, bioremediation, water treatment and enzyme production. It is also an opportunistic pathogen that is able to cause sepsis in immunocompromised patients. Two conserved signature indels (CSIs) have been identified as unique for this genus in the proteins GAF domain-containing protein and DNA ligase D, which in most cases are exclusively shared by either all or most members of this genus. These CSIs were identified through analyses of genome sequences from Niallia species and provide a reliable means to distinguish Niallia from other Bacillaceae genera and bacteria in molecular terms.

== Taxonomy ==
Niallia, as of May 2021, contains a total of 5 species with validly published names. This genus was identified as a monophyletic clade and phylogenetically unrelated to other Bacillus species in studies examining the taxonomic relationships within Bacillus. This branching pattern is also observed in the Genome Taxonomy Database (GTDB).

A non-validly published species, "Bacillus tuaregi", is also found to group with other members of Niallia in phylogenetic trees as well as share the same molecular markers in the form of conserved signature indels (CSIs). However, its transfer was not officially proposed due to the lack of culture strain information. Further revision of this genus is required as additional genomes and novel species are discovered and assigned.

=== Phylogeny ===
16S rRNA based LTP_10_2024

- - Bacillus benzoevorans Pichinoty, Asselineau & Mandel 1987
  - - Niallia
      - N. endozanthoxylica (Ma et al. 2017) Gupta et al. 2020
      - - N. oryzisoli (Zhang et al. 2016) Gupta et al. 2020
        - - N. circulans (Jordan 1890) Gupta et al. 2020
          - - N. nealsonii (Venkateswaran et al. 2003) Gupta et al. 2020
            - N. taxi (Tuo et al. 2020) Gupta et al. 2020

120 marker proteins based GTDB 09-RS220

- - Bacillus_BD
    - Bacillus benzoevorans
    - - Niallia endozanthoxylica (Ma et al. 2017) Gupta et al. 2020
      - "Bacillus tuaregi" Cadoret et al. 2017
  - Niallia
    - N. taxi
    - - N. nealsonii
      - - "N. alba" Thorat et al. 2022
        - N. circulans

== See also ==
- List of Bacteria genera
- List of bacterial orders
