= Psychrobacillus =

Pseudogracilibacillus

Scientific classification
- Domain: Bacteria
- Kingdom: Bacillati
- Phylum: Bacillota
- Class: Bacilli
- Order: Bacillales
- Family: Bacillaceae
- Genus: Psychrobacillus; Krishnamurthi et al. 2011

Type species
- Psychrobacillus insolitus (Larkin & Stokes 1967) Krishnamurthi et al. 2011

Species
- P. antarcticus; "P. faecigallinarum"; P. glaciei; P. insolitus; P. lasiicapitis; P. mangrovi; P. psychrodurans; P. psychrotolerans; P. soli; P. vulpis

Genus of bacteria

Psychrobacillus is a genus of bacteria from the family of Bacillaceae.

== Phylogeny ==
The currently accepted taxonomy is based on the List of Prokaryotic names with Standing in Nomenclature (LPSN) and National Center for Biotechnology Information (NCBI)

16S rRNA based LTP_10_2024

- Psychrobacillus
  - - P. vulpis
    - - P. lasiicapitis
      - P. soli
  - - - P. glaciei
      - P. insolitus
    - - P. antarcticus
      - - P. psychrodurans
        - P. psychrotolerans

120 marker proteins based GTDB 09-RS220

- Psychrobacillus
  - "P. faecigallinarum" Gilroy et al. 2021
  - - - P. lasiicapitis Shen et al. 2017
      - P. soli Pham, Jeong & Kim 2015
    - - - P. glaciei Choi & Lee 2020
        - P. vulpis Rodríguez et al. 2020
      - - P. insolitus (Larkin & Stokes 1967) Krishnamurthi et al. 2011
        - - P. psychrodurans (Abd El-Rahman et al. 2002) Krishnamurthi et al. 2011
          - P. psychrotolerans (Abd El-Rahman et al. 2002) Krishnamurthi et al. 2011

== See also ==
- List of bacterial orders
- List of bacteria genera
