= Metabacillus =

Scientific classification
- Domain: Bacteria
- Kingdom: Bacillati
- Phylum: Bacillota
- Class: Bacilli
- Order: Bacillales
- Family: Bacillaceae
- Genus: Metabacillus; Patel and Gupta 2020

Type species
- Metabacillus fastidiosus (den Dooren de Jong 1929) Patel & Gupta 2020

Species
- See text

Genus of bacteria

Metabacillus is a genus of rod-shaped bacteria exhibiting Gram-positive or Gram-variable staining in the family Bacillaceae within the order Bacillales. The type species for this genus is Metabacillus fastidiosus.

This genus was demarcated from the phylogenetically complicated genus Bacillus, whose unclear evolutionary relationships have been long been under scrutiny by the scientific community. The polyphyletic nature of the genus Bacillus is partly due to the vague criteria used to assign novel bacteria to this genus, resulting in an agglomeration of phylogenetically unrelated bacteria with a diverse range of biochemical characteristics. Comparative genomic studies and phylogenetic analyses have been published to clarify the complicated relationships within this genus resulting in the transfer of many Bacillus species into novel genera such as Alkalihalobacillus, Virigibacillus, Brevibacillus, Solibacillus and Peribacillus. In addition, the genus itself has been restricted to only include species closely related to its type species, Bacillus subtilis as well as Bacillus cereus.

The name Metabacillus is derived from its taxonomic position identified through phylogenetic trees. The prefix "meta-" comes from the Greek adjective meta, and translates to "beside". Bacillus comes from the Latin noun bacillus, referring to both 'a small staff or rod' and Bacillus, the bacterial genus. Put together, the name Metabacillus refers to a genus besides Bacillus.

== Biochemical characteristics and molecular signatures ==
All members of the genus Metabacillus are aerobic and demonstrates endospore formation. These bacteria can be found in a wide range of environments, from hypersaline lakes, coastal marine regions and soil. While some species are non-motile, most Metabacillus species are motile. Some species are moderately salt tolerant and able to live in saline environments such as coastal regions. Metabacillus can survive in temperatures ranging 4–45 °C (39–113 °F), but optimal growth occurs in the range of 25–37 °C (77–99 °F).

Six conserved signature indels (CSIs) have been identified as specific for Metabacillus species in proteins such as 3-phosphoshikimate-1-carboxyvinyltransferase, fibronectin/fibrinogen-binding protein, spore protease YyaC, and DEAD/DEAH box helicase. These CSIs were identified through the analysis of genome sequences from Metabacillus species and provide a reliable means to distinguish Metabacillus from other Bacillaceae genera in molecular terms.

== Taxonomy ==
As of May 2021, there are a total of 15 species with validly published names in the genus Metabacillus. Members of this genus group together and forms a monophyletic branch in phylogenetic trees created from concatenated sequences from various datasets of conserved proteins. This monophyletic clade is also found in the Genome Taxonomy Database (GTDB).

Additional phylogenetic studies have identified the species Bacillus weihaiensis as a member of Metabacillus based on taxonomic placement in phylogenetic trees as well as shared molecular markers (specifically conserved signature indels) with other members of Metabacillus. However, transfer was not proposed due to the lack of strain culture information. As Bacillus continues to be a fast growing genus with the frequent addition of novel species and sequenced genomes, it would be necessary to continually update and validate previous classification proposals.

=== Phylogeny ===
16S rRNA based LTP_10_2024

- Bacillaceae~9
  - Metabacillus galliciensis (Balcazar, Pintado &Planas 2010) Patel & Gupta 2020
  - Bacillus

- Metabacillus iocasae (Wang, Zhang & Sun 2017) Gupta et al. 2020

- Bacillaceae~3
  - - Litchfieldia
    - - Metabacillus
        - M. herbersteinensis (Wieser et al. 2005) Patel & Gupta 2020
        - - M. fastidiosus (den Dooren de Jong 1929) Patel & Gupta 2020
          - - M. endolithicus (Parag, Sasikala & Ramana 2015) Patel & Gupta 2020
            - - - M. bambusae Jeong, Kim & Kim 2022
                - M. crassostreae (Chen et al. 2015) Patel & Gupta 2020
              - - M. halosaccharovorans (Mehrshad et al. 2013) Patel & Gupta 2020
                - - - M. litoralis (Yoon & Oh 2005) Patel & Gupta 2020
                    - M. sediminilitoris Mao et al. 2020
                  - - M. schmidteae Kangale et al. 2021
                    - - M. malikii (Abbas et al. 2016) Patel & Gupta 2020
                      - M. niabensis (Kwon et al. 2007) Patel & Gupta 2020
  - - - - Metabacillus~
          - Metabacillus lacus (Singh et al. 2018) Gupta et al. 2020
          - - Metabacillus arenae Fang et al. 2023
            - - - Metabacillus idriensis (Ko et al. 2006) Gupta et al. 2020
                - Metabacillus indicus (Suresh et al. 2004) Patel & Gupta 2020
              - - Metabacillus kandeliae Cai et al. 2022
                - - Metabacillus flavus Hwang et al. 2022
                  - Metabacillus mangrovi (Gupta et al. 2017) Gupta et al. 2020
      - other
    - other

120 marker proteins based GTDB 09-RS220

- - - Bacillus_P
      - Metabacillus indicus
      - - "Metabacillus dongyingensis" Yin et al. 2022
        - Metabacillus idriensis
    - Metabacillus
      - M. fastidiosus
      - - - M. malikii
          - M. niabensis
        - - - M. bambusae
            - - "M. rhizolycopersici" Ma et al. 2022
              - M. sediminilitoris
          - - - M. endolithicus
              - - M. halosaccharovorans
                - M. schmidteae
            - - "Bacillus weihaiensis" Zhu et al. 2016
              - - M. crassostreae
                - M. litoralis
  - - - Metabacillus lacus
      - - Metabacillus_B
          - Metabacillus kandeliae
          - - Metabacillus flavus
            - Metabacillus mangrovi
    - - Metabacillus arenae
      - Bacillus

Unassigned species:

- "M. elymi" Lee et al. 2021
- M. rhizosphaerae Liu et al. 2025
- M. sediminis Liu et al. 2025
