= Neobacillus fumarioli =

Scientific classification
- Domain: Bacteria
- Kingdom: Bacillati
- Phylum: Bacillota
- Class: Bacilli
- Order: Caryophanales
- Family: Bacillaceae
- Genus: Bacillus
- Species: B. fumarioli

Binomial name
- Bacillus fumarioli Logan et al. 2000

Species of bacterium

Bacillus fumarioli is a species of aerobic endospore-forming bacteria. It is moderately thermophilic and acidophilic, with type strain LMG 17489^{T}.

This species has been recently transferred into the genus Neobacillus. The correct nomenclature is Neobacillus fumarioli.
