= Metabacillus fastidiosus =

Scientific classification
- Domain: Bacteria
- Kingdom: Bacillati
- Phylum: Bacillota
- Class: Bacilli
- Order: Caryophanales
- Family: Bacillaceae
- Genus: Metabacillus
- Species: M. fastidiosus

Binomial name
- Metabacillus fastidiosus den Dooren de Jong 1929 (Approved Lists 1980)

Species of bacterium

Metabacillus fastidiosus is an aerobic, motile, rod-shaped bacterium that has been isolated from soil and poultry litter. The species was first isolated and described by the scientist Den Dooren de Jong in 1929. This organism is a mesophile that contains ellipsoidal spores that do not cause swelling of the sporangia. Metabacillus fastidiosus is only able to grow in the presence of uric acid, allantoin, or allantoic acid.

This species was formerly classified as Bacillus fastidiosus.

== Morphology ==
Metabacillus fastidiosus has peritrichous flagella meaning that it has flagella in a uniform distribution all over the cell that it uses for motility. Cells of this species are about 5 μm long and 1.5 μm wide. They may contain endospores that can be located centrally, paracentrally, or subterminally. This bacterium is typically grown on 1% uric acid agar and colonies can have a rhizoid appearance. Colonies are typically opaque and may become yellowish over time. The cells will produce ammonia as a byproduct of their metabolism, which means that their microenvironment will become highly alkaline. This creates a self-limiting cycle that creates zones of inhibition around each colony. Metabacillus fastidiosus is catalase and oxidase positive. It is unable to produce acid or gas when grown in the presence of carbohydrates such as glucose. Metabacillus fastidiosus is able to hydrolyze urea, but it is unable to hydrolyze casein, gelatin, or starch.

== Metabolism ==
Metabacillus fastidious has the ability to use uricase to degrade uric acid to allantoin, and then use allantoinase to degrade allantoin to allantoate. It also has the ability to further break down allantoate to ammonia and ureidoglycolate via the enzyme allantoate amidohydrolase. The liberation of ammonia causes its local environment to rise to a pH between 8 and 9. However, attempts to grow M. fastidious at those higher pH's without urea present were unsuccessful. It is able to metabolize ureidoglycolate further into urea and glyoxylate using the enzyme ureidoglycolase. Metabacillus fastidious is also able to use urease to degrade urea.
