= Fictibacillus nanhaiensis =

Scientific classification
- Domain: Bacteria
- Kingdom: Bacillati
- Phylum: Bacillota
- Class: Bacilli
- Order: Bacillales
- Family: Bacillaceae
- Genus: Fictibacillus
- Species: F. nanhaiensis

Binomial name
- Fictibacillus nanhaiensis (Chen et al. 2011) Glaeser et al. 2013

Type strain
- DSM 23009, JSM 082006, KCTC 13712

Synonyms
- Bacillus nanhaiensis

Species of bacterium

Fictibacillus nanhaiensis is a Gram-positive, aerobic, slightly halophilic, facultatively alkaliphilic, rod-shaped, spore-forming and motile bacterium from the genus Fictibacillus which has been isolated from an oyster from the Naozhou Island in China.
