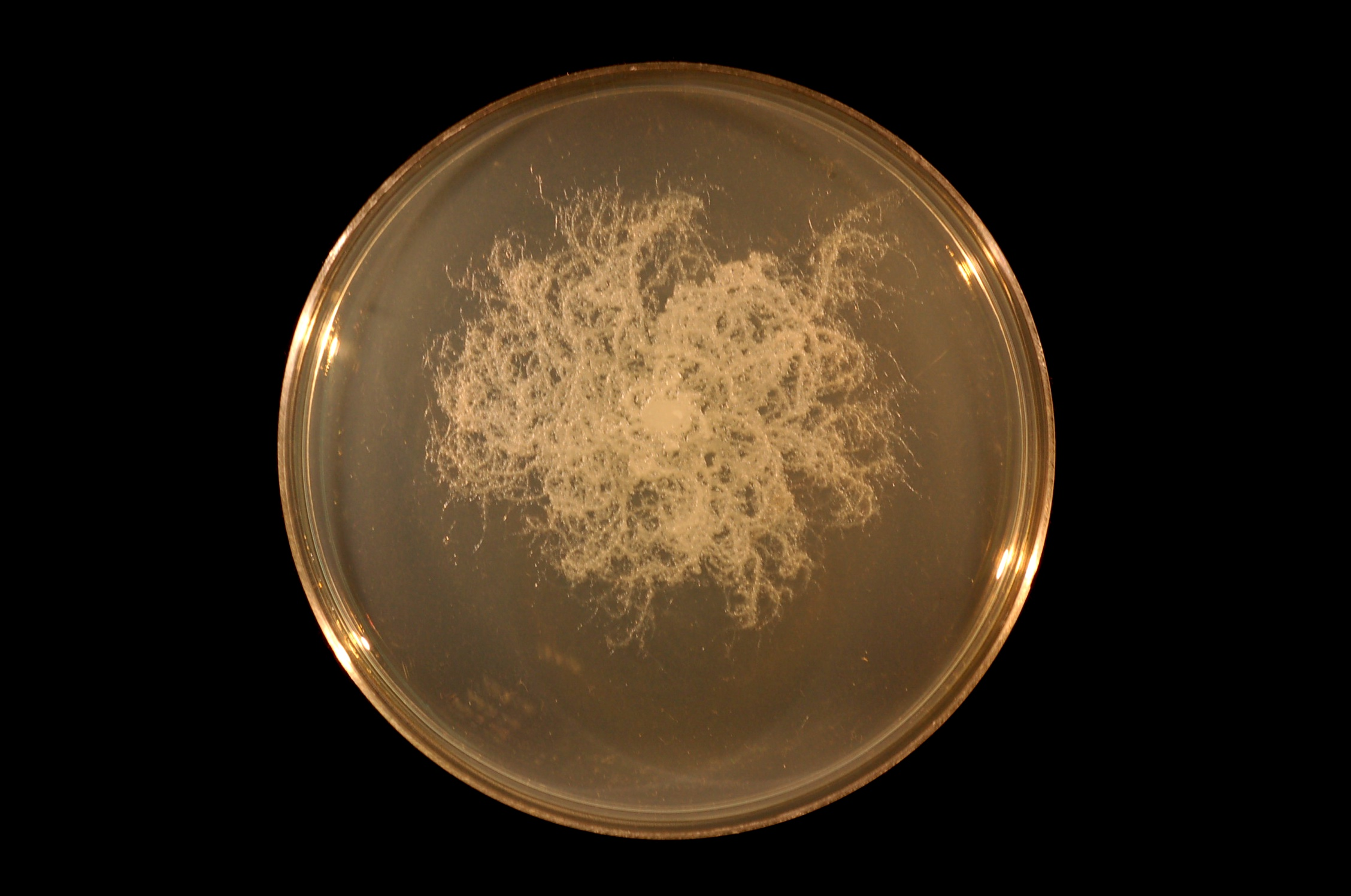
- Bacillus mycoides growing clockwise on an agar plate.

Scientific classification
- Domain: Bacteria
- Kingdom: Bacillati
- Phylum: Bacillota
- Class: Bacilli
- Order: Caryophanales
- Family: Bacillaceae
- Genus: Bacillus
- Species: B. mycoides

Binomial name
- Bacillus mycoides Flügge 1886

Synonyms
- Bacillus weihenstephanensis Lechner et al. 1998; Bacillus hominis Tohya et al. 2021; "Bacillus cereus subsp. mycoides" (Flügge 1886) Smith et al. 1946

= Bacillus mycoides =

Species of bacterium

Bacillus mycoides is a bacterium of the genus Bacillus. Like other Bacillus species, B. mycoides is Gram positive, rod-shaped, and forms spores. B. mycoides is distinguished from other Bacillus species by its unusual growth on agar plates, where it forms expansive hairy colonies with characteristic swirls. B. mycoides is a member of the Bacillus cereus sensu lato group, a closely related species complex that also includes B. anthracis, B. cereus, B. thuringiensis, B. pseudomycoides, B. cytotoxicus, B. toyonensis, and B. wiedmannii.

== Description ==
B. mycoides are rod-shaped cells about 1 micron across and 3 to 5 microns long. When growing, they either grow as single cells or form loosely connected chains of cells. They are not motile. B. mycoides can survive with or without oxygen and grows at temperatures ranging from about 4–7 °C in psychrotolerant strains up to around 40 °C; the species includes both mesophilic strains (no growth at 7 °C, growth at 43 °C) and psychrotolerant strains (growth at 7 °C, no growth at 43 °C). B. mycoides is distinguished from a number of other Bacillus species in the unusual morphology of the colonies it forms when grown on agar plates. B. mycoides forms white opaque colonies that are characteristically hairy in appearance (often referred to as "rhizoid"). These colonies rapidly spread to fill the plate and are characterized by a repeating spiral pattern. B. mycoides has the unusual property of being able to respond to mechanical force and surface structure variations in the media on which it is growing.

=== Colony morphology and chirality ===
When grown on agar, B. mycoides forms rhizoid ("hairy") colonies built from end-to-end chains of cells arranged in radial filaments. A distinctive feature of the species is that its colonies possess a genetically determined handedness: individual strains are either counterclockwise (SIN) or clockwise (DX) morphotypes, a heritable trait established early during filament growth rather than imposed by agar hardness or nutrient concentration. The newly isolated strain Ko01 can switch its direction of rotation depending on agar concentration.

The rhizoid-colony morphotype is shared with Bacillus pseudomycoides, which was split from B. mycoides as a distinct mesophilic species in 1998; the two are morphologically similar but genetically distinct.

The type strain is ATCC 6462 (= DSM 2048), isolated from soil; a complete genome sequence is available.

== Ecology and distribution ==
B. mycoides is present in a wide variety of environments, especially soil. It is distributed worldwide, particularly in soils of continental cold climates, reflecting its psychrotrophic character, and is also recovered from water, plant and animal tissues, and food matrices. Psychrotolerant strains are a recognised cause of spoilage of refrigerated foods, including fluid milk, and some strains carry the genes for the emetic toxin cereulide, a food-safety concern.

== Role in disease ==
B. mycoides are capable of causing disease in some fish, and were the reported cause of an outbreak of necrotic lesions in channel catfish in a commercial pond in Alabama. More recently, B. mycoides has been reported as an emerging pathogen of farmed largemouth bass (Micropterus salmoides) in Guangdong, China, associated with ulcerative skin disease and mortality exceeding 60%; experimental challenge reproduced the lesions.

== B. weihenstephanensis ==
In 1998 a new Bacillis species was described, and named Bacillus weihenstephanensis. However, twenty years later, a comparison of the complete genome sequences of B. weihenstephanensis and B. mycoides demonstrated that the two belong to the same genomospecies. Because B. mycoides has priority of publication, B. weihenstephanensis is a later heterotypic synonym of B. mycoides and is not the correct name, but is treated as a synonym. The name B. weihenstephanensis Lechner et al. 1998 was itself validly published, so it remains a valid but incorrect (synonymous) name rather than an invalid one.

== Biodegradation ==
A strain of B. mycoides has been reported to degrade the explosive TNT (2,4,6-trinitrotoluene) under both aerobic and anaerobic conditions.
