= Fictibacillus solisalsi =

Scientific classification
- Domain: Bacteria
- Kingdom: Bacillati
- Phylum: Bacillota
- Class: Bacilli
- Order: Bacillales
- Family: Bacillaceae
- Genus: Fictibacillus
- Species: F. solisalsi

Binomial name
- Fictibacillus solisalsi (Liu et al. 2009) Glaeser et al. 2013

Type strain
- V11SED5, CGMCC 1.6854, JCM 14863, KCTC 13181, YC1

Synonyms
- Bacillus solisalsi; Bacillus yunchengensis

Species of bacterium

Fictibacillus solisalsi is a Gram-positive, rod-shaped, halotolerant, alkaliphilic and motile bacterium from the genus Fictibacillus which has been isolated from saline soil from Shanxi in China.
