= Fictibacillus arsenicus =

Scientific classification
- Domain: Bacteria
- Kingdom: Bacillati
- Phylum: Bacillota
- Class: Bacilli
- Order: Bacillales
- Family: Bacillaceae
- Genus: Fictibacillus
- Species: F. arsenicus

Binomial name
- Fictibacillus arsenicus (Shivaji et al. 2005) Glaeser et al. 2013

Species of bacterium

Fictibacillus arsenicus, also known as Bacillus arsenicus, is a bacterium. It is Gram-positive, motile, endospore-forming, rod-shaped and arsenic-resistant. Its type strain is Con a/3^{T} (=MTCC 4380^{T}=DSM 15822^{T}=JCM 12167^{T}).
