= Alkalicoccus chagannorensis =

Scientific classification
- Domain: Bacteria
- Kingdom: Bacillati
- Phylum: Bacillota
- Class: Bacilli
- Order: Bacillales
- Family: Bacillaceae
- Genus: Alkalicoccus
- Species: A. chagannorensis

Binomial name
- Alkalicoccus chagannorensis (Carrasco et al. 2007) Gupta et al. 2020

Type strain
- CG-15

Synonyms
- Bacillus chaganniensis Bacillus chagannorensis

Species of bacterium

Alkalicoccus chagannorensis is a Gram-positive, moderately halophilic and spore-forming bacterium from the genus Alkalicoccus which has been isolated from Lake Chagannor, Inner Mongolia.
