= Alkalicoccus daliensis =

Scientific classification
- Domain: Bacteria
- Kingdom: Bacillati
- Phylum: Bacillota
- Class: Bacilli
- Order: Bacillales
- Family: Bacillaceae
- Genus: Alkalicoccus
- Species: A. daliensis

Binomial name
- Alkalicoccus daliensis (Zhai et al. 2012) Gupta et al. 2020

Type strain
- DLS13

Synonyms
- Bacillus daliensis Bacillus dalirensis

Species of bacterium

Alkalicoccus daliensis is a Gram-positive, facultatively anaerobic, alkaliphilic, spore-forming and motile bacterium from the genus Alkalicoccus which has been isolated from the Dali Lake from the Inner Mongolia.
