= Alkalihalobacillus lehensis =

Scientific classification
- Domain: Bacteria
- Kingdom: Bacillati
- Phylum: Bacillota
- Class: Bacilli
- Order: Bacillales
- Family: Bacillaceae
- Genus: Alkalihalobacillus
- Species: A. lehensis

Binomial name
- Alkalihalobacillus lehensis (Ghosh et al. 2007) Patel and Gupta 2020

Type strain
- MLB2

Synonyms
- Bacillus lehensis

Species of bacterium

Alkalihalobacillus lehensis is a Gram-positive, endospore-forming and alkalitolerant bacterium from the genus of Alkalihalobacillus which has been isolated from soil from Leh.
