= Alkalicoccus luteus =

Scientific classification
- Domain: Bacteria
- Kingdom: Bacillati
- Phylum: Bacillota
- Class: Bacilli
- Order: Bacillales
- Family: Bacillaceae
- Genus: Alkalicoccus
- Species: A. luteus

Binomial name
- Alkalicoccus luteus (Subhash et al. 2014) Gupta et al. 2020

Type strain
- JC167

Synonyms
- Bacillus luteus

Species of bacterium

Alkalicoccus luteus is a Gram-positive bacterium from the genus Alkalicoccus.
