= Alkalicoccus saliphilus =

Scientific classification
- Domain: Bacteria
- Kingdom: Bacillati
- Phylum: Bacillota
- Class: Bacilli
- Order: Bacillales
- Family: Bacillaceae
- Genus: Alkalicoccus
- Species: A. saliphilus

Binomial name
- Alkalicoccus saliphilus (Romano et al. 2005) Zhao et al. 2017

Type strain
- 6AG

Synonyms
- Bacillus saliphilus

Species of bacterium

Alkalicoccus saliphilus is a Gram-positive and haloalkaliphilic bacterium from the genus Alkalicoccus. It was first isolated from the algal mat of a mineral pool in the Malvizza mud volcanoes of Campania and can tolerate concentrations of up to 25% sodium chloride.
