= Salibacterium qingdaonense =

Salibacterium halotolerans

Scientific classification
- Domain: Bacteria
- Kingdom: Bacillati
- Phylum: Bacillota
- Class: Bacilli
- Order: Bacillales
- Family: Bacillaceae
- Genus: Salibacterium
- Species: S. halotolerans

Binomial name
- Salibacterium halotolerans (Wang et al. 2007) Reddy et al. 2015

Type strain
- CM1, CGMCC 1.6134, JCM 14087

Synonyms
- Bacillus qingdaonensis

Species of bacterium

Salibacterium qingdaonense is a Gram-positive and haloalkaliphilic bacterium from the genus of Salibacterium which has been isolated from crude sea salt near Qingdao in China.
