= Alkalihalobacillus shacheensis =

Scientific classification
- Domain: Bacteria
- Kingdom: Bacillati
- Phylum: Bacillota
- Class: Bacilli
- Order: Bacillales
- Family: Bacillaceae
- Genus: Alkalihalobacillus
- Species: A. shacheensis

Binomial name
- Alkalihalobacillus shacheensis (Lei et al. 2014) Patel and Gupta 2020

Type strain
- HNA-14

Synonyms
- Bacillus shacheensis

Species of bacterium

Alkalihalobacillus shacheensis is a moderately halophilic bacterium from the genus of Alkalihalobacillus which has been isolated from saline-alkali soil from Shache County.
