= Fictibacillus barbaricus =

Scientific classification
- Domain: Bacteria
- Kingdom: Bacillati
- Phylum: Bacillota
- Class: Bacilli
- Order: Bacillales
- Family: Bacillaceae
- Genus: Fictibacillus
- Species: F. barbaricus

Binomial name
- Fictibacillus barbaricus (Täubel et al. 2003) Glaeser et al. 2013

Type strain
- CCM 4982, CIP 108015, DSM 14730, KCTC 3853, LMG 23067, V2-BIII-A2

Synonyms
- Bacillus barbaricus

Species of bacterium

Fictibacillus barbaricus is a bacterium from the genus Fictibacillus which has been isolated from a wall painting in Austria.
