= Alteribacillus persepolensis =

Scientific classification
- Domain: Bacteria
- Kingdom: Bacillati
- Phylum: Bacillota
- Class: Bacilli
- Order: Bacillales
- Family: Marinococcaceae
- Genus: Alteribacillus
- Species: A. persepolensis

Binomial name
- Alteribacillus persepolensis (Amoozegar et al. 2009) Didari et al. 2012

Type strain
- CCM 7595, DSM 21632, HS136, JCM 15720, LMG 24785, LMG 25222

Synonyms
- Bacillus persepolensis

Species of bacterium

Alteribacillus persepolensis is a Gram-positive and moderately halophilic bacterium in the genus of Alteribacillus, isolated from the brine of the Howz Soltan Lake in Iran.
