= Alkalihalobacillus plakortidis =

Scientific classification
- Domain: Bacteria
- Kingdom: Bacillati
- Phylum: Bacillota
- Class: Bacilli
- Order: Bacillales
- Family: Bacillaceae
- Genus: Alkalihalobacillus
- Species: A. plakortidis

Binomial name
- Alkalihalobacillus plakortidis (Borchert et al. 2007) Patel and Gupta 2020

Type strain
- P203

Synonyms
- Bacillus plakortidis Bacillus plakortiensis

Species of bacterium

Alkalihalobacillus plakortidis is a bacterium from the genus of Alkalihalobacillus.
