= Fictibacillus rigui =

Scientific classification
- Domain: Bacteria
- Kingdom: Bacillati
- Phylum: Bacillota
- Class: Bacilli
- Order: Bacillales
- Family: Bacillaceae
- Genus: Fictibacillus
- Species: F. rigui

Binomial name
- Fictibacillus rigui (Baik et al. 2010) Glaeser et al. 2013

Type strain
- WPCB074, WPCB165, JCM 16348, KCTC 13278

Synonyms
- Bacillus rigui

Species of bacterium

Fictibacillus rigui is a Gram-positive, aerobic, spore-forming and motile bacterium from the genus Fictibacillus which has been isolated from fresh water from the Woopo wetland in Korea.
