= Bacillus pseudomycoides =

Scientific classification
- Domain: Bacteria
- Kingdom: Bacillati
- Phylum: Bacillota
- Class: Bacilli
- Order: Caryophanales
- Family: Bacillaceae
- Genus: Bacillus
- Species: B. pseudomycoides

Binomial name
- Bacillus pseudomycoides Nakamura 1998

Species of bacterium

Bacillus pseudomycoides is a bacterium. The type strain is NRRL B-617^{T}.
