= Anaerobacillus alkalidiazotrophicus =

Scientific classification
- Domain: Bacteria
- Kingdom: Bacillati
- Phylum: Bacillota
- Class: Bacilli
- Order: Bacillales
- Family: Bacillaceae
- Genus: Anaerobacillus
- Species: A. alkalidiazotrophicus

Binomial name
- Anaerobacillus alkalidiazotrophicus (Sorokin et al. 2008) Zavarzina et al. 2010

Type strain
- ATCC 700614, DSM 15340, E1H, KCTC 5192

Synonyms
- Bacillus alkalidiazotrophicus

Species of bacterium

Anaerobacillus alkalidiazotrophicus is a strictly anaerobic, diazotrophic and spore-forming bacterium from the genus of Anaerobacillus which has been isolated from soil from Choibalsan in Mongolia.
