= Fictibacillus gelatini =

Scientific classification
- Domain: Bacteria
- Kingdom: Bacillati
- Phylum: Bacillota
- Class: Bacilli
- Order: Bacillales
- Family: Bacillaceae
- Genus: Fictibacillus
- Species: F. gelatini

Binomial name
- Fictibacillus gelatini (De Clerck et al. 2004) Glaeser et al. 2013

Type strain
- R-13853, DSM 15865, LMG 21880

Synonyms
- Bacillus gelatini

Species of bacterium

Fictibacillus gelatini is a bacterium from the genus Fictibacillus which has been isolated from contaminated gelatin in Belgium.
