= Salibacterium halochares =

Scientific classification
- Domain: Bacteria
- Kingdom: Bacillati
- Phylum: Bacillota
- Class: Bacilli
- Order: Bacillales
- Family: Bacillaceae
- Genus: Salibacterium
- Species: S. halochares

Binomial name
- Salibacterium halochares (Pappa et al. 2010) Vishnuvardhan et al. 2015

Type strain
- DSM 21373, LMG 24571, MSS4

Synonyms
- Bacillus halochares

Species of bacterium

Salibacterium halochares is a Gram-positive, aerobic and halophilic bacterium from the genus of Salibacterium which has been isolated from a saltern from Mesolongi in Greece.
