= Halalkalibacterium halodurans =

Scientific classification
- Domain: Bacteria
- Kingdom: Bacillati
- Phylum: Bacillota
- Class: Bacilli
- Order: Bacillales
- Family: Bacillaceae
- Genus: Halalkalibacterium
- Species: H. halodurans

Binomial name
- Halalkalibacterium halodurans (Nielsen et al. 1995 ex Boyer et al. 1973) Joshi et al. 2022

Synonyms
- Alkalihalobacillus halodurans (Nielsen et al. 1995 ex Boyer et al. 1973) Patel and Gupta 2020; Bacillus halodurans (ex Boyer et al. 1973) Nielsen et al. 1995

Species of bacterium

Bacillus halodurans is a rod-shaped, Gram-positive, motile and spore-forming bacterium found in soil. In a genomic comparison with Bacillus subtilis, B. halodurans strain C-125 - originally an unclassified Bacillus strain - was found to contain unique genes and sigma factors that may have aided its adaptation to more alkaline environments.

This species has been recently transferred into the genus Alkalihalobacillus. The correct nomenclature is Alkalihalobacillus halodurans.

== Bacteriocin production ==
B. halodurans produces a bacteriocin, haloduracin, that may be useful as a lantibiotic and could be produced in large quantities by solid state fermentation.

== Genome structure ==
B. halodurans has a genome that contains 4.2 Mbp with 4,066 protein coding genes.
