= Psychrobacillus psychrodurans =

Scientific classification
- Domain: Bacteria
- Kingdom: Bacillati
- Phylum: Bacillota
- Class: Bacilli
- Order: Bacillales
- Family: Bacillaceae
- Genus: Psychrobacillus
- Species: P. psychrodurans

Binomial name
- Psychrobacillus psychrodurans (Larkin and Stokes 1967) Krishnamurthi et al. 2011

Type strain
- 68E3, ATCC BAA-796, ATCCBAA-796, CCM 7306, CIP 107791, DSM 11713, KCTC 3793, LMG 23063, NCIMB 13837

Synonyms
- Bacillus psychrodurans

Species of bacterium

Psychrobacillus psychrodurans is a psychrotolerant bacterium from the genus of Psychrobacillus which has been isolated from garden soil from Egypt.
