= Alteribacillus iranensis =

Scientific classification
- Domain: Bacteria
- Kingdom: Bacillati
- Phylum: Bacillota
- Class: Bacilli
- Order: Bacillales
- Family: Marinococcaceae
- Genus: Alteribacillus
- Species: A. iranensis

Binomial name
- Alteribacillus iranensis Azmatunnisa Begum et al. 2016

Type strain
- DSM 23995, IBRC 10446, strain X5B

Synonyms
- Bacillus iranensis

Species of bacterium

Alteribacillus iranensis is a Gram-positive and moderately halophilic bacterium from the genus of Alteribacillus which has been isolated from mud from the Aran-Bidgol Lake in Iran.
