= Paenibacillus alvei =

Scientific classification
- Domain: Bacteria
- Kingdom: Bacillati
- Phylum: Bacillota
- Class: Bacilli
- Order: Paenibacillales
- Family: Paenibacillaceae
- Genus: Paenibacillus
- Species: P. alvei

Binomial name
- Paenibacillus alvei (Cheshire and Cheyne 1885) Ash et al. 1994

Species of bacterium

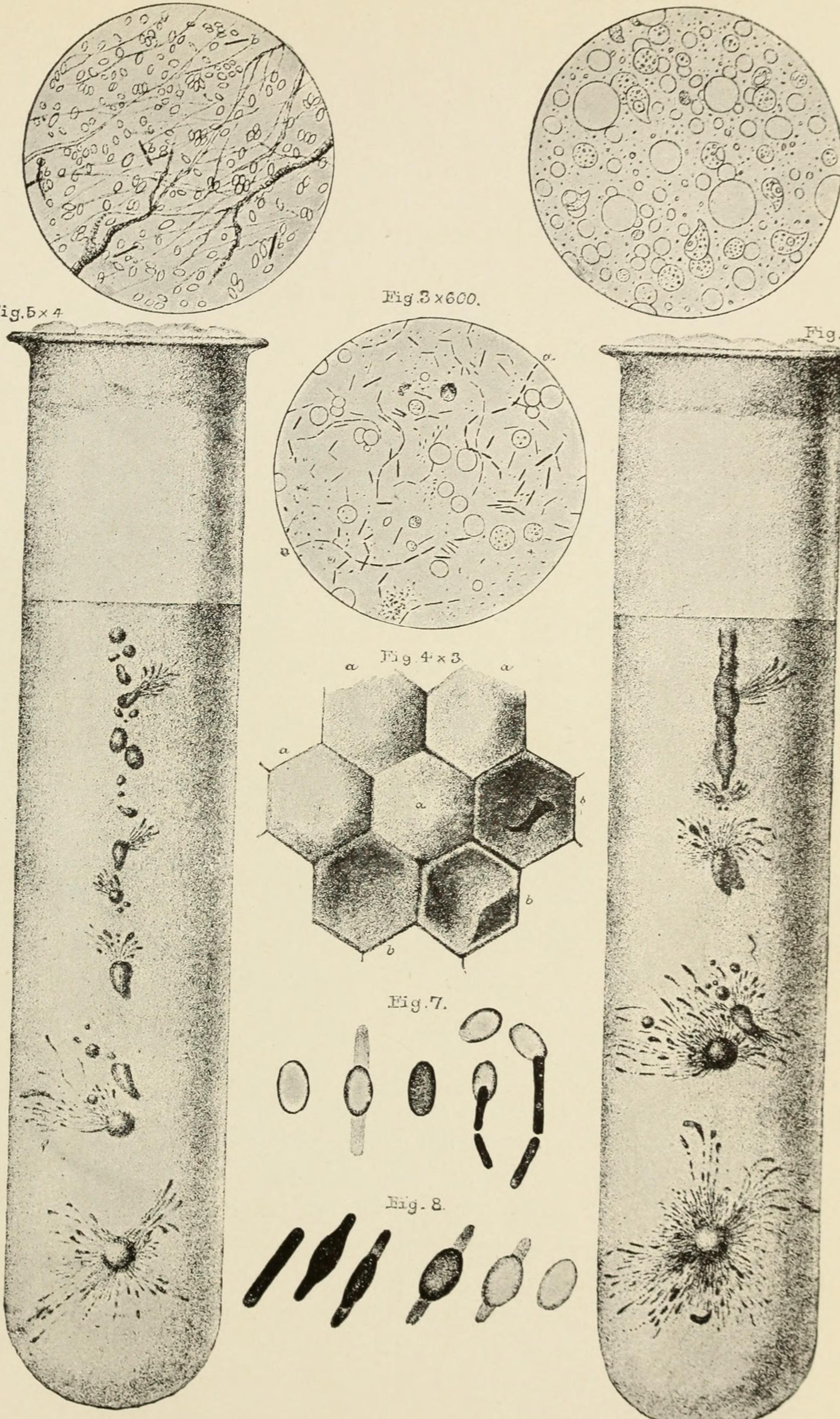
Drawings that illustrate foulbrood, from The honey bee - a manual of instruction in apiculture (1899).

Paenibacillus alvei (formerly Bacillus alvei) is a species of bacteria within the order Bacillales. Like other species within the genus Paenibacillus, strains of this species grow in novel, vortex-like, or branched patterns. This species is associated with the honey bee disease European foulbrood.
