= Psychrobacillus insolitus =

Scientific classification
- Domain: Bacteria
- Kingdom: Bacillati
- Phylum: Bacillota
- Class: Bacilli
- Order: Bacillales
- Family: Bacillaceae
- Genus: Psychrobacillus
- Species: P. insolitus

Binomial name
- Psychrobacillus insolitus (Larkin and Stokes 1967) Krishnamurthi et al. 2011

Type strain
- ATCC 23299, BCRC 11737, CCM 2175, CCRC 11737, CCT 2470, CCUG 7420, CFBP 2978, CGMCC 1.3683, CIP 103268, DSM 5, HAMBI 477, KCTC 3737, KCTC 3854, LMG 17757, LMG 7126, Logan B0432, Logan B0540, NCIB 11433, NCIMB 11433, NRRL B-3395, NRS-1531, E-011789, W16b, W16B

Synonyms
- Bacillus insolitus

Species of bacterium

Psychrobacillus insolitus is a bacterium from the genus of Psychrobacillus which has been isolated from soil. Psychrobacillus insolitus can spoil food.
