= Niallia circulans =

Scientific classification
- Missing taxonomy template (fix): Niallia
- Species: Template:Taxonomy/NialliaN. circulans

Binomial name
- Template:Taxonomy/NialliaNiallia circulans (Jordan 1890) Gupta et al. 2020

Synonyms
- Bacillus circulans Jordan, 1890 (Approved Lists 1980)

Species of bacterium

Niallia circulans is a soil-dwelling human pathogen which has been associated with "septicemia, mixed abscess infections, and wound infections", as well as with meningitis.

This species has been recently transferred into the genus Niallia. The correct nomenclature is Niallia circulans.

== Morphology ==
=== Staining ===
Gram-positive, Gram-variable or Gram-negative. Positive spore stain result.

=== Shape and size ===
==== Vegetative cell ====
Straight, occasionally curved rods, 2.0-4.2 x 0.5-0.8 μm, motile by peritrichous flagella.

==== Spores ====
Has ellipsoidal spores which are subterminal or terminal; swelling the sporangia. These are "centrally located" and either cylindrical or "Kidney-shaped".
