= -monas =

Suffix in microbiology

The suffix -monas is used in microbiology for many genera and is intended to mean "unicellular organism".

== Meaning ==
The suffix -monas found in many genera in microbiology is similar in usage to -bacter, -bacillus, -coccus or -spirillum. The genera with the suffix are not a monophyletic group and the suffix is chosen over -bacter, often simply out of stylistic preferences to match with Greek words.

The first genus to be given the suffix -monas was Pseudomonas, a genus of gammaproteobacteria. The generic epithet Pseudomonas was coined by Walter Migula in 1894, who did not give an etymology. Since the 7th edition of Bergey's manual (=top authority in bacterial nomenclature), other authors have given the etymology to be: Greek pseudēs (ψευδής, false) and monas (μονάς, single unit or monad), which can mean "false unit". However, "false unit" conceptually does not make much sense, namely, it does not mean "an organism which may falsely appear as a single unit but it is not" as it is not found in multicellular chains nor was it ever described as such. One speculation is that the name was chosen simply out of aesthetics, while the most plausible theory states that Migula intended it as false Monas, a nanoflagellate protist (Chrysophyceae: Ochromonadales: Ochromonadaceae: Chrysomonadida: Ochromonadidae). Subsequently, the term "monas" was used in the early history of microbiology to denote single-celled organisms.

== Grammar ==
In English to make a vernacular name for members of a genus, i.e. trivialising the scientific name, the scientific name is taken and written with sentence case and in roman type (i.e. "standard") as opposed to uppercase italic, the plurals are generally constructed by adding an "s", regardless of Greco-Roman grammar. In the case of genera ending in monas the ending is changed to monad with plural -monads. Example: a member of the genus Pseudomonas is a pseudomonad, while two are pseudomonads. The use of the stem for non-nominative cases is seen more often in botany, where trivialisation is more common, e.g. a bromeliad is a member of the genus Bromelia.

== Archaeal genera ==
Genus	Phylum	Class	Order	Family
Natronomonas	Euryarchaeota	Halobacteria	Halobacteriales	Halobacteriaceae
Thermogymnomonas	Euryarchaeota	Thermoplasmata	Thermoplasmatales	

== Bacterial genera ==
Genus	Phylum	Class	Order	Family
Acidomonas	Pseudomonadota	Alphaproteobacteria	Rhodospirillales	Acetobacteraceae
Aeromonas	Pseudomonadota	Gammaproteobacteria	Aeromonadales	Aeromonadaceae
Agromonas	Pseudomonadota	Alphaproteobacteria	Hyphomicrobiales	Nitrobacteraceae
Aidingimonas	Pseudomonadota	Gammaproteobacteria	Oceanospirillales	Halomonadaceae
Albimonas	Pseudomonadota	Alphaproteobacteria	Rhodobacterales	Rhodobacteraceae
Alkalimonas	Pseudomonadota	Gammaproteobacteria		
Allomonas	Pseudomonadota	Gammaproteobacteria	Vibrionales	Vibrionaceae
Alteromonas	Pseudomonadota	Gammaproteobacteria	Alteromonadales	Alteromonadaceae
Aminomonas	Synergistota	Synergistia	Synergistales	Synergistaceae
Aquimonas	Pseudomonadota	Gammaproteobacteria	Xanthomonadales	Xanthomonadaceae
Aquisalimonas	Pseudomonadota	Gammaproteobacteria	Chromatiales	Ectothiorhodospiraceae
Arenimonas	Pseudomonadota	Gammaproteobacteria	Xanthomonadales	Xanthomonadaceae
Arhodomonas	Pseudomonadota	Gammaproteobacteria	Chromatiales	Ectothiorhodospiraceae
Aspromonas	Pseudomonadota	Gammaproteobacteria	Xanthomonadales	Xanthomonadaceae
Aurantimonas	Pseudomonadota	Alphaproteobacteria	Hyphomicrobiales	Aurantimonadaceae
Azohydromonas	Pseudomonadota	Betaproteobacteria	Burkholderiales	Alcaligenaceae
Azomonas	Pseudomonadota	Gammaproteobacteria	Pseudomonadales	Pseudomonadaceae
Balneimonas	Pseudomonadota	Alphaproteobacteria	Hyphomicrobiales	Nitrobacteraceae
Blastomonas	Pseudomonadota	Alphaproteobacteria	Sphingomonadales	Sphingomonadaceae
Brachymonas	Pseudomonadota	Betaproteobacteria	Burkholderiales	Comamonadaceae
Brevundimonas	Pseudomonadota	Alphaproteobacteria	Caulobacterales	Caulobacteraceae
Butyricimonas	Bacteroidota	Bacteroidia	Bacteroidales	Porphyromonadaceae
Caenimonas	Pseudomonadota	Betaproteobacteria	Burkholderiales	Comamonadaceae
Caldimonas	Pseudomonadota	Betaproteobacteria	Burkholderiales	Comamonadaceae
Camelimonas	Pseudomonadota	Alphaproteobacteria	Hyphomicrobiales	Beijerinckiaceae
Carnimonas	Pseudomonadota	Gammaproteobacteria	Oceanospirillales	Halomonadaceae
Celerinatantimonas	Pseudomonadota	Gammaproteobacteria	Alteromonadales	Celerinatantimonadaceae
Cellulomonas	Actinomycetota	Actinomycetia	Actinomycetales	Cellulomonadaceae
Chitinimonas	Pseudomonadota	Betaproteobacteria	Burkholderiales	Burkholderiaceae
Chryseomonas	Pseudomonadota	Gammaproteobacteria	Pseudomonadales	Pseudomonadaceae
Citreimonas	Pseudomonadota	Alphaproteobacteria	Rhodobacterales	Rhodobacteraceae
Cocleimonas	Pseudomonadota	Gammaproteobacteria		
Collimonas	Pseudomonadota	Betaproteobacteria	Burkholderiales	Oxalobacteraceae
Comamonas	Pseudomonadota	Betaproteobacteria	Burkholderiales	Comamonadaceae
Conglomeromonas	Pseudomonadota	Alphaproteobacteria	Rhodospirillales	Rhodospirillaceae
Dechloromonas	Pseudomonadota	Betaproteobacteria	Rhodocyclales	Rhodocyclaceae
Dehalogenimonas	Chloroflexota	Dehalococcoidetes		
Desulfomonas	Thermodesulfobacteriota	Desulfovibrionia	Desulfovibrionales	Desulfovibrionaceae
Desulfosalsimonas	Thermodesulfobacteriota	Desulfovibrionia	Desulfobacterales	Desulfobacteraceae
Desulfuromonas	Thermodesulfobacteriota	Desulfuromonadia	Desulfuromonadales	Desulfuromonadaceae
Dysgonomonas	Bacteroidota	Bacteroidia	Bacteroidales	Porphyromonadaceae
Endozoicomonas	Pseudomonadota	Gammaproteobacteria	Oceanospirillales	Hahellaceae
Epilithonimonas	Bacteroidota	Flavobacteria	Flavobacteriales	Flavobacteriaceae
Erythromonas	Pseudomonadota	Alphaproteobacteria	Sphingomonadales	Sphingomonadaceae
Ferrimonas	Pseudomonadota	Gammaproteobacteria	Alteromonadales	Ferrimonadaceae
Filimonas	Bacteroidota	Sphingobacteria	Sphingobacteriales	Chitinophagaceae
Flagellimonas	Bacteroidota	Flavobacteria	Flavobacteriales	Flavobacteriaceae
Flavimonas	Pseudomonadota	Gammaproteobacteria	Pseudomonadales	Pseudomonadaceae
Fulvimonas	Pseudomonadota	Gammaproteobacteria	Xanthomonadales	Xanthomonadaceae
Gallaecimonas	Pseudomonadota	Gammaproteobacteria		
Gemmatimonas	Gemmatimonadota	Gemmatimonadetes	Gemmatimonadales	Gemmatimonadaceae
Gracilimonas	Bacteroidota	Sphingobacteria	Sphingobacteriales	Chitinophagaceae
Halomonas	Pseudomonadota	Gammaproteobacteria	Oceanospirillales	Halomonadaceae
Herminiimonas	Pseudomonadota	Betaproteobacteria	Burkholderiales	Oxalobacteraceae
Hydrogenimonas	Campylobacterota	Campylobacteria	Campylobacterales	Hydrogenimonaceae
Hyphomonas	Pseudomonadota	Alphaproteobacteria	Caulobacterales	Hyphomonadaceae
Kistimonas	Pseudomonadota	Gammaproteobacteria	Oceanospirillales	Hahellaceae
Kordiimonas	Pseudomonadota	Alphaproteobacteria	Kordiimonadales	Kordiimonadaceae
Lebetimonas	Campylobacterota	Nautiliia	Nautiliales	Nautiliaceae
Luteimonas	Pseudomonadota	Gammaproteobacteria	Xanthomonadales	Xanthomonadaceae
Lutimonas	Bacteroidota	Flavobacteria	Flavobacteriales	Flavobacteriaceae
Macromonas	Pseudomonadota	Betaproteobacteria	Burkholderiales	Comamonadaceae
Malonomonas	Thermodesulfobacteriota	Desulfuromonadia	Desulfuromonadales	Desulfuromonadaceae
Marinomonas	Pseudomonadota	Gammaproteobacteria	Oceanospirillales	Oceanospirillaceae
Maritimimonas	Bacteroidota	Flavobacteria	Flavobacteriales	Flavobacteriaceae
Marixanthomonas	Bacteroidota	Flavobacteria	Flavobacteriales	Flavobacteriaceae
Megamonas	Bacillota	Negativicutes	Selenomonadales	Veillonellaceae
Methylohalomonas	Pseudomonadota	Gammaproteobacteria		
Methylomonas	Pseudomonadota	Gammaproteobacteria	Methylococcales	Methylococcaceae
Miniimonas	Actinomycetota	Actinomycetia	Actinomycetales	Beutenbergiaceae
Neptunomonas	Pseudomonadota	Gammaproteobacteria	Oceanospirillales	Oceanospirillaceae
Nitrosomonas	Pseudomonadota	Betaproteobacteria	Nitrosomonadales	Nitrosomonadaceae
Oceanimonas	Pseudomonadota	Gammaproteobacteria	Aeromonadales	Aeromonadaceae
Paraferrimonas	Pseudomonadota	Gammaproteobacteria	Alteromonadales	Ferrimonadaceae
Parapusillimonas	Pseudomonadota	Betaproteobacteria	Burkholderiales	Alcaligenaceae
Parvimonas	Bacillota	Clostridia	Clostridiales	
Paucimonas	Pseudomonadota	Betaproteobacteria	Burkholderiales	Burkholderiaceae
Pelomonas	Pseudomonadota	Betaproteobacteria	Burkholderiales	Comamonadaceae
Petrimonas	Bacteroidota	Bacteroidia	Bacteroidales	Porphyromonadaceae
Pleomorphomonas	Pseudomonadota	Alphaproteobacteria	Hyphomicrobiales	Methylocystaceae
Plesiomonas	Pseudomonadota	Gammaproteobacteria	Enterobacteriales	Enterobacteriaceae
Polaromonas	Pseudomonadota	Betaproteobacteria	Burkholderiales	Comamonadaceae
Porphyromonas	Bacteroidota	Bacteroidia	Bacteroidales	Porphyromonadaceae
Propionicimonas	Actinomycetota	Actinomycetia	Actinomycetales	Propionibacteriaceae
Protomonas	Pseudomonadota	Alphaproteobacteria	Hyphomicrobiales	Methylobacteriaceae
Pseudoalteromonas	Pseudomonadota	Gammaproteobacteria	Alteromonadales	Pseudoalteromonadaceae
Pseudofulvimonas	Pseudomonadota	Gammaproteobacteria	Xanthomonadales	Xanthomonadaceae
Pseudomonas	Pseudomonadota	Gammaproteobacteria	Pseudomonadales	Pseudomonadaceae
Pseudoxanthomonas	Pseudomonadota	Gammaproteobacteria	Xanthomonadales	Xanthomonadaceae
Psychromonas	Pseudomonadota	Gammaproteobacteria	Alteromonadales	Psychromonadaceae
Pusillimonas	Pseudomonadota	Betaproteobacteria	Burkholderiales	Alcaligenaceae
Rhizomonas	Pseudomonadota	Alphaproteobacteria	Sphingomonadales	Sphingomonadaceae
Rhodopseudomonas	Pseudomonadota	Alphaproteobacteria	Hyphomicrobiales	Nitrobacteraceae
Roseomonas	Pseudomonadota	Alphaproteobacteria	Rhodospirillales	Acetobacteraceae
Rubrimonas	Pseudomonadota	Alphaproteobacteria	Rhodobacterales	Rhodobacteraceae
Rugamonas	Pseudomonadota	Gammaproteobacteria	Pseudomonadales	Pseudomonadaceae
Salinarimonas	Pseudomonadota	Alphaproteobacteria	Hyphomicrobiales	Nitrobacteraceae
Salinimonas	Pseudomonadota	Gammaproteobacteria	Alteromonadales	Alteromonadaceae
Sediminimonas	Pseudomonadota	Alphaproteobacteria	Rhodobacterales	Rhodobacteraceae
Selenomonas	Bacillota	Negativicutes	Selenomonadales	Veillonellaceae
Silanimonas	Pseudomonadota	Gammaproteobacteria	Xanthomonadales	Xanthomonadaceae
Silvimonas	Pseudomonadota	Betaproteobacteria	Neisseriales	Neisseriaceae
Singularimonas	Pseudomonadota	Gammaproteobacteria	Xanthomonadales	Sinobacteraceae
Sinomonas	Actinomycetota	Actinomycetia	Actinomycetales	Micrococcaceae
Solimonas	Pseudomonadota	Gammaproteobacteria		
Sphingomonas	Pseudomonadota	Alphaproteobacteria	Sphingomonadales	Sphingomonadaceae
Stenotrophomonas	Pseudomonadota	Gammaproteobacteria	Xanthomonadales	Xanthomonadaceae
Succinatimonas	Pseudomonadota	Gammaproteobacteria	Aeromonadales	Succinivibrionaceae
Succinimonas	Pseudomonadota	Gammaproteobacteria	Aeromonadales	Succinivibrionaceae
Sulfurimonas	Campylobacterota	Campylobacteria	Campylobacterales	Helicobacteraceae
Syntrophomonas	Bacillota	Clostridia	Clostridiales	Syntrophomonadaceae
Tepidimonas	Pseudomonadota	Betaproteobacteria	Burkholderiales	
Terrimonas	Bacteroidota	Sphingobacteria	Sphingobacteriales	Chitinophagaceae
Thalassomonas	Pseudomonadota	Gammaproteobacteria	Alteromonadales	Colwelliaceae
Thermanaeromonas	Bacillota	Clostridia	Thermoanaerobacterales	Thermoanaerobacteraceae
Thermomonas	Pseudomonadota	Gammaproteobacteria	Xanthomonadales	Xanthomonadaceae
Thiohalomonas	Pseudomonadota	Gammaproteobacteria		
Thiomonas	Pseudomonadota	Betaproteobacteria	Burkholderiales	
Tolumonas	Pseudomonadota	Gammaproteobacteria	Aeromonadales	Aeromonadaceae
Tranquillimonas	Pseudomonadota	Alphaproteobacteria	Rhodobacterales	Rhodobacteraceae
Tropicimonas	Pseudomonadota	Alphaproteobacteria	Rhodobacterales	Rhodobacteraceae
Wohlfahrtiimonas	Pseudomonadota	Gammaproteobacteria	Xanthomonadales	Xanthomonadaceae
Xanthomonas	Pseudomonadota	Gammaproteobacteria	Xanthomonadales	Xanthomonadaceae
Xylanimonas	Actinomycetota	Actinomycetia	Actinomycetales	Promicromonosporaceae
Zymomonas	Pseudomonadota	Alphaproteobacteria	Sphingomonadales	Sphingomonadaceae

== See also ==
- -bacter
