= Thioalkalivibrio thiocyanoxidans =

Scientific classification
- Domain: Bacteria
- Kingdom: Pseudomonadati
- Phylum: Pseudomonadota
- Class: Gammaproteobacteria
- Order: Chromatiales
- Family: Ectothiorhodospiraceae
- Genus: Thioalkalivibrio
- Species: T. thiocyanoxidans

Binomial name
- Thioalkalivibrio thiocyanoxidans Sorokin et al. 2002

Species of bacterium

Thioalkalivibrio thiocyanoxidans is a species of alkaliphilic and obligately autotrophic sulfur-oxidizing bacterium. It was first isolated from soda lakes. Its type strain is Arh 2 (= DSM 13532 = JCM 11368).
