= Thioalkalivibrio nitratis =

Scientific classification
- Domain: Bacteria
- Kingdom: Pseudomonadati
- Phylum: Pseudomonadota
- Class: Gammaproteobacteria
- Order: Chromatiales
- Family: Ectothiorhodospiraceae
- Genus: Thioalkalivibrio
- Species: T. nitratis

Binomial name
- Thioalkalivibrio nitratis Sorokin et al. 2001

Species of bacterium

Thioalkalivibrio nitratis is an obligately alkaliphilic and obligately chemolithoautotrophic sulfur-oxidizing bacteria. It was first isolated from soda lakes in northern Russia.
