= Thiorhodospira sibirica =

Scientific classification
- Domain: Bacteria
- Kingdom: Pseudomonadati
- Phylum: Pseudomonadota
- Class: Gammaproteobacteria
- Order: Chromatiales
- Family: Ectothiorhodospiraceae
- Genus: Thiorhodospira
- Species: T. sibirica

Binomial name
- Thiorhodospira sibirica Bryantseva et al. 1999

Species of bacterium

Thiorhodospira sibirica is a species of alkaliphilic purple sulfur bacterium. It is strictly anaerobic, vibrioid- or spiral-shaped (3-4μm wide and 7-20 μm long) and motile by means of a polar tuft of flagella.
