= Alkalihalobacillus marmarensis =

Scientific classification
- Domain: Bacteria
- Kingdom: Bacillati
- Phylum: Bacillota
- Class: Bacilli
- Order: Bacillales
- Family: Bacillaceae
- Genus: Alkalihalobacillus
- Species: A. marmarensis

Binomial name
- Alkalihalobacillus marmarensis (Denizci et al. 2010) Patel and Gupta 2020

Type strain
- GMBE 72

Synonyms
- Bacillus marmarensis

Species of bacterium

Alkalihalobacillus marmarensis is a Gram-positive, aerobic and obligately alkaliphilic bacterium from the genus Alkalihalobacillus which has been isolated from isolated from mushroom compost from Yalova.
