= Alkalihalobacillus =

Scientific classification
- Domain: Bacteria
- Kingdom: Bacillati
- Phylum: Bacillota
- Class: Bacilli
- Order: Caryophanales
- Family: Bacillaceae
- Genus: Alkalihalobacillus; Patel and Gupta 2020

Type species
- Alkalihalobacillus alcalophilus (Vedder 1934) Patel & Gupta 2020

Species
- See text

Genus of gram-positive or gram-variable rod-shaped bacteria

Alkalihalobacillus is a genus of gram-positive or gram-variable rod-shaped bacteria in the family Bacillaceae from the order Bacillales. The type species of this genus is Alkalihalobacillus alcalophilus.

This genus comprises species formerly belonging to the genus Bacillus, a genus that has been recognized as displaying extensive polyphyly and phylogenetic heterogeneity due to the vague criteria (such as the ability to form endospores in the presence of oxygen) previously used to assign species to this clade. Multiple studies using comparative phylogenetic analyses have been published in an attempt to clarify the evolutionary relationships between Bacillus species, resulting in the establishment of numerous novel genera such as Alkalihalobacillus, Brevibacillus, Solibacillus, Alicyclobacillus and Virgibacillus. The genus Bacillus is now restricted to species closely related to Bacillus subtilis and Bacillus cereus.

The name Alkalihalobacillus is composed of the prefix "alkali-" (from the Arabic article and noun al galiy, which translates to 'the ashes of saltwort'), the prefix "halo-" (from the Greek noun hals/halos, meaning salt) and suffixed by "-bacillus" (from the Latin noun bacillus, referring to 'a small staff or rod' and Bacillus, a bacterial genus). Together, the name refers to bacillus living in salty or alkaline conditions, or salty and alkaline conditions.

== Classification ==
=== Phylogeny ===
This genus, as of May 2021, contains a total of 44 species, 39 of which have been validly published and have established names. This genus was identified as a monophyletic clade and phylogenetically unrelated to other Bacillus species in studies examining the taxonomic relationships within Bacillus. This branching pattern is also observed in the Genome Taxonomy Database (GTDB).

Two additional Bacillus species (Bacillus alcaliphilum and Bacillus alkalisoli) are found to group with other members of Alkalihalobacillus in phylogenetic trees as well as share the same molecular markers in the form of conserved signature indels (CSIs). However, their transfer was not officially proposed due to the lack of culture strain information. Further revision of this genus is required as additional genomes and novel species are discovered and assigned.

The currently accepted taxonomy is based on the List of Prokaryotic names with Standing in Nomenclature (LPSN) and National Center for Biotechnology Information (NCBI).

16S rRNA based LTP_10_2024

- Alkalihalobacillus
  - - A. alkalilacus (Singh et al. 2018) Gupta et al. 2020
    - A. bogoriensis (Vargas et al. 2005) Patel & Gupta 2020
  - - A. alcalophilus (Vedder 1934) Patel & Gupta 2020
    - - A. pseudalcaliphilus (Nielsen, Fritze & Priest 1995) Patel & Gupta 2020
      - Alkalihalobacillus trypoxylicola (Aizawa et al. 2010) Patel & Gupta 2020

120 marker proteins based GTDB 09-RS220

- Alkalihalobacillus
  - Alkalihalobacillus trypoxylicola
  - - A. alcalophilus
    - A. pseudalcaliphilus

=== Former species ===
Renamed due to: Joshi et al. 2021 (2022 is the date of Validation List inclusion).

current name	former name
Alkalicoccobacillus gibsonii (Nielsen, Fritze & Priest 1995) Joshi et al. 2022	Alkalihalobacillus gibsonii (Nielsen, Fritze & Priest 1995) Gupta et al. 2020
Alkalicoccobacillus murimartini (Borchert et al. 2007) Joshi et al. 2022	Alkalihalobacillus murimartini (Borchert et al. 2007) Patel & Gupta 2020
Alkalihalobacterium alkalinitrilicus (Sorokin, van Pelt & Tourova 2009) Joshi et al. 2022	Alkalihalobacillus alkalinitrilicus (Sorokin, van Pelt & Tourova 2009) Patel & Gupta 2020
Alkalihalobacterium bogoriensis (Vargas et al. 2005) Joshi et al. 2022	Alkalihalobacillus bogoriensis (Vargas et al. 2005) Patel & Gupta 2020
Alkalihalophilus lindianensis (Dou et al. 2016) Joshi et al. 2022	Alkalihalobacillus lindianensis (Dou et al. 2016) Patel & Gupta 2020
Alkalihalophilus marmarensis (Denizci, Kazan & Erarslan 2010) Joshi et al. 2022	Alkalihalobacillus marmarensis (Denizci, Kazan & Erarslan 2010) Patel & Gupta 2020
Alkalihalophilus pseudofirmus (Nielsen, Fritze & Priest 1995) Joshi et al. 2022	Alkalihalobacillus pseudofirmus (Nielsen, Fritze & Priest 1995) Patel & Gupta 2020
Halalkalibacter urbisdiaboli (Liu et al. 2019) Joshi et al. 2022	Alkalihalobacillus urbisdiaboli (Liu et al. 2019) Gupta et al. 2020
Halalkalibacter kiskunsagensis (Borsodi et al. 2017) Joshi et al. 2022	Alkalihalobacillus kiskunsagensis (Borsodi et al. 2017) Gupta et al. 2020
Halalkalibacter nanhaiisediminis (Zhang et al. 2011) Joshi et al. 2022	Alkalihalobacillus nanhaiisediminis (Zhang et al. 2011) Patel & Gupta 2020
Halalkalibacter oceani (Song et al. 2016) Joshi et al. 2022	Alkalihalobacillus oceani (Song et al. 2016) Gupta et al. 2020
Halalkalibacter hemicellulosilyticus (Nogi, Takami & Horikoshi 2005) Joshi et al. 2022	Alkalihalobacillus hemicellulosilyticus corrig. (Nogi, Takami & Horikoshi 2005) Patel & Gupta 2020
Halalkalibacter wakoensis (Nogi, Takami & Horikoshi 2005) Joshi et al. 2022	Alkalihalobacillus wakoensis (Nogi, Takami & Horikoshi 2005) Patel & Gupta 2020
Halalkalibacter okuhidensis (Nowlan et al. 2006) Joshi et al. 2022	Alkalihalobacillus okuhidensis (Nowlan et al. 2006) Patel & Gupta 2020
Halalkalibacter krulwichiae (Yumoto et al. 2003) Joshi et al. 2022	Alkalihalobacillus krulwichiae (Yumoto et al. 2003) Patel & Gupta 2020
Halalkalibacter akibai (Nogi, Takami & Horikoshi 2005) Joshi et al. 2022	Alkalihalobacillus akibai (Nogi, Takami & Horikoshi 2005) Patel & Gupta 2020
Halalkalibacter alkalisediminis (Borsodi et al. 2011) Joshi et al. 2022	Alkalihalobacillus alkalisediminis (Borsodi et al. 2011) Patel & Gupta 2020
Halalkalibacterium halodurans (Nielsen, Fritze & Priest 1995) Joshi et al. 2022	Alkalihalobacillus halodurans (Nielsen, Fritze & Priest 1995) Patel & Gupta 2020
Halalkalibacterium okhensis (Li et al. 2002) Joshi et al. 2022	Alkalihalobacillus okhensis (Li et al. 2002) Patel & Gupta 2020
Halalkalibacterium ligniniphilum (Zhu et al. 2014) Joshi et al. 2022	Alkalihalobacillus ligniniphilus (Zhu et al. 2014) Patel & Gupta 2020
"Pseudalkalibacillus algicola" (Ivanova et al. 2004) Joshi et al. 2021	Alkalihalobacillus algicola (Ivanova et al. 2004) Patel & Gupta 2020
Pseudalkalibacillus berkeleyi (Nedashkovskaya et al. 2012) Joshi et al. 2022	Alkalihalobacillus berkeleyi (Nedashkovskaya et al. 2012) Patel & Gupta 2020
Pseudalkalibacillus caeni (Mo et al. 2020) Joshi et al. 2022	Alkalihalobacillus caeni (Mo et al. 2020) Gupta et al. 2020
Pseudalkalibacillus decolorationis (Heyrman et al. 2003) Joshi et al. 2022	Alkalihalobacillus decolorationis (Heyrman et al. 2003) Patel & Gupta 2020
"Pseudalkalibacillus hemicentroti" (Chen et al. 2011) Joshi et al. 2021	Alkalihalobacillus hemicentroti corrig. (Chen et al. 2011) Patel & Gupta 2020
"Pseudalkalibacillus hwajinpoensis" (Yoon et al. 2004) Joshi et al. 2021	Alkalihalobacillus hwajinpoensis (Yoon et al. 2004) Patel & Gupta 2020
"Pseudalkalibacillus macyae" (Santini, Streimann & vanden Hoven. 2004) Joshi et al. 2021	Alkalihalobacillus macyae (Santini, Streimann & vanden Hoven. 2004) Gupta et al. 2020
"Shouchella alkalilacus" (Singh et al. 2018) Joshi et al. 2021	Alkalihalobacillus alkalilacus (Singh et al. 2018) Gupta et al. 2020
Shouchella clausii (Nielsen, Fritze & Priest 1995) Joshi et al. 2022	Alkalihalobacillus clausii (Nielsen, Fritze & Priest 1995) Patel & Gupta 2020
Shouchella hunanensis (Patel & Gupta 2020) Joshi et al. 2022	Alkalihalobacillus hunanensis Patel & Gupta 2020
Shouchella lonarensis (Reddy et al. 2015) Joshi et al. 2022	Alkalihalobacillus lonarensis (Reddy et al. 2015) Patel & Gupta 2020
Shouchella miscanthi (Shin et al. 2020) Joshi et al. 2022	Alkalihalobacillus miscanthi (Shin et al. 2020) Gupta et al. 2020
Shouchella oshimensis (Yumoto et al. 2005) Joshi et al. 2022	Alkalihalobacillus oshimensis (Yumoto et al. 2005) Patel & Gupta 2020
Shouchella patagoniensis (Olivera, Sineriz & Breccia 2005) Joshi et al. 2022	Alkalihalobacillus patagoniensis (Olivera, Sineriz & Breccia 2005) Patel & Gupta 2020
Shouchella rhizosphaerae (Madhaiyan et al. 2013) Joshi et al. 2022	Alkalihalobacillus rhizosphaerae (Madhaiyan et al. 2013) Patel & Gupta 2020
Shouchella shaceensis (Lei et al. 2014) Joshi et al. 2022	Alkalihalobacillus shaceensis (Lei et al. 2014) Patel & Gupta 2020
Shouchella xiaoxiensis (Chen et al. 2011) Joshi et al. 2022	Alkalihalobacillus xiaoxiensis (Chen et al. 2011) Patel & Gupta 2020

== Biochemical characteristics and molecular signatures ==
Most members of this genus are aerobic or facultatively anaerobic and are found in diverse locations such as hypersaline lakes, coastal regions and soil. All species, with the exception of Alkalihalobacillus okhensis, are able to produce endospores. Motility is variable, with some species possessing peritrichous flagella. The majority of species from this genus are alkaliphilic and halophilic/tolerant, and thus they are able to grow in alkaline conditions, with the optimal growth rate being in the pH range of 9–10 with 1-5% NaCl. Some species are obligately alkaliphilic and require very alkaline conditions to survive. A wide range of temperature (4-45 °C) can be conducive to growth; however, optimal growth occurs in the range of 25-37 °C. Some species are able to produce enzymes such as cellulases and proteases, which are used in laundry detergent manufacturing, xylanases for the pulp paper sector and cyclodextrin glucanotransferase for starch treatment. In addition, A. clausii is diazotrophic and able to convert atmospheric nitrogen into ammonia and it is also able to produce antimicrobial compounds for the manufacturing of probiotic.

Through genomic analysis, ten CSIs have been identified for this genus in the following proteins: RNase adapter RapZ, flagellar basal body M-ring protein FliF, 7-carboxy-7-deazaguanine synthase QueE, peptide chain release factor 3, type I glutamate-ammonia ligase, tRNA threonyl-carbamoyladenosine dehydratase, transcription-repair coupling factor, tRNA uridine-5- carboxymethylaminomethyl (34) synthesis enzyme MnmG, 50S ribosomal protein L11 methyltransferase, and homoserine kinase. These CSIs are specific for Alkalihalobacillus and provide a novel way to molecularly differentiate this genus from other Bacillaceae genera and bacteria.

== See also ==
- List of Bacteria genera
- List of bacterial orders
