= Thioalkalivibrio paradoxus =

Scientific classification
- Domain: Bacteria
- Kingdom: Pseudomonadati
- Phylum: Pseudomonadota
- Class: Gammaproteobacteria
- Order: Chromatiales
- Family: Ectothiorhodospiraceae
- Genus: Thioalkalivibrio
- Species: T. paradoxus

Binomial name
- Thioalkalivibrio paradoxus Sorokin et al. 2002

Species of bacterium

Thioalkalivibrio paradoxus is an alkaliphilic and obligately autotrophic sulfur-oxidizing bacteria. It was first isolated from soda lakes. Its type strain is ARh 1 (= DSM 13531 = JCM 11367). The species is able to grow on thiocyanate.
