= Alkalihalobacillus ligniniphilus =

Scientific classification
- Domain: Bacteria
- Kingdom: Bacillati
- Phylum: Bacillota
- Class: Bacilli
- Order: Bacillales
- Family: Bacillaceae
- Genus: Alkalihalobacillus
- Species: A. ligniniphilus

Binomial name
- Alkalihalobacillus ligniniphilus (Zhu et al. 2014) Patel and Gupta 2020

Type strain
- L1

Synonyms
- Bacillus ligniniphilus

Species of bacterium

Alkalihalobacillus ligniniphilus is a Gram-positive, alkaliphilic and halotolerant bacterium from the genus Alkalihalobacillus which has been isolated from sediments from the South China Sea.
