= Aquisalimonas asiatica =

Scientific classification
- Domain: Bacteria
- Kingdom: Pseudomonadati
- Phylum: Pseudomonadota
- Class: Gammaproteobacteria
- Order: Chromatiales
- Family: Ectothiorhodospiraceae
- Genus: Aquisalimonas
- Species: A. asiatica

Binomial name
- Aquisalimonas asiatica Márquez et al. 2007

Type strain
- CCM 7368, CECT 7151, CGMCC 1.6291, DSM 18102, strain CG12

Synonyms
- Aquasalina asiatica

Genus of bacteria

Aquisalimonas asiatica is a Gram-negative, moderately halophilic, strictly aerobic and motile bacterium from the genus Aquisalimonas which has been isolated from water from the Lake Chagannor from the Inner Mongolia.
