= Arhodomonas aquaeolei =

Scientific classification
- Domain: Bacteria
- Kingdom: Pseudomonadati
- Phylum: Pseudomonadota
- Class: Gammaproteobacteria
- Order: Chromatiales
- Family: Ectothiorhodospiraceae
- Genus: Arhodomonas
- Species: A. aquaeolei

Binomial name
- Arhodomonas aquaeolei Adkins et al. 1993

Species of bacterium

Arhodomonas aquaeolei is a species of the bacterial genus Arhodomonas noted for its ability to grow in an environment of high salinity. It is an aerobic, oval rod-shaped, gram-negative bacterium. It is motile by means a single polar flagellum.

A. aquaeolei is among the most halophilic organisms known. The temperature range for the growth of this bacteria is between 20 °C and 45 °C, with optimal growth at 37 °C and it requires specifically sodium chloride (NaCl) for its growth. (Other salts do not promote growth of A. aquaeolei.) Growth occurred at NaCl concentrations between 6% and 20% in a Campylobacter medium. Although A. aquaeolei is most closely related to purple sulfur bacteria, it does not share those organisms' phototrophic traits. A. aquaeolei has been shown to degrade phenol and phenol based compounds, indicating possible industrial uses. A. aquaeolei causes no known diseases.

== Sources ==
- Adkins, Jon P; Madigan, Michael T.; Mandelco, Linda; Woese, Carl R.; Tanner, Ralph S. (July 1993). "Arhodomonas aquaeolei gen. nov., sp. nov., an Aerobic, Halophilic Bacterium Isolated from a Subterranean Brine". International Journal of Systematic Bacteriology. 43 (3): 514–520. doi:10.1099/00207713-43-3-514. PMID 8347510.
- "Arhodomonas aquaeolei". The Lab Rat.
