= Alkalihalobacillus krulwichiae =

Scientific classification
- Domain: Bacteria
- Kingdom: Bacillati
- Phylum: Bacillota
- Class: Bacilli
- Order: Bacillales
- Family: Bacillaceae
- Genus: Alkalihalobacillus
- Species: A. krulwichiae

Binomial name
- Alkalihalobacillus krulwichiae (Yumoto et al. 2003) Patel and Gupta 2020

Type strain
- AM31D

Synonyms
- Bacillus krulwichiae Bacillus krulwichii

Species of bacterium

Alkalihalobacillus krulwichiae is a Gram-positive, obligate alkaliphilic and facultatively anaerobic bacterium from the genus Alkalihalobacillus which has been isolated from soil from Tsukuba.
