= Streptomyces deccanensis =

Scientific classification
- Domain: Bacteria
- Kingdom: Bacillati
- Phylum: Actinomycetota
- Class: Actinomycetes
- Order: Streptomycetales
- Family: Streptomycetaceae
- Genus: Streptomyces
- Species: S. deccanensis

Binomial name
- Streptomyces deccanensis Dastager et al. 2008

Type strain
- CCTCC AA 207004, DAS-139, DSM 41916, KCTC 19241

Species of bacterium

Streptomyces deccanensis is an alkaliphilic bacterium species from the genus of Streptomyces which has been isolated from soil in the city Gulbarga in the Karnataka in India.

== See also ==
- List of Streptomyces species
