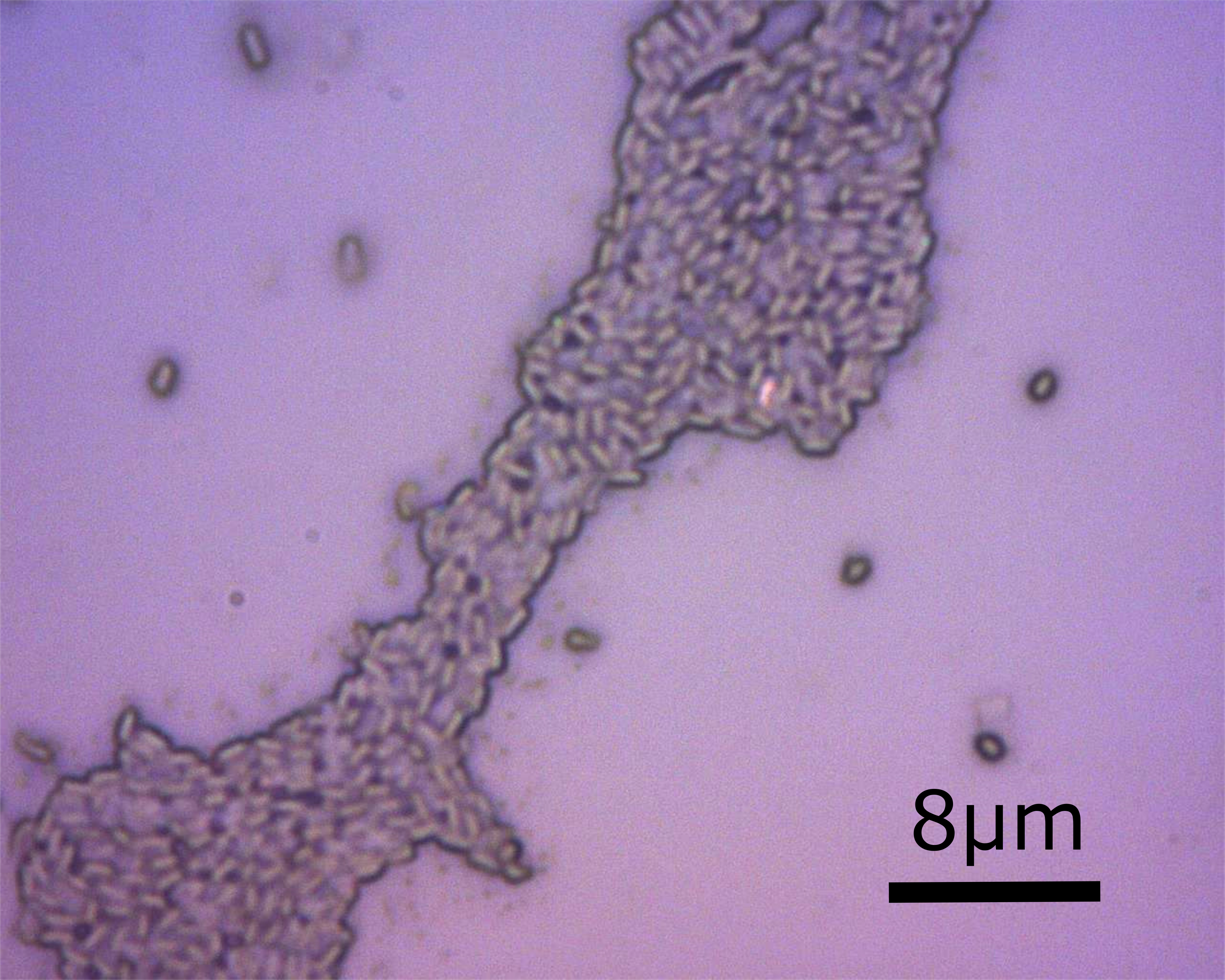
- Alkalihalobacillus clausii from Enterogermina brand on a glass slide

Scientific classification
- Domain: Bacteria
- Kingdom: Bacillati
- Phylum: Bacillota
- Class: Bacilli
- Order: Caryophanales
- Family: Bacillaceae
- Genus: Alkalihalobacillus
- Species: A. clausii

Binomial name
- Alkalihalobacillus clausii (Nielsen et al. 1995) Patel and Gupta 2020

Synonyms
- Bacillus clausii Nielsen et al. 1995

= Alkalihalobacillus clausii =

Species of bacterium

Alkalihalobacillus clausii (synonym Bacillus clausii) is a Gram-positive, rod-shaped, motile, and spore-forming bacterium that lives in the soil but is also a natural microbiota of the mammalian gastrointestinal tract. It is classified as probiotic microorganism that maintains a symbiotic relationship with the host organism. It is currently being studied in relation to respiratory infections and some gastrointestinal disorders. Alkalihalobacillus clausii has been found to produce antimicrobial substances that are active against gram-positive bacteria including Staphylococcus aureus, Enterococcus faecium and Clostridioides difficile. It is used widely as a probiotic in gastrointestinal conditions to maintain gut health, and is therefore considered a good bacterium. Generally considered safe, Alkalihalobacillus clausii can sometimes cause infections, especially in patients with impaired immunity. Immunocompromised individuals, such as patients with cancer, organ transplants, central venous catheters, or prolonged hospitalization, may develop bacteraemia. Newborn babies and young children are also at risk because of their immature immune systems. It is sold as an Antidiarrheal by Sanofi under the brand names Enterogermina and Erceflora.

== History ==
Prior to 2020 Alkalihalobacillus clausii was known as Bacillus clausii. The genus Bacillus had 293 species/subspecies and thus was considered a phylogenetically incoherent group. A study done in 2020 proved it difficult grouping Bacillus species into distinct clades in absence of definitive means. This restricted the placement of new species into this genus. To simplify the relationships among the Bacillus species, 352 available genome sequences (from the family Bacillaceae) were utilized to conduct phylogenomic and comparative genomic analyses. The analysis results showed 36 molecular markers containing conserved signature indels in protein sequences that are distinctly shared by species of six observed clades. Based on the evidence supporting 6 distinct clades, Alkalihalobacillus was transferred from clade into genus. The correct nomenclature is thus Alkalihalobacillus clausii.

The strain AO1125 of Alkalihalobacillus clausii originally came from soil in California.

== Life Cycle ==
The life cycle of Alkalihalobacillus clausii begins in a spore form, which is capable of enduring harsh conditions such as those seen in the stomach acid and bile. After the spores are ingested, they move through the gastrointestinal tract and reach the intestines. In this environment, if favorable conditions are present, the spores germinate and will transition into motile vegetative cells, where A. clausii becomes metabolically active. When the conditions are no longer favorable, A. clausii can return to its spore form and exit the host, allowing for the life cycle to repeat.

== Genomics ==
The genome of Alkalihalobacillus clausii AO1125 was sequenced by researchers using Illumina technology, resulting in 25 contigs and a total length of about 4.3 megabases. The annotation of the genome revealed genes linked to gut colonization, immune system modulation, and stress resistance. Each one of these linkages further supports the probiotic role of Alkalihalobacillus clausii. The analysis also identified antimicrobial resistance (AMR) genes present with low clinical relevance and confirmed the absence of plasmids, suggesting a lowered risk of horizontal gene transfer. Additional genomic studies support these findings by identifying genes similar to those responsible for making gallidermin, an antimicrobial that disrupts biofilm information in harmful bacteria. The presence of these genes suggests that A. clausii may naturally produce antimicrobial molecules, further supporting its potential use as a probiotic.

== Metabolic Pathways ==
Alkalihalobacillus clausii is a spore-forming, obligate aerobic bacterium that demonstrates versatility due to its ability to thrive in alkaline and high salt environments. A. clausii relies on many different metabolic pathways to manage variability in its environmental factors (pH, nutrient availability, salinity etc.); it is a facultative alkaliphile. It is able to catabolize many different organic compounds as both a carbon and energy source, such as carbohydrates, amino acids, and organic acids.

A. clausii is classified as a chemooroganoheterotroph, utilizing Glycolysis, the Pentose Phosphate Pathway, and the Tricarboxylic Acid Cycle for carbohydrate metabolism. A. clausii contains two Futile Cycles, one of which cycles the production of pyruvate and NADPH/NADH through a Malic Enzyme, allowing for metabolic and cellular flexibility. The other cycle works similarly, cycling the production of pyruvate and phosphoenolpyruvate within its metabolism.

When grown in semi-rich medium, A. clausii completely synthesizes Serine and Threonine from other metabolites; not taken up from the medium. In contrast, A. clausii completely takes up Leucine, Isoleucine, and Phenylalanine from the medium; not synthesizing these compounds de novo from glucose and other metabolites. Other amino acids were able to be synthesized de novo and taken up from the medium, showing metabolic flexibility within A. clausii.

Unique metabolic pathways of A. clausii give rise to its probiotic capabilities. It is able to synthesize short-chain fatty acids, B-Vitamins, and antioxidant enzymes, all of which promote health in the gastrointestinal tract of humans and other mammals.

== Probiotic Capabilities ==
Alkalihalobacillus clausii exists in two different forms: dormant spores and active vegetative cells. Vegetative cells are sensitive to extreme environments, such as the human gastrointestinal tract. Because of this, only a small amount of vegetative cell probiotics may reach the intestine unless they are administered in capsules or other protective molds. Spore-forming probiotics have intrinsic resistance, so they can survive the gastrointestinal tract conditions. After traveling through the tract and reaching the intestine, these spore-forming probiotics can germinate and produce vegetative cells. These cells can then provide beneficial probiotic effects.

These probiotic properties of A. clausii can help restore gut microbiota composition altered by antibiotic treatment. A study done on mice with Ceftriaxone-induced intestinal injury helped determine the mechanism A. clausii uses to do this. A. clausii treatment limited the activity of Akkermansia muciniphila, a mucin degrader, which helps maintain the thick mucus layer that supports the integrity of the intestinal epithelium. Additionally, A. clausii works against the damage caused by Ceftriaxone by stimulating mRNA transcription of tight junctions and secretory products that are involved in epithelium repair and mucus synthesis. Inflammation caused by antibiotic treatment was also reduced through A. clausii treatment through the decrease in expression of different inflammatory cytokines that help the intestine reach homeostasis. A decrease in microbial diversity was also observed in mice with antibiotic induced intestinal injury, and treatment with A. clausii was shown to increase this diversity.

A. clausii also produces bacteriocins that inhibit the growth of closely related strains of bacteria. These bacteriocins help provide probiotic benefits to the host by protecting A. clausii from the toxins made by invading bacteria.
