= Halorhodospira halophila =

Scientific classification
- Domain: Bacteria
- Kingdom: Pseudomonadati
- Phylum: Pseudomonadota
- Class: Gammaproteobacteria
- Order: Chromatiales
- Family: Ectothiorhodospiraceae
- Genus: Halorhodospira
- Species: H. halophila

Binomial name
- Halorhodospira halophila (Raymond and Sistrom 1969) Imhoff and Süling 1997

Species of bacterium

Halorhodospira halophila is a species of Halorhodospira distinguished by its ability to grow optimally in an environment of 15–20% salinity. It was formerly called Ectothiorhodospira halophila. It is an anaerobic, rod-shaped Gram-negative bacterium. H. halophila has a flagellum.

== General features ==
H. halophila is among the most halophilic organisms known. It is an obligately photosynthetic and anaerobic purple sulfur bacterium with a spiral morphology. H. halophila exhibits autotrophic growth in saturated NaCl concentrations. H. halophila is a Gram-negative bacterium within the gamma subdivision of the phylum Proteobacteria and is known to be phototrophic (Class: Gammaproteobacteria). H. halophila was the first phototrophic, extreme halophile to have its genome sequenced. The genome consists of 2,678,452 bp, encoding 2,493 predicted genes, as determined by automated genome annotation. 2,407 proteins are predicted from that genome, and 1,905 have been assigned a putative function. H. halophila produces organic solutes such as glycine, betaine and ectoine, to balance the osmotic pressure. Each bacterium has a flagellum. Growth was demonstrated in hypersaline environments, such as crystallizer ponds, that have a salinity of 25% or higher.

== Metabolism ==
H. halophila oxidizes sulfide to sulfur, which is deposited outside the cell and further oxidized to sulfate.

H. halophila contains a large number of metabolic pathways, such as glycolysis, the citrate cycle, and amino acid metabolism. Its ability for photoautotrophic growth under extreme conditions, and it is distinguished by its characteristic sulfur metabolism. The proteome of H. halophila is highly acidic. The bacterium has a low cytoplasmic potassium content, even when grown in medium containing high KCl concentrations, as has been established by x-ray microanalysis and plasma emission spectrometry. H. halophila causes no known diseases.

== Applications ==
H. halophila could play a strong role in hydrogen generation, as hydrogen gas is a byproduct of the nitrogen fixation catalyzed by its nitrogenase. H. halophila also serves in the production of organic solutes such as glycine, betaine, ectoine, and trehalose.

Photoactive yellow protein, PYP, is a blue-light sensor from the bacterium H. halophila. Photoactive proteins such as PYP are generally accepted as model systems for studying protein signal state formation.
