= Alkalihalobacillus lindianensis =

Scientific classification
- Domain: Bacteria
- Kingdom: Bacillati
- Phylum: Bacillota
- Class: Bacilli
- Order: Bacillales
- Family: Bacillaceae
- Genus: Alkalihalobacillus
- Species: A. lindianensis

Binomial name
- Alkalihalobacillus lindianensis (Dou et al. 2016) Patel and Gupta 2020

Type strain
- 12-3

Synonyms
- Bacillus lindianensis

Species of bacterium

Alkalihalobacillus lindianensis is a Gram-positive, alkaliphilic, rod-shaped, endospore-forming and halotolerant bacterium from the genus Alkalihalobacillus.
