= Thiohalomonas denitrificans =

Scientific classification
- Domain: Bacteria
- Kingdom: Pseudomonadati
- Phylum: Pseudomonadota
- Class: Gammaproteobacteria
- Order: Chromatiales
- Family: Ectothiorhodospiraceae
- Genus: Thiohalomonas
- Species: T. denitrificans

Binomial name
- Thiohalomonas denitrificans Sorokin et al. 2007

Type strain
- DSM 15841, UNIQEM U222, strain HLD 2, HLD16

Species of bacterium

Thiohalomonas denitrificans is a moderately halophilic, obligately chemolithoautotrophic and sulfur-oxidizing bacterium from the genus of Thiohalomonas which has been isolated from sediments of hypersaline lakes from Siberia in Russia.
