= Alkalihalobacillus alkalisediminis =

Scientific classification
- Domain: Bacteria
- Kingdom: Bacillati
- Phylum: Bacillota
- Class: Bacilli
- Order: Bacillales
- Family: Bacillaceae
- Genus: Alkalihalobacillus
- Species: A. alkalisediminis

Binomial name
- Alkalihalobacillus alkalisediminis (Borsodi et al. 2011) Patel and Gupta 2020

Type strain
- K1-25

Synonyms
- Bacillus alkalinisediminis Bacillus alkalisediminis

Species of bacterium

Alkalihalobacillus alkalisediminis is a Gram-positive, alkaliphilic and non-motile bacterium from the genus Alkalihalobacillus.
