= Thiohalospira halophila =

Scientific classification
- Domain: Bacteria
- Kingdom: Pseudomonadati
- Phylum: Pseudomonadota
- Class: Gammaproteobacteria
- Order: Chromatiales
- Family: Ectothiorhodospiraceae
- Genus: Thiohalospira
- Species: T. halophila

Binomial name
- Thiohalospira halophila Sorokin et al. 2008

Type strain
- DSM 15071, UNIQEM U219, HL23, HL25, HL4, HL 3

Genus of bacteria

Thiohalospira halophila is a halophilic, obligately chemolithoautotrophic and sulfur-oxidizing gram-negative bacterium from the genus of Thiohalospira which has been isolated from a hypersaline lake from Siberia.
