= Halorhodospira neutriphila =

Scientific classification
- Domain: Bacteria
- Kingdom: Pseudomonadati
- Phylum: Pseudomonadota
- Class: Gammaproteobacteria
- Order: Chromatiales
- Family: Ectothiorhodospiraceae
- Genus: Halorhodospira
- Species: H. neutriphila

Binomial name
- Halorhodospira neutriphila Hirschler-Réa et al. 2003

Type strain
- DSM 15116, JCM 17835, SG 3301

Synonyms
- Halorhodospira neutrophila

Genus of bacteria

Halorhodospira neutriphila is a bacterium from the genus of Halorhodospira which has been isolated from a microbial mat from a marine saltern from Rhone Delta in France. The microbial mat forms at the sediment surface and is between 10 and 20 mm thick, below a fine layer (2–3 cm) of gypsum crust. The mat is composed of a red layer of purple bacteria strains below a green layer of cyanobacteria, interspersed with sulfur globules, and occasionally covered by halite deposits. These mat forming microbes live in anoxic muds and sediments and form a benthic mat in a hypersaline lagoon environment where the salinity of the water ranges from 240-320‰ of total salinity. H. neutriphila was isolated from the red layer of the microbial layer and found to be extremely halophilic and well adapted to withstand the extreme saline conditions of their modified marine habitat. The type strain was identified as strain SG 3301T.

== Phenotypic Characteristics ==
H. neutriphila is a phototrophic, purple bacteria with a spirilloid morphology and motile with polar flagella. This species of bacteria is gram negative and the cell size ranges (width by length) from 1-1.2 μm x 2-5 μm. H. neutriphila has a photosynthetic intracellular membrane system that consists of lamellar stacks with spirilloxanthin and BChl a as the major carotenoids.

== Optimal Growth ==
Optimal growth for H. neutriphila occurs with a 9-12% (w/v) NaCl presence in culture and a medium supplemented with 1mM Na_{2}S.9H_{2}0, 2mM acetate, 1mM succinate, and 0.05% yeast extract. Their metabolism is most efficient with sulfide and acetate as electron donors and CO_{2} as the carbon source. Maximum growth occurs at a pH range of 6.8 - 7 at 30-35 °C under a light intensity of 5000 lux with a 16h:8h light to dark cycle. The growth rate for the type strain is recorded to be 0.034 h^ -1 and cell replication occurs through binary fission.

== Genetic Characteristics ==
The composition of DNA bases for the type strain is 74.5 mol% G+C. The 16S rDNA gene, with a partial genome length of 1357 base pairs, was used to determine the relatedness of the H. neutriphila type strain to other strains, including SG 3304 with which it shares 100% homology. The type strain was closely related to the species Rhodovibrio sodomensis with 98.8% homology and Halorhodospira halophila with 94.6% homology. The strains SG 3301T and SG 3304 were determined to be genetically, morphologically, and physiologically different enough from other species in the genus Halorhodospira to be classified as a new species; they were named Halorhodospira neutriphila sp. nov.
