= Spiribacter curvatus =

Scientific classification
- Domain: Bacteria
- Kingdom: Pseudomonadati
- Phylum: Pseudomonadota
- Class: Gammaproteobacteria
- Order: Chromatiales
- Family: Ectothiorhodospiraceae
- Genus: Spiribacter
- Species: S. curvatus

Binomial name
- Spiribacter curvatus Leon et al. 2015

Type strain
- CECT 8396, DSM 28542, UAH-SP71

Genus of bacteria

Spiribacter curvatus is a Gram-negative, strictly aerobic and non-motile bacterium from the genus of Spiribacter which has been isolated from brine from a saltern from Santa Pola in Spain.
