= Streptomyces fukangensis =

Scientific classification
- Domain: Bacteria
- Kingdom: Bacillati
- Phylum: Actinomycetota
- Class: Actinomycetia
- Order: Streptomycetales
- Family: Streptomycetaceae
- Genus: Streptomyces
- Species: S. fukangensis

Binomial name
- Streptomyces fukangensis Zhang et al. 2014

Type strain
- BCRC 16945, EGI 80050, JCM 19127

Species of bacterium

Streptomyces fukangensis is an alkaliphilic bacterium species from the genus of Streptomyces which has been isolated from desert soil from Xinjiang in China.

== See also ==
- List of Streptomyces species
