= Spiribacter aquaticus =

Scientific classification
- Domain: Bacteria
- Kingdom: Pseudomonadati
- Phylum: Pseudomonadota
- Class: Gammaproteobacteria
- Order: Chromatiales
- Family: Ectothiorhodospiraceae
- Genus: Spiribacter
- Species: S. aquaticus

Binomial name
- Spiribacter aquaticus León et al. 2017

Type strain
- CECT 9238, LMG 30005, strain SP30

Genus of bacteria

Spiribacter aquaticus is a Gram-negative and moderately halophilic bacterium from the genus of Spiribacter which has been isolated from a solar saltern from Santa Pola in Spain.
