= Alkalihalobacillus kiskunsagensis =

Scientific classification
- Domain: Bacteria
- Kingdom: Bacillati
- Phylum: Bacillota
- Class: Bacilli
- Order: Bacillales
- Family: Bacillaceae
- Genus: Alkalihalobacillus
- Species: A. kiskunsagensis

Binomial name
- Alkalihalobacillus kiskunsagensis (Borsodi et al. 2017) Gupta et al. 2020

Type strain
- B16-24

Synonyms
- Bacillus kiskunsagensis

Species of bacterium

Alkalihalobacillus kiskunsagensis is a gram-positive, alkaliphilic, moderately halophilic and non-motile bacterium from the genus Alkalihalobacillus.
