= Streptomyces sodiiphilus =

Scientific classification
- Domain: Bacteria
- Kingdom: Bacillati
- Phylum: Actinomycetota
- Class: Actinomycetes
- Order: Streptomycetales
- Family: Streptomycetaceae
- Genus: Streptomyces
- Species: S. sodiiphilus

Binomial name
- Streptomyces sodiiphilus Li et al. 2005

Type strain
- CCTCC AA 203015, CIP 107975, DSM 41839, JCM 13581, YIM 80305

Species of bacterium

Streptomyces sodiiphilus is an alkaliphilic bacterium species from the genus of Streptomyces which has been isolated from a muddy sample from the Chaka salt lake in the Qinghai Province in China.

== See also ==
- List of Streptomyces species
