= Alkalihalobacillus bogoriensis =

Scientific classification
- Domain: Bacteria
- Kingdom: Bacillati
- Phylum: Bacillota
- Class: Bacilli
- Order: Bacillales
- Family: Bacillaceae
- Genus: Alkalihalobacillus
- Species: A. bogoriensis

Binomial name
- Alkalihalobacillus bogoriensis (Vargas et al. 2005) Patel and Gupta 2020

Type strain
- LBB3

Synonyms
- Bacillus bogoriensis

Species of bacterium

Alkalihalobacillus bogoriensis is a Gram-positive, strictly aerobic, spore-forming, alkaliphilic and non-motil bacterium from the genus Alkalihalobacillus which has been isolated from Lake Bogoria.
