= Alkalihalobacillus oshimensis =

Scientific classification
- Domain: Bacteria
- Kingdom: Bacillati
- Phylum: Bacillota
- Class: Bacilli
- Order: Bacillales
- Family: Bacillaceae
- Genus: Alkalihalobacillus
- Species: A. oshimensis

Binomial name
- Alkalihalobacillus oshimensis (Yumoto et al. 2005) Patel and Gupta 2020

Type strain
- K11

Synonyms
- Bacillus oshimae Bacillus oshimensis

Species of bacterium

Alkalihalobacillus oshimensis is a Gram-positive, aerobic, facultatively alkaliphilic, halophilic and halotolerant bacterium from the genus Alkalihalobacillus which has been isolated from soil from Oshyamanbe from Japan.
