= Kordiimonas gwangyangensis =

Scientific classification
- Domain: Bacteria
- Kingdom: Pseudomonadati
- Phylum: Pseudomonadota
- Class: Alphaproteobacteria
- Order: Kordiimonadales
- Family: Temperatibacteraceae
- Genus: Kordiimonas
- Species: K. gwangyangensis

Binomial name
- Kordiimonas gwangyangensis Kwon et al. 2005

Species of bacterium

Kordiimonas gwangyangensis (strain GW14-5^{T}) is a marine bacterium that can degrade a number of polycyclic hydrocarbons. It was first found in Gwangyang Bay.
