= Alkalilimnicola ehrlichii =

Scientific classification
- Domain: Bacteria
- Kingdom: Pseudomonadati
- Phylum: Pseudomonadota
- Class: Gammaproteobacteria
- Order: Chromatiales
- Family: Ectothiorhodospiraceae
- Genus: Alkalilimnicola
- Species: A. ehrlichii

Binomial name
- Alkalilimnicola ehrlichii Hoeft et al. 2007

Species of bacterium

Alkalilimnicola ehrlichii is a species of arsenite-oxidizing haloalkaliphilic gammaproteobacterium capable of chemoautotrophic or heterotrophic growth. It is Gram-negative, motile and short-rod-shaped. The type strain is MLHE-1^{T} (=DSM 17681^{T} =ATCC BAA-1101^{T}).
