= Spiribacter salinus =

Scientific classification
- Domain: Bacteria
- Kingdom: Pseudomonadati
- Phylum: Pseudomonadota
- Class: Gammaproteobacteria
- Order: Chromatiales
- Family: Ectothiorhodospiraceae
- Genus: Spiribacter
- Species: S. salinus

Binomial name
- Spiribacter salinus Leon et al. 2014

Type strain
- CECT 8282, IBRC-M 10768, LMG 27464, strain M19-40

Genus of bacteria

Spiribacter salinus is a moderately halophilic bacterium from the genus of Spiribacter.
