= Aquisalimonas halophila =

Scientific classification
- Domain: Bacteria
- Kingdom: Pseudomonadati
- Phylum: Pseudomonadota
- Class: Gammaproteobacteria
- Order: Chromatiales
- Family: Ectothiorhodospiraceae
- Genus: Aquisalimonas
- Species: A. halophila

Binomial name
- Aquisalimonas halophila Zhang et al. 2014

Type strain
- CCTCC AB 2012043, DSM 25902, YIM 95345

Genus of bacteria

Aquisalimonas halophila is a Gram-negative, moderately halophilic and strictly aerobic bacterium from the genus Aquisalimonas which has been isolated from soil from a hypersaline mine from Yunnan in China.
