= Natronospira =

Scientific classification
- Domain: Bacteria
- Kingdom: Pseudomonadati
- Phylum: Pseudomonadota
- Class: Gammaproteobacteria
- Order: Chromatiales
- Family: Ectothiorhodospiraceae
- Genus: Natronospira; Sorokin et al. 2017

Type species
- Natronospira proteinivora

Species
- N. proteinivora

Genus of bacteria

Natronospira is an extremely halotolerant and alkaliphilic genus of gram-negative bacteria from the family of Ectothiorhodospiraceae with one known species (Natronospira proteinivora). Natronospira proteinivora has been isolated from hypersaline soda lakes from the Kulunda Steppe in Russia.
