= Alkalispirillum =

Scientific classification
- Domain: Bacteria
- Kingdom: Pseudomonadati
- Phylum: Pseudomonadota
- Class: Gammaproteobacteria
- Order: Chromatiales
- Family: Ectothiorhodospiraceae
- Genus: Alkalispirillum; Rijkenberg et al. 2025
- Species: A. mobile

Binomial name
- Alkalispirillum mobile Rijkenberg et al. 2025

Genus of bacteria

Alkalispirillum is a moderately halophilic and alkaliphilic genus of gram-negative bacteria from the family of Ectothiorhodospiraceae with one known species, Alkalispirillum mobile.
