= Acidihalobacter prosperus =

Scientific classification
- Domain: Bacteria
- Kingdom: Pseudomonadati
- Phylum: Pseudomonadota
- Class: Gammaproteobacteria
- Order: Chromatiales
- Family: Ectothiorhodospiraceae
- Genus: Acidihalobacter
- Species: A. prosperus

Binomial name
- Acidihalobacter prosperus Pablo et al. 2015

Type strain
- DSM 5130, JCM 30709

Synonyms
- Thiobacillus prosperus Huber and Stetter 1989

Species of bacterium

Acidihalobacter prosperus is a halotolerant and acidophile bacterium from the genus of Acidihalobacter which has been isolated from geothermally heated sea sediments near a vulcano in Italy.
