= Spiribacter roseus =

Scientific classification
- Domain: Bacteria
- Kingdom: Pseudomonadati
- Phylum: Pseudomonadota
- Class: Gammaproteobacteria
- Order: Chromatiales
- Family: Ectothiorhodospiraceae
- Genus: Spiribacter
- Species: S. roseus

Binomial name
- Spiribacter roseus Leon et al. 2016

Type strain
- IBRC-M 11076, SSL25, SSL4, SSL50, SSL97

Genus of bacteria

Spiribacter roseus is a Gram-negative and non-motile bacterium from the genus of Spiribacter which has been isolated from a saltern from Isla Cristina in Spain.
