= Aquisalimonas lutea =

Scientific classification
- Domain: Bacteria
- Kingdom: Pseudomonadati
- Phylum: Pseudomonadota
- Class: Gammaproteobacteria
- Order: Chromatiales
- Family: Ectothiorhodospiraceae
- Genus: Aquisalimonas
- Species: A. lutea

Binomial name
- Aquisalimonas lutea Infante-dominguez et al. 2015

Type strain
- CCM 8472, CECT 8326, LMG 27614, BA42AL-1

Genus of bacteria

Aquisalimonas lutea is a Gram-negative, moderately halophilic, strictly aerobic and motile bacterium from the genus Aquisalimonas which has been isolated from water of a saltern from Santa Pola in Spain.
