= Halalkalibacillus =

Scientific classification
- Domain: Bacteria
- Kingdom: Bacillati
- Phylum: Bacillota
- Class: Bacilli
- Order: Bacillales
- Family: Bacillaceae
- Genus: Halalkalibacillus; Echigo et al. 2007

Type species
- Halalkalibacillus halophilus Echigo et al. 2007

Species
- H. halophilus; H. sediminis

Genus of bacteria

Halalkalibacillus is a Gram-positive, rod-shaped, moderately halophilic, alkaliphilic, aerobic and motile genus of bacteria from the family of Bacillaceae with one known species (Halalkalibacillus halophilus).

== Phylogeny ==
The currently accepted taxonomy is based on the List of Prokaryotic names with Standing in Nomenclature (LPSN) and National Center for Biotechnology Information (NCBI).

16S rRNA based LTP_10_2024

- - Allobacillus
  - - - Allobacillus saliphilus
      - - Halalkalibacillus
          - H. halophilus Echigo et al. 2007
          - H. sediminis He et al. 2020
    - other

120 marker proteins based GTDB 09-RS220

- - Halalkalibacillus sediminis
  - - Allobacillus
    - - Halalkalibacillus halophilus
      - other

== See also ==
- List of bacterial orders
- List of bacteria genera
