= Alkalihalobacillus murimartini =

Scientific classification
- Domain: Bacteria
- Kingdom: Bacillati
- Phylum: Bacillota
- Class: Bacilli
- Order: Bacillales
- Family: Bacillaceae
- Genus: Alkalihalobacillus
- Species: A. murimartini

Binomial name
- Alkalihalobacillus murimartini (Borchert et al. 2007) Patel and Gupta 2020

Type strain
- LMG 21005

Synonyms
- Bacillus murimartini

Species of bacterium

Alkalihalobacillus murimartini is a bacterium from the genus Alkalihalobacillus which has been isolated from the sponge Plakortis simplex from the Sula-Ridge from the Norwegian Sea.
