= Ectothiorhodosinus =

Scientific classification
- Domain: Bacteria
- Kingdom: Pseudomonadati
- Phylum: Pseudomonadota
- Class: Gammaproteobacteria
- Order: Chromatiales
- Family: Ectothiorhodospiraceae
- Genus: Ectothiorhodosinus; Gorlenko et al. 2007

Type species
- Ectothiorhodosinus mongolicus

Species
- E. mongolicus

Genus of bacteria

Ectothiorhodosinus is a genus of gram-negative bacteria from the family of Ectothiorhodospiraceae with one known species (Ectothiorhodosinus mongolicus). Ectothiorhodosinus mongolicus has been isolated the Lake Dzun-Uldziit-Nur in the Mongolia.
