= Thiorhodospira =

Scientific classification
- Domain: Bacteria
- Kingdom: Pseudomonadati
- Phylum: Pseudomonadota
- Class: Gammaproteobacteria
- Order: Chromatiales
- Family: Ectothiorhodospiraceae
- Genus: Thiorhodospira; Bryantseva et al. 1999

Type species
- Thiorhodospira sibirica

Species
- T. sibirica

Genus of bacteria

Thiorhodospira is a genus of gram-negative bacteria from the family of Ectothiorhodospiraceae with one known species (Thiorhodospira sibirica).
