= Alkalilimnicola =

Scientific classification
- Domain: Bacteria
- Kingdom: Pseudomonadati
- Phylum: Pseudomonadota
- Class: Gammaproteobacteria
- Order: Chromatiales
- Family: Ectothiorhodospiraceae
- Genus: Alkalilimnicola corrig. Yakimov et al. 2001

Type species
- A. halodurans

Genus of bacteria

Alkalilimnicola is a genus of gram-negative bacteria in the phylum Pseudomonadota (Bacteria).

== Etymology ==
The name Alkalilimnicola derives from alkali (from Arabic al-qalyi, the ashes of saltwort), soda ash; limnos, Greek, pool of standing water, lake; cola (from Latin incola) a dweller, inhabitant, to give Alcalilimnicola, a dweller of alkaline lakes.

== Species ==
The genus contains:

- A. ehrlichii Hoeft et al. 2007 (Latin ehrlichii, of Ehrlich, named in honour of professor emeritus Henry Lutz Ehrlich for his broad scientific, teaching, and leadership contributions to the field of geomicrobiology, with specific reference to his work on the bacterial oxidation of arsenite) Among its other traits, A. erhlichii oxidizes carbon monoxide at ambient and subambient levels.
- A. halodurans Yakimov et al. 2001, (type species of the genus), Greek hals, halos (ἅλς, ἁλός), salt; Latin durans, enduring, to give halodurans, salt-enduring

== See also ==
- Bacterial taxonomy
- Microbiology
