= Alkalihalobacillus urbisdiaboli =

Scientific classification
- Domain: Bacteria
- Kingdom: Bacillati
- Phylum: Bacillota
- Class: Bacilli
- Order: Bacillales
- Family: Bacillaceae
- Genus: Alkalihalobacillus
- Species: A. urbisdiaboli

Binomial name
- Alkalihalobacillus urbisdiaboli (Liu et al. 2019) Gupta et al. 2020

Type strain
- FJAT-45385

Synonyms
- Bacillus urbisdiaboli

Species of bacterium

Alkalihalobacillus urbisdiaboli is a rod-shaped, endospore-forming and facultative anaerobic bacterium from the genus Alkalihalobacillus which has been isolated from soil from Devil City in China.
