= Muricauda ruestringensis =

Scientific classification
- Domain: Bacteria
- Kingdom: Pseudomonadati
- Phylum: Bacteroidota
- Class: Flavobacteriia
- Order: Flavobacteriales
- Family: Flavobacteriaceae
- Genus: Muricauda
- Species: M. ruestringensis

Binomial name
- Muricauda ruestringensis Bruns, Rohde & Berthe-Corti, 2001

Species of bacterium

Muricauda ruestringensis is a bacterium. It is a facultatively anaerobic, appendaged bacterium first isolated from the North Sea. Its nearest relative is Zobellia uliginosa. The type strain is strain B1T (= DSM 13258T = LMG 19739T).
