= Muricauda taeanensis =

Scientific classification
- Domain: Bacteria
- Kingdom: Pseudomonadati
- Phylum: Bacteroidota
- Class: Flavobacteriia
- Order: Flavobacteriales
- Family: Flavobacteriaceae
- Genus: Muricauda
- Species: M. taeanensis

Binomial name
- Muricauda taeanensis Kim et al. 2013

Type strain
- JCM 17757, KACC 16195, strain 105

Synonyms
- Muricauda antarctica Wu et al. 2013

Species of bacterium

Muricauda taeanensis is a Gram-negative, strictly aerobic, heterotrophic and moderate halophilic bacterium from the genus of Muricauda which has been isolated from tidal flat sediments of Taean in Korea.
