= Aidingimonas =

Scientific classification
- Domain: Bacteria
- Kingdom: Pseudomonadati
- Phylum: Pseudomonadota
- Class: Gammaproteobacteria
- Order: Oceanospirillales
- Family: Halomonadaceae
- Genus: Aidingimonas; Wang et al. 2009

Type species
- A. halophila

Genus of bacteria

Aidingimonas is a genus in the phylum Pseudomonadota (Bacteria).

== Etymology ==
The name Aidingimonas derives from: Neo-Latin noun Aidingum, Aiding (a lake located in Xinjiang province of north-west China); and monas (μονάς), monad a unit, a monad; Neo-Latin thus Aidingimonas, a monad from Aiding Lake.

Members of the genus Aidingimonas can be referred to as aidingimonads (viz. Trivialisation of names).

== Species ==
The genus contains a single species, namely A. halophila ( Wang et al. 2009, type species of the genus); hals, halos (ἅλς, ἁλός), salt; and phila philē (φίλη)), friend, loving; thus halophila, salt-loving).

== See also ==
- Bacterial taxonomy
- Microbiology
