= Spiribacter =

Scientific classification
- Domain: Bacteria
- Kingdom: Pseudomonadati
- Phylum: Pseudomonadota
- Class: Gammaproteobacteria
- Order: Chromatiales
- Family: Ectothiorhodospiraceae
- Genus: Spiribacter; Leon et al. 2014

Type species
- Spiribacter salinus

Species
- S. aquaticus; S. curvatus; S. roseus; S. salinus; S. vilamensis

Synonyms
- Halopeptonella Menes et al. 2016

Genus of bacteria

Spiribacter is a genus of gram-negative bacteria from the family Ectothiorhodospiraceae.
