= Natronocella =

Scientific classification
- Domain: Bacteria
- Kingdom: Pseudomonadati
- Phylum: Pseudomonadota
- Class: Gammaproteobacteria
- Order: Chromatiales
- Family: Ectothiorhodospiraceae
- Genus: Natronocella; Sorokin et al. 2007

Type species
- Natronocella acetinitrilica

Species
- N. acetinitrilica

Genus of bacteria

Natronocella is a genus of gram-negative bacteria from the family of Ectothiorhodospiraceae with one known species (Natronocella acetinitrilica).
