= Alkalihalobacillus wakoensis =

Scientific classification
- Domain: Bacteria
- Kingdom: Bacillati
- Phylum: Bacillota
- Class: Bacilli
- Order: Bacillales
- Family: Bacillaceae
- Genus: Alkalihalobacillus
- Species: A. wakoensis

Binomial name
- Alkalihalobacillus wakoensis (Nogi et al. 2005) Patel and Gupta 2020

Type strain
- N-1

Synonyms
- Bacillus wakoensis

Species of bacterium

Alkalihalobacillus wakoensis is a bacterium from the genus Alkalihalobacillus.
