= Muricauda zhangzhouensis =

Scientific classification
- Domain: Bacteria
- Kingdom: Pseudomonadati
- Phylum: Bacteroidota
- Class: Flavobacteriia
- Order: Flavobacteriales
- Family: Flavobacteriaceae
- Genus: Muricauda
- Species: M. zhangzhouensis

Binomial name
- Muricauda zhangzhouensis Yang et al. 2013

Type strain
- 12C25, CGMCC 1.11028, DSM 25030, MCCC 1F01096

Species of bacterium

Muricauda zhangzhouensis is a Gram-negative, rod-shaped and non-motile bacterium from the genus of Muricauda which has been isolated from mangrove sediments from the Fugong Mangrove Nature Reservation Area in the Fujian province in China.
