= Alkalihalobacillus caeni =

Scientific classification
- Domain: Bacteria
- Kingdom: Bacillati
- Phylum: Bacillota
- Class: Bacilli
- Order: Bacillales
- Family: Bacillaceae
- Genus: Alkalihalobacillus
- Species: A. caeni

Binomial name
- Alkalihalobacillus caeni (Mo et al. 2020) Gupta et al. 2020

Type strain
- HB172195

Synonyms
- Bacillus caeni

Species of bacterium

Alkalihalobacillus caeni is a Gram-variable, aerobic and motile bacterium from the genus Alkalihalobacillus which has been isolated from sediments from the Bamen Bay mangrove forest in China.
