= Thioalbus =

Scientific classification
- Domain: Bacteria
- Kingdom: Pseudomonadati
- Phylum: Pseudomonadota
- Class: Gammaproteobacteria
- Order: Chromatiales
- Family: Ectothiorhodospiraceae
- Genus: Thioalbus; Park et al. 2011

Type species
- Thioalbus denitrificans

Species
- T. denitrificans

Genus of bacteria

Thioalbus is a mesophilic, facultatively anaerobic and autotrophic genus of bacteria from the family of Ectothiorhodospiraceae with one known species (Thioalbus denitrificans). Thioalbus denitrificans has been isolated from sediments from the Sea of Japan in Korea.
