= Alkalihalobacillus berkeleyi =

Scientific classification
- Domain: Bacteria
- Kingdom: Bacillati
- Phylum: Bacillota
- Class: Bacilli
- Order: Bacillales
- Family: Bacillaceae
- Genus: Alkalihalobacillus
- Species: A. berkeleyi

Binomial name
- Alkalihalobacillus berkeleyi (Nedashkovskaya et al. 2012) Patel and Gupta 2020

Type strain
- KMM 6244

Synonyms
- Bacillus berkeleyi

Species of bacterium

Alkalihalobacillus berkeleyi is a bacterium from the genus Alkalihalobacillus which has been isolated from a sea urchin (Strongylocentrotus intermedius).
