= Methylonatrum =

Scientific classification
- Domain: Bacteria
- Kingdom: Pseudomonadati
- Phylum: Pseudomonadota
- Class: Gammaproteobacteria
- Order: Chromatiales
- Family: Ectothiorhodospiraceae
- Genus: Methylonatrum; Sorokin et al. 2007

Type species
- Methylonatrum kenyense

Species
- M. kenyense

Genus of bacteria

Methylonatrum is a genus of bacteria from the class of purple sulfur bacteria with one known species (Methylohalomonas lacus). Methylonatrum kenyense has been isolated from hypersaline lakes from the Kulunda Steppe in Russia.
