= Thioalkalivibrio =

Scientific classification
- Domain: Bacteria
- Kingdom: Pseudomonadati
- Phylum: Pseudomonadota
- Class: Gammaproteobacteria
- Order: Chromatiales
- Family: Ectothiorhodospiraceae
- Genus: Thioalkalivibrio; Sorokin et al. 2001

Type species
- Thioalkalivibrio versutus corrig. Sorokin et al. 2001

Species
- T. denitrificans T. halophilus T. jannaschii T. nitratireducens T. nitratis T. paradoxus T. sulfidiphilus T. thiocyanodenitrificans T. thiocyanoxidans T. versutus

Synonyms
- Thioalcalovibrio

Genus of bacteria

Thioalkalivibrio is a Gram-negative, mostly halophilic bacterial genus of the family Ectothiorhodospiraceae.

== Occurrence ==
In the last decade, several species of Thioalkalivibrio have been discovered, but these chemolithoautotrophic, haloalkaliphilic sulfur-oxidizing bacteria had only been found in soda lakes in alkaline and saline habitats. However, Sorokin and colleagues in 2012 isolated and grew out a novel Thioalkalivibrio sulfidiphilus, strain HL-EbGr7T, from a full-scale wastewater bioreactor after the hydrogen sulfide gas had been removed/

== Structure ==
The Thioalkalivibrio sulfidiphilus strain HL-EbGr7T cells is long, slender, slightly curved, rod-shaped bacteria with a polar flagellum for motility. It has a gram-negative cell wall and the colonies are up to 2 mm in diameter.

== Genetics ==
Thioalkalivibrio sulfidiphilus strain HL-EbGr7T is closely related to Thioalkalivibrio denitrificans within the Gammaproteobacteria based on 16S rRNA gene. It contains a singular chromosome that is 3.46 Mbp with a G+C content of 65.06% and 3,366 genes.

== Metabolism ==
Strain HL-EBGrtT was obligately aerobic, could not use nitrite or nitrate as a nitrogen source, but could use urea and ammonia. It grew on both thiosulfate and sulfide, showing preference for sulfide. It also oxidized polysulfide, elemental sulfur and tetrathionate. It was sensitive to fully aerobic conditions, grew optimally at pH of 10, a salt content of 0.4 M and an optimal temperature of 35°Celsius. It was sensitive to chloramphenicol and resistant to ampicillin, kanamycin, tetracycline and rifampicin.
