= Alkalihalobacillus nanhaiisediminis =

Scientific classification
- Domain: Bacteria
- Kingdom: Bacillati
- Phylum: Bacillota
- Class: Bacilli
- Order: Bacillales
- Family: Bacillaceae
- Genus: Alkalihalobacillus
- Species: A. nanhaiisediminis

Binomial name
- Alkalihalobacillus nanhaiisediminis (Zhang et al. 2011) Patel and Gupta 2020

Type strain
- NH3

Synonyms
- Bacillus nanhaiisediminis

Species of bacterium

Alkalihalobacillus nanhaiisediminis is a Gram-positive and rod-shaped bacterium from the genus Alkalihalobacillus which has been isolated from sediments from the South China Sea.
