= Alkalihalobacillus macyae =

Scientific classification
- Domain: Bacteria
- Kingdom: Bacillati
- Phylum: Bacillota
- Class: Bacilli
- Order: Bacillales
- Family: Bacillaceae
- Genus: Alkalihalobacillus
- Species: A. macyae

Binomial name
- Alkalihalobacillus macyae (Santini et al. 2004) Patel and Gupta 2020

Synonyms
- Bacillus macyae

Species of bacterium

Alkalihalobacillus macyae is a Gram-positive and motile bacterium from the genusAlkalihalobacillus which has been isolated from a gold mine in Australia.
