= Alkalihalobacillus alkalinitrilicus =

Scientific classification
- Domain: Bacteria
- Kingdom: Bacillati
- Phylum: Bacillota
- Class: Bacilli
- Order: Bacillales
- Family: Bacillaceae
- Genus: Alkalihalobacillus
- Species: A. alkalinitrilicus

Binomial name
- Alkalihalobacillus alkalinitrilicus (Sorokin et al. 2009) Patel and Gupta 2020

Type strain
- ANL-iso4

Synonyms
- Bacillus alkalinitrilicus

Species of bacterium

Alkalihalobacillus alkalinitrilicus is a bacterium of the genus Alkalihalobacillus.
