= Alkalihalobacillus akibai =

Scientific classification
- Domain: Bacteria
- Kingdom: Bacillati
- Phylum: Bacillota
- Class: Bacilli
- Order: Bacillales
- Family: Bacillaceae
- Genus: Alkalihalobacillus
- Species: A. akibai

Binomial name
- Alkalihalobacillus akibai (Nogi et al. 2005) Patel and Gupta 2020

Type strain
- 1139

Synonyms
- Bacillus akibai

Species of bacterium

Alkalihalobacillus akibai is a bacterium from the genus of Alkalihalobacillus which has been isolated from soil.
