= Alkalihalobacillus hemicentroti =

Scientific classification
- Domain: Bacteria
- Kingdom: Bacillati
- Phylum: Bacillota
- Class: Bacilli
- Order: Bacillales
- Family: Bacillaceae
- Genus: Alkalihalobacillus
- Species: A. hemicentroti

Binomial name
- Alkalihalobacillus hemicentroti (Chen et al. 2011) Patel and Gupta 2020

Type strain
- JSM 076093

Synonyms
- Alkalihalobacillus haemicentroti; Bacillus hemicentroti; Pseudalkalibacillus hemicentroti

Species of bacterium

Alkalihalobacillus hemicentroti is a Gram-positive, moderately halophilic, facultatively alkaliphilic, endospore-forming, facultatively anaerobic and non-motile bacterium from the genus of Alkalihalobacillus which has been isolated from a sea urchin (Hemicentrotus pulcherrimus) from the Naozhou Island.
