= Muricauda lutaonensis =

Scientific classification
- Domain: Bacteria
- Kingdom: Pseudomonadati
- Phylum: Bacteroidota
- Class: Flavobacteriia
- Order: Flavobacteriales
- Family: Flavobacteriaceae
- Genus: Muricauda
- Species: M. lutaonensis

Binomial name
- Muricauda lutaonensis Arun et al. 2009

Type strain
- BCRC 17850, CC-HSB-11, KCTC 22339

Species of bacterium

Muricauda lutaonensis is a Gram-negative, aerobic, rod-shaped moderately thermophilic and non-motile bacterium of the genus Muricauda which has been isolated from a hot spring on Green Island off the coast of Taiwan. The strain CC-HSB-11 of Muricauda lutaonensis produces zeaxanthin.
