= Alkalihalobacillus alcalophilus =

Scientific classification
- Domain: Bacteria
- Kingdom: Bacillati
- Phylum: Bacillota
- Class: Bacilli
- Order: Caryophanales
- Family: Bacillaceae
- Genus: Alkalihalobacillus
- Species: A. alcalophilus

Binomial name
- Alkalihalobacillus alcalophilus (Vedder, 1934) Patel & Gupta 2020

Species of bacterium

Alkalihalobacillus alcalophilus (formerly Bacillus alcalophilus) is a Gram-positive, rod-shaped species of bacteria. Likely strains of this species have been isolated from highly alkaline waste water. A. alcalophilus is a moderate halotolerant obligate alkaliphile growing at 40 °C and at pH 9–10.5 (and possibly higher) that has been isolated from soil and animal manures.

This species was transferred into the genus Alkalihalobacillus in 2020 after a phylogenomic study to resolve the polyphyly of the genus Bacillus.

== Genome ==
A draft genome of A. alcalophilus strain AV1934 has 4,348,660 bp, with 3,745 predicted proteins. The G+C content of the genome is 37.2%. Another draft genome has 4,095 predicted genes and 4,063 predicted proteins.
