= Acidihalobacter =

Scientific classification
- Domain: Bacteria
- Kingdom: Pseudomonadati
- Phylum: Pseudomonadota
- Class: Gammaproteobacteria
- Order: Chromatiales
- Family: Ectothiorhodospiraceae
- Genus: Acidihalobacter; Pablo et al. 2015

Type species
- Acidihalobacter prosperus

Species
- A. prosperus A. ferrooxidans

Genus of bacteria

Acidihalobacter is a genus of gram-negative bacteria from the family of Ectothiorhodospiraceae.'
