= Inmirania =

Scientific classification
- Domain: Bacteria
- Kingdom: Pseudomonadati
- Phylum: Pseudomonadota
- Class: Gammaproteobacteria
- Order: Chromatiales
- Family: Ectothiorhodospiraceae
- Genus: Inmirania; Slobodkina et al. 2016

Type species
- Inmirania thermothiophila

Species
- I. thermothiophila

Genus of bacteria

Inmirania is a thermophilic and facultatively autotrophic genus of bacteria from the family of Ectothiorhodospiraceae with one known species (Inmirania thermothiophila). Inmirania thermothiophila has been isolated from water and sediments from a thermal spring from the Kuril Islands.
