= Alkalihalobacillus algicola =

Scientific classification
- Domain: Bacteria
- Kingdom: Bacillati
- Phylum: Bacillota
- Class: Bacilli
- Order: Bacillales
- Family: Bacillaceae
- Genus: Alkalihalobacillus
- Species: A. algicola

Binomial name
- Alkalihalobacillus algicola (Ivanova et al. 2004) Patel and Gupta 2020

Type strain
- KMM 3737

Synonyms
- Bacillus algicola

Species of bacterium

Alkalihalobacillus algicola is a Gram-positive, spore-forming, aerobic and motile bacterium from the genus of Alkalihalobacillus which has been isolated from the alga Fucus evanescens.
