= Thiohalospira =

Scientific classification
- Domain: Bacteria
- Kingdom: Pseudomonadati
- Phylum: Pseudomonadota
- Class: Gammaproteobacteria
- Order: Chromatiales
- Family: Ectothiorhodospiraceae
- Genus: Thiohalospira; Sorokin et al. 2008

Type species
- Thiohalospira halophila

Species
- T. alkaliphila T. halophila

Genus of bacteria

Thiohalospira is an obligately chemolithoautotrophic genus of gram-negative bacteria from the family of Ectothiorhodospiraceae.
