= Alkalihalobacillus rhizosphaerae =

Scientific classification
- Domain: Bacteria
- Kingdom: Bacillati
- Phylum: Bacillota
- Class: Bacilli
- Order: Bacillales
- Family: Bacillaceae
- Genus: Alkalihalobacillus
- Species: A. rhizosphaerae

Binomial name
- Alkalihalobacillus rhizosphaerae (Madhaiyan et al. 2013) Patel and Gupta 2020

Type strain
- SC-N012

Synonyms
- Bacillus rhizosphaerae

Species of bacterium

Shouchella Clausii formerly referred to as Alkalihalobacillus rhizosphaerae, before it was renamed in 2022 by the science community, is a Gram-positive, diazotrophic and rod-shaped bacterium from the genus of Alkalihalobacillus which has been isolated from rhizospheric soil.

== Taxonomy ==
Shouchella clausii was originally described within the genus Bacillus and later placed in Alkalihalobacillus. Large-scale phylogenomic analyses published in 2022 showed that many species historically grouped under Bacillus formed several unrelated lineages. As a result, the species was reassigned to the newly established genus Shouchella, reflecting clearer evolutionary relationships among alkaliphilic members of the family Bacillaceae.

== Biomedical research ==
Studies have shown that certain strains of Shouchella clausii are capable of producing biologically synthesized silver nanoparticles. When tested in combination with salinomycin, these nanoparticles increased apoptotic and autophagic activity in human ovarian cancer cell cultures, indicating potential for future therapeutic development.

Prospective clinical studies in adults have reported that supplementation with Bacillus clausii (now classified as Shouchella clausii) may help reduce the duration and severity of acute diarrhea. A Phase II trial involving 27 adults found significant improvements across multiple clinical measures, including reduced duration of diarrhea, decreased frequency of defecation, less abdominal pain, and improved stool consistency, with no notable safety concerns. These findings suggest that S. clausii may be effective and well tolerated as a supportive therapy for acute diarrheal illness.
