= Alkalihalobacillus xiaoxiensis =

Scientific classification
- Domain: Bacteria
- Kingdom: Bacillati
- Phylum: Bacillota
- Class: Bacilli
- Order: Bacillales
- Family: Bacillaceae
- Genus: Alkalihalobacillus
- Species: A. xiaoxiensis

Binomial name
- Alkalihalobacillus xiaoxiensis (Chen et al. 2011) Patel and Gupta 2020

Type strain
- JSM 081004

Synonyms
- Bacillus xiaoxiensis

Species of bacterium

Alkalihalobacillus xiaoxiensis is a Gram-positive, slightly halophilic, endospore-forming, facultatively anaerobic, rod-shaped and motile bacterium from the genus of Alkalihalobacillus which has been isolated from forest soil from the Xiaoxi National Natural Reserve in China.
