= Alkalihalobacillus trypoxylicola =

Scientific classification
- Domain: Bacteria
- Kingdom: Bacillati
- Phylum: Bacillota
- Class: Bacilli
- Order: Bacillales
- Family: Bacillaceae
- Genus: Alkalihalobacillus
- Species: A. trypoxylicola

Binomial name
- Alkalihalobacillus trypoxylicola (Aizawa et al. 2010) Patel and Gupta 2020

Type strain
- SU1

Synonyms
- Bacillus trypoxylicola

Species of bacterium

Alkalihalobacillus trypoxylicola is a bacterium from the genus Alkalihalobacillus which has been isolated from the gut of a larva beetle (Trypoxylus dichotomus septentrionalis).
