= Albimonas =

Scientific classification
- Domain: Bacteria
- Kingdom: Pseudomonadati
- Phylum: Pseudomonadota
- Class: Alphaproteobacteria
- Order: Rhodobacterales
- Family: Rhodobacteraceae
- Genus: Albimonas; Lim et al. 2008

Type species
- A. donghaensis

Genus of bacteria

Albimonas is a genus in the phylum Pseudomonadota (Bacteria).

== Etymology ==
The name Albimonas derives from:
Latin adjective albus, white; Greek feminine gender noun monas (μονάς), monad, unit; Neo-Latin feminine gender noun Albimonas, white monad.

Members of the genus Albimonas can be referred to as albimonads (viz. Trivialisation of names).

== Species ==
The genus contains a single species, namely A. donghaensis ( Lim et al. 2008, (Type species of the genus).; Neo-Latin feminine gender adjective donghaensis, belonging to Donghae, where the organism was isolated.)

== See also ==
- Bacterial taxonomy
- Microbiology
