= Carnimonas =

Scientific classification
- Domain: Bacteria
- Kingdom: Pseudomonadati
- Phylum: Pseudomonadota
- Class: Gammaproteobacteria
- Order: Oceanospirillales
- Family: Halomonadaceae
- Genus: Carnimonas; Garriga et al. 1998

Type species
- C. nigrificans

Genus of bacteria

Carnimonas is a genus in the phylum Pseudomonadota (Bacteria).

== Etymology ==
The name Carnimonas derives from:

Latin noun caro carnis, flesh, meat; Latin feminine gender noun monas (μονάς), nominally meaning "a unit", but in effect meaning a bacterium; Neo-Latin feminine gender noun Carnimonas, a monad of meat.

Members of the genus Carnimonas can be referred to as carnimonad (viz. Trivialisation of names).

== Species ==
The genus contains a single species, namely C. nigrificans ( Garriga et al. 1998, (Type species of the genus).;: Latin participle adjective nigrificans, making black.)

== See also ==
- Bacterial taxonomy
- Microbiology
