= Alkalihalobacillus lonarensis =

Scientific classification
- Domain: Bacteria
- Kingdom: Bacillati
- Phylum: Bacillota
- Class: Bacilli
- Order: Bacillales
- Family: Bacillaceae
- Genus: Alkalihalobacillus
- Species: A. lonarensis

Binomial name
- Alkalihalobacillus lonarensis (Reddy et al. 2015) Patel and Gupta 2020

Type strain
- 25nlg

Synonyms
- Bacillus lonarensis

Species of bacterium

Alkalihalobacillus lonarensis is a Gram-positive, alkalitolerant, endospore-forming, rod-shaped and motile bacterium from the genus Alkalihalobacillus which has been isolated from the Lonar Lake.
