= Alkalihalobacillus hwajinpoensis =

Scientific classification
- Domain: Bacteria
- Kingdom: Bacillati
- Phylum: Bacillota
- Class: Bacilli
- Order: Bacillales
- Family: Bacillaceae
- Genus: Alkalihalobacillus
- Species: A. hwajinpoensis

Binomial name
- Alkalihalobacillus hwajinpoensis (Yoon et al. 2004) Patel and Gupta 2020

Type strain
- SW-93

Synonyms
- Bacillus hwajinpoensis

Species of bacterium

Alkalihalobacillus hwajinpoensis is a bacterium from the genus Alkalihalobacillus.
