= Alkalihalobacillus okhensis =

Scientific classification
- Domain: Bacteria
- Kingdom: Bacillati
- Phylum: Bacillota
- Class: Bacilli
- Order: Bacillales
- Family: Bacillaceae
- Genus: Alkalihalobacillus
- Species: A. okhensis

Binomial name
- Alkalihalobacillus okhensis (Nowlan et al. 2006) Patel and Gupta 2020

Type strain
- Kh10-101

Synonyms Bacillus okhensis
- Bacillus indiensis

Species of bacterium

Alkalihalobacillus okhensis is a strictly aerobic and rod-shaped bacterium from the genus Alkalihalobacillus.
