= Allobacillus =

Scientific classification
- Domain: Bacteria
- Kingdom: Bacillati
- Phylum: Bacillota
- Class: Bacilli
- Order: Bacillales
- Family: Bacillaceae
- Genus: Allobacillus; Sheu et al. 2011

Type species
- Allobacillus halotolerans Sheu et al. 2011

Species
- Allobacillus halotolerans; Allobacillus salarius; Allobacillus saliphilus

Genus of bacteria

Allobacillus is a Gram-positive and aerobic genus of bacteria from the family Bacillaceae. Allobacillus halotolerans has been isolated from shrimp paste.

== Phylogeny ==
The currently accepted taxonomy is based on the List of Prokaryotic names with Standing in Nomenclature (LPSN) and National Center for Biotechnology Information (NCBI).

16S rRNA based LTP_10_2024

- - - Allobacillus
      - A. halotolerans
      - A. salarius
  - - - Allobacillus saliphilus
      - Halalkalibacillus
    - other

120 marker proteins based GTDB 09-RS220

- Allobacillus
  - A. halotolerans Sheu et al. 2011
  - - A. salarius Yiamsombut et al. 2022
    - A. saliphilus Yiamsombut et al. 2022
