= Alkalihalobacillus miscanthi =

Scientific classification
- Domain: Bacteria
- Kingdom: Bacillati
- Phylum: Bacillota
- Class: Bacilli
- Order: Bacillales
- Family: Bacillaceae
- Genus: Alkalihalobacillus
- Species: A. miscanthi

Binomial name
- Alkalihalobacillus miscanthi (Shin et al. 2020) Gupta et al. 2020

Type strain
- AK13

Synonyms
- Bacillus miscanthi

Species of bacterium

Alkalihalobacillus miscanthi is a Gram-positive, aerobic, endospore-forming and rod-shaped bacterium from the genus Alkalihalobacillus which has been isolated from the rhizosphere of the grass Miscanthus sacchariflorus.
