= Alkalihalobacillus alkalilacus =

Scientific classification
- Domain: Bacteria
- Kingdom: Bacillati
- Phylum: Bacillota
- Class: Bacilli
- Order: Bacillales
- Family: Bacillaceae
- Genus: Alkalihalobacillus
- Species: A. alkalilacus

Binomial name
- Alkalihalobacillus alkalilacus (Singh et al. 2018) Gupta et al. 2020

Type strain
- AK73

Synonyms
- Bacillus alkalilacus

Species of bacterium

Alkalihalobacillus alkalilacus is a Gram-positive, endospore-forming, aerobic, rod-shaped and motile bacterium from the genus of Alkalihalobacillus which has been isolated from sediments from the Sambhar Lake in Jaipur.
