= Muricauda beolgyonensis =

Scientific classification
- Domain: Bacteria
- Kingdom: Pseudomonadati
- Phylum: Bacteroidota
- Class: Flavobacteriia
- Order: Flavobacteriales
- Family: Flavobacteriaceae
- Genus: Muricauda
- Species: M. beolgyonensis

Binomial name
- Muricauda beolgyonensis Lee et al. 2012

Type strain
- BB-My12, CCUG 60800, KCTC 23501

Species of bacterium

Muricauda beolgyonensis is a Gram-negative, rod-shaped and non-motile bacterium from the genus of Muricauda which has been isolated from tidal flat in Korea.
