= Muricauda aquimarina =

Scientific classification
- Domain: Bacteria
- Kingdom: Pseudomonadati
- Phylum: Bacteroidota
- Class: Flavobacteriia
- Order: Flavobacteriales
- Family: Flavobacteriaceae
- Genus: Muricauda
- Species: M. aquimarina

Binomial name
- Muricauda aquimarina Yoon et al. 2005

Type strain
- CIP 108790, JCM 11811, KCCM 41646, SW-63

Species of bacterium

Muricauda aquimarina is a Gram-negative, non-spore-forming and slightly halophilic bacterium from the genus of Muricauda. which has been isolated from a salt lake near the beach of Hwajinpo in Korea.
