= Alkalimonas =

Scientific classification
- Domain: Bacteria
- Kingdom: Pseudomonadati
- Phylum: Pseudomonadota
- Class: Gammaproteobacteria
- Order: incertae sedis
- Family: incertae sedis
- Genus: Alkalimonas; Ma et al. 2007

Type species
- Alkalimonas amylolytica Ma et al. 2007

Genus of bacteria

Alkalimonas is a genus of bacteria in the phylum Pseudomonadota.

== Etymology ==
The name Alkalimonas derives from:

Neo-Latin noun alkali (from Arabic al-qaliy), ashes of salt wort; Greek feminine gender noun monas (μονάς), nominally meaning "a unit", but in effect meaning a bacterium; Neo-Latin feminine gender noun Alkalimonas, alkaline monad.

Members of the genus Alkalimonas can be referred to as alkalimonads (viz. Trivialisation of names).

== Species ==
The genus contains 3 species (including basonyms and synonyms), namely

- Alkalimonas amylolytica ( Ma et al. 2007, (Type species of the genus).;: Greek noun amulon, starch; Neo-Latin adjective lyticus -a -um (from Greek adjective lutikos (λυτικός) -ē -on), able to loose, able to dissolve; Neo-Latin feminine gender adjective amylolytica, starch dissolving.)
- Alkalimonas collagenimarina ( Kurata et al. 2007; Neo-Latin noun collagenum, collagen; Latin adjective marinus -a -um, of the sea, marine; Neo-Latin feminine gender adjective collagenimarina, collagenolytic bacterium isolated from the sea.)
- Alkalimonas delamerensis ( Ma et al. 2007; Neo-Latin feminine gender adjective delamerensis, pertaining to Delamere estates, which include Lake Elmenteita (the source of the type strain), Kenya.)
