= Eilatimonas =

Scientific classification
- Domain: Bacteria
- Kingdom: Pseudomonadati
- Phylum: Pseudomonadota
- Class: Alphaproteobacteria
- Order: Kordiimonadales
- Family: Temperatibacteraceae
- Genus: Eilatimonas; Paramasivam et al. 2013
- Species: E. milleporae

Binomial name
- Eilatimonas milleporae Paramasivam et al. 2013

Genus of bacteria

Eilatimonas is a Gram-negative, rod-shaped and motile genus of bacteria from the family Temperatibacteraceae, with one known species (Eilatimonas milleporae). Eilatimonas milleporae has been isolated from the hydrocoral Millepora dichotoma from the Gulf of Aqaba in the Middle East.
