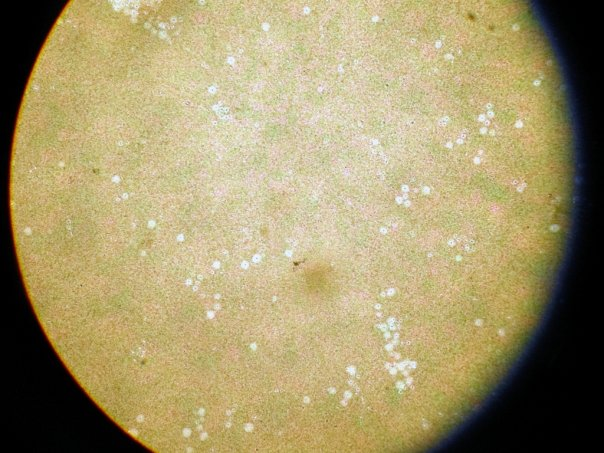
- Azomonas under 100x oil immersion

Scientific classification
- Domain: Bacteria
- Kingdom: Pseudomonadati
- Phylum: Pseudomonadota
- Class: Gammaproteobacteria
- Order: Pseudomonadales
- Family: Pseudomonadaceae
- Genus: Azomonas; Winogradsky 1938

Species
- Azomonas agilis Azomonas insignis Azomonas macrocytogenes

= Azomonas =

Genus of bacteria

Azomonas species are typically motile, oval to spherical, and secrete large quantities of capsular slime. They are distinguished from Azotobacter by their inability to form cysts, but like Azotobacter, they can biologically fix nitrogen under aerobic conditions (diazotrophs).

Bacteria of the genus Azomonas are known to form intracellular inclusions of polyhydroxyalkanoates under certain environmental conditions (e.g. lack of elements such as phosphorus, nitrogen, or oxygen combined with an excessive supply of carbon sources).

== Etymology ==
The name Azomonas derives from:

New Latin noun azotum [from Fr. noun azote (from Greek prep. ά, a, not; Greek noun ζωή, zōē, life; Greek noun άζωη, azōē, not sustaining life)], nitrogen; New Latin azo-, pertaining to nitrogen; Latin monas (μονάς), nominally meaning "a unit", but in effect meaning a bacterium; New Latin Azomonas, nitrogen monad.

Members of the genus Azomonas can be referred to as azomonads (viz. Trivialisation of names).
