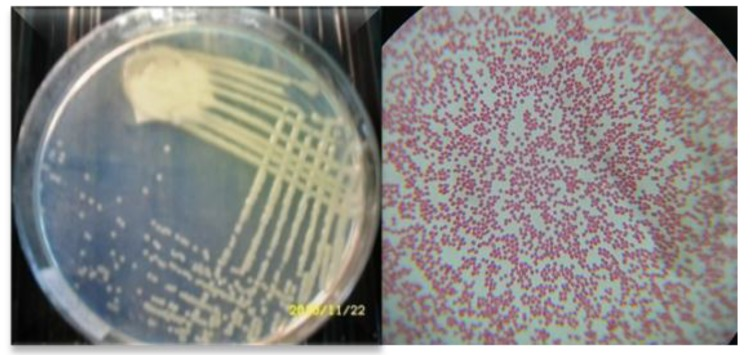
- Colonial morphology (left) and microscopic morphology (x100; right)

Scientific classification
- Domain: Bacteria
- Kingdom: Pseudomonadati
- Phylum: Pseudomonadota
- Class: Gammaproteobacteria
- Order: Pseudomonadales
- Family: Pseudomonadaceae
- Genus: Azomonas
- Species: A. agilis

Binomial name
- Azomonas agilis (Beijerinck 1901); Winogradsky 1938

= Azomonas agilis =

Species of bacterium

Azomonas agilis is a species of motile, Gram-negative bacteria found in water and is capable of fixing atmospheric nitrogen. It is the type strain for the genus Azomonas.

A. agilis resembles protists with its ovoid, ellipsoidal, or coccoid cells. The cells are relatively large, usually 2.5–6.4 μm long and 2.0–2.8 μm wide, though giant cells that are 10.0–13.5 μm have been described. The cells have peritrichous flagella which enable motility. The species also produces a diffusible yellow-green or red-violet pigment which fluoresces bluish-white under ultraviolet light.

A. agilis was first isolated and described by Martinus Beijerinck in 1901, who obtained the species from Dutch canal water in Delft. Beijernick's original strain has been lost, so the strain isolated by Albert Kluyver and van den Bout is now the neotype. Despite the fact that mannitol was used by Beijerinck in his enrichment medium for A. agilis, the bacteria in pure culture cannot use it as a carbon source unless it is first degraded by other microbes.

The species can tolerate salt concentrations up to 1.0% and is resistant to iodoacetate (1 μM) which suggests it may have ability to live in contaminated waters with relatively high concentrations of organic matter and mineral salts. This bacterium has also been implicated in the bioremediation of cadmium-polluted water.
