= Alkalihalobacillus hemicellulosilyticus =

Scientific classification
- Domain: Bacteria
- Kingdom: Bacillati
- Phylum: Bacillota
- Class: Bacilli
- Order: Bacillales
- Family: Bacillaceae
- Genus: Alkalihalobacillus
- Species: A. hemicellulosilyticus

Binomial name
- Alkalihalobacillus hemicellulosilyticus (Nogi et al. 2005) Patel and Gupta 2020

Type strain
- C-11

Synonyms
- Alkalihalobacillus haemicellulosilyticus; Bacillus hemicellulosilyticus; Halalkalibacter hemicellulosilyticus

Species of bacterium

Alkalihalobacillus hemicellulosilyticus is a bacterium from the genus of Alkalihalobacillus.
