= Alkalihalobacillus patagoniensis =

Scientific classification
- Domain: Bacteria
- Kingdom: Bacillati
- Phylum: Bacillota
- Class: Bacilli
- Order: Bacillales
- Family: Bacillaceae
- Genus: Alkalihalobacillus
- Species: A. patagoniensis

Binomial name
- Alkalihalobacillus patagoniensis (Olivera et al. 2005) Patel and Gupta 2020

Type strain
- PAT 05

Synonyms
- Bacillus patagoniensis

Species of bacterium

Alkalihalobacillus patagoniensis is a Gram-positive, rod-shaped and spore-forming bacterium from the genus Alkalihalobacillus which has been isolated from the rhizosphere of the plant Atriplex lampa from Patagonia.
