= Muricauda flavescens =

Scientific classification
- Domain: Bacteria
- Kingdom: Pseudomonadati
- Phylum: Bacteroidota
- Class: Flavobacteriia
- Order: Flavobacteriales
- Family: Flavobacteriaceae
- Genus: Muricauda
- Species: M. flavescens

Binomial name
- Muricauda flavescens Yoon et al. 2005

Type strain
- JCM 11812, KCCM 41645, SW-62

Species of bacterium

Muricauda flavescens is a Gram-negative, non-spore-forming and slightly halophilic bacterium from the genus of Muricauda which has been isolated from a salt lake near the beach of Hwajinpo in Korea.
