= Oceanococcus =

Scientific classification
- Domain: Bacteria
- Kingdom: Pseudomonadati
- Phylum: Pseudomonadota
- Class: Gammaproteobacteria
- Order: Chromatiales
- Family: Ectothiorhodospiraceae
- Genus: Oceanococcus; Li et al. 2014

Type species
- Oceanococcus atlanticus

Species
- O. atlanticus

Synonyms
- Maricoccus

Genus of bacteria

Oceanococcus is a Gram-negative genus of bacteria from the family of Ectothiorhodospiraceae with one known species (Oceanococcus atlanticus). Oceanococcus atlanticus has been isolated from deep sea sediments from the Atlantic Ocean.
