= Muricauda olearia =

Scientific classification
- Domain: Bacteria
- Kingdom: Pseudomonadati
- Phylum: Bacteroidota
- Class: Flavobacteriia
- Order: Flavobacteriales
- Family: Flavobacteriaceae
- Genus: Muricauda
- Species: M. olearia

Binomial name
- Muricauda olearia Hwang et al. 2009

Type strain
- JCM 15563, KCCM 90075, CL-SS4

Synonyms
- Muricauda litorea

Species of bacterium

Muricauda olearia is a Gram-negative, rod-shaped and non-motile bacterium from the genus of Muricauda which has been isolated from seawater which was contaminated with crude oil from the west coast of Korea.
