= Thiogranum =

Scientific classification
- Domain: Bacteria
- Kingdom: Pseudomonadati
- Phylum: Pseudomonadota
- Class: Gammaproteobacteria
- Order: Chromatiales
- Family: Ectothiorhodospiraceae
- Genus: Thiogranum; Mori et al. 2015

Type species
- Thiogranum longum

Species
- T. longum

Genus of bacteria

Thiogranum is an obligately chemolithoautotrophic genus of bacteria from the family of Ectothiorhodospiraceae with one known species (Thiogranum longum). Thiogranum longum has been isolated from a rock from a deep-sea hydrothermal field from the coast of Suiyo Seamount in Japan.
