= Halofilum =

Scientific classification
- Domain: Bacteria
- Kingdom: Pseudomonadati
- Phylum: Pseudomonadota
- Class: Gammaproteobacteria
- Order: Chromatiales
- Family: Ectothiorhodospiraceae
- Genus: Halofilum; Xia et al. 2017

Type species
- Halofilum ochraceum

Genus of bacteria

Halofilum is a Gram-negative and facultative anaerobic genus of bacteria from the family of Ectothiorhodospiraceae with one known species (Halofilum ochraceum). Halofilum ochraceum has been isolated from a marine solar saltern from the coast of Weihai in China.
