= Halorhodospira =

Scientific classification
- Domain: Bacteria
- Kingdom: Pseudomonadati
- Phylum: Pseudomonadota
- Class: Gammaproteobacteria
- Order: Chromatiales
- Family: Ectothiorhodospiraceae
- Genus: Halorhodospira; Imhoff and Süling 1997

Type species
- Halorhodospira halophila

Species
- H. abdelmalekii H. halochloris H. halophila H. neutriphila

Genus of bacteria

Halorhodospira is a Gram-negative genus of bacteria from the family of Ectothiorhodospiraceae. Halorhodospira bacteria occur in hypersaline and extreme saline habitats.
