= Alkalihalobacillus hunanensis =

Scientific classification
- Domain: Bacteria
- Kingdom: Bacillati
- Phylum: Bacillota
- Class: Bacilli
- Order: Bacillales
- Family: Bacillaceae
- Genus: Alkalihalobacillus
- Species: A. hunanensis

Binomial name
- Alkalihalobacillus hunanensis Patel and Gupta 2020

Type strain
- JSM 081003

Synonyms
- Bacillus hunanensis

Species of bacterium

Alkalihalobacillus hunanensis is a Gram-positive, rod-shaped, slightly halophilic, aerobic, endospore-forming and motile bacterium from the genus of Alkalihalobacillus which has been isolated from forest soil from Hunan.
