= Muricauda lutimaris =

Scientific classification
- Domain: Bacteria
- Kingdom: Pseudomonadati
- Phylum: Bacteroidota
- Class: Flavobacteriia
- Order: Flavobacteriales
- Family: Flavobacteriaceae
- Genus: Muricauda
- Species: M. lutimaris

Binomial name
- Muricauda lutimaris Yoon et al. 2008

Type strain
- CCUG 55324, KCTC 22173, SMK-108

Species of bacterium

Muricauda lutimaris is a Gram-negative, rod-shaped and non-motile bacterium from the genus of Muricauda which has been isolated from tidal flat from the Yellow Sea in Korea.
