= Sediminimonas =

Scientific classification
- Domain: Bacteria
- Kingdom: Pseudomonadati
- Phylum: Pseudomonadota
- Class: Alphaproteobacteria
- Order: Rhodobacterales
- Family: Rhodobacteraceae
- Genus: Sediminimonas; Wang et al. 2009

Type species
- Sediminimonas qiaohouensis

Species
- S. qiaohouensis

Genus of bacteria

Sediminimonas is a Gram-negative, non-spore-forming and non-motile genus of bacteria from the family of Rhodobacteraceae with one known species (Sediminimonas qiaohouensis). Sediminimonas qiaohouensis has been isolated from sediments from a salt mine in Yunnan in China.
