= Methylohalomonas =

Scientific classification
- Domain: Bacteria
- Kingdom: Pseudomonadati
- Phylum: Pseudomonadota
- Class: Gammaproteobacteria
- Order: Chromatiales
- Family: Ectothiorhodospiraceae
- Genus: Methylohalomonas; Sorokin et al. 2007

Type species
- Methylohalomonas lacus

Species
- M. lacus

Genus of bacteria

Methylohalomonas is a moderately halophilic and obligately methylotrophic genus of purple sulfur bacteria with one known species (Methylohalomonas lacus). Methylohalomonas lacus has been isolated from hypersaline lakes from the Kulunda Steppe in Russia.
