= Lutimonas =

Scientific classification
- Domain: Bacteria
- Kingdom: Pseudomonadati
- Phylum: Bacteroidota
- Class: Flavobacteriia
- Order: Flavobacteriales
- Family: Flavobacteriaceae
- Genus: Lutimonas; Yang et al. 2007

Species
- Lutimonas halocynthiae Kim et al. 2014; Lutimonas saemankumensis (Yoon et al. 2008) Kim et al. 2014; Lutimonas vermicola Yang et al. 2007

Synonyms
- Aestuariicola Yoon et al. 2008

Genus of bacteria

Lutimonas is a genus in the phylum Bacteroidota (Bacteria).
