= Muricauda =

Scientific classification
- Domain: Bacteria
- Kingdom: Pseudomonadati
- Phylum: Bacteroidota
- Class: Flavobacteriia
- Order: Flavobacteriales
- Family: Flavobacteriaceae
- Genus: Muricauda; Bruns et al. 2001

Type species
- Muricauda ruestringensis Bruns et al. 2001

Species
- See text.

Synonyms
- Caudamuris; Flagellimonas Bae et al. 2007; Spongiibacterium Yoon and Oh 2012

Genus of bacteria

Muricauda is a genus of gram-negative bacteria in the phylum Bacteroidota.

== Species ==
The genus Maribacter comprises the following species:

- Muricauda aequoris Guo et al. 2020
- Muricauda alvinocaridis Liu et al. 2020
- Muricauda amoyensis Li et al. 2019
- Muricauda amphidinii Chen et al. 2021
- Muricauda aquimarina Yoon et al. 2005
- Muricauda beolgyonensis Lee et al. 2012
- Muricauda eckloniae (Bae et al. 2007) García-López et al. 2020
- Muricauda flava (Yoon and Oh 2012) García-López et al. 2020
- Muricauda flavescens Yoon et al. 2005
- Muricauda hadalis Zhang et al. 2020
- Muricauda hymeniacidonis Park 2019
- Muricauda indica Zhang et al. 2018
- Muricauda iocasae Liu et al. 2018
- Muricauda koreensis García-López et al. 2020
- Muricauda lutaonensis Arun et al. 2009
- Muricauda lutimaris Yoon et al. 2008
- Muricauda marina Su et al. 2017
- Muricauda maritima Guo et al. 2020
- Muricauda nanhaiensis Dang et al. 2019
- Muricauda oceanensis Guo et al. 2020
- Muricauda oceani Dong et al. 2020
- Muricauda ochracea Kim et al. 2020
- Muricauda olearia Hwang et al. 2009
- Muricauda pacifica Zhang et al. 2015
- Muricauda ruestringensis Bruns et al. 2001
- Muricauda sediminis Zhu et al. 2021
- Muricauda taeanensis Kim et al. 2013
- Muricauda zhangzhouensis Yang et al. 2013
