= Marixanthomonas =

Scientific classification
- Domain: Bacteria
- Kingdom: Pseudomonadati
- Phylum: Bacteroidota
- Class: Flavobacteriia
- Order: Flavobacteriales
- Family: Flavobacteriaceae
- Genus: Marixanthomonas; Romanenko et al. 2007

Species
- M. ophiurae

Bacterium

Marixanthomonas is a Gram-negative, aerobic and non-motile genus of bacteria from the family of Flavobacteriaceae with one known species (Marixanthomonas ophiurae).
