= Citreimonas =

Scientific classification
- Domain: Bacteria
- Kingdom: Pseudomonadati
- Phylum: Pseudomonadota
- Class: Alphaproteobacteria
- Order: Rhodobacterales
- Family: Rhodobacteraceae
- Genus: Citreimonas; Choi and Cho 2006

Type species
- Citreimonas salinaria

Species
- C. salinaria

Genus of bacteria

Citreimonas is a genus of bacteria from the family of Rhodobacteraceae with one known species (Citreimonas salinaria). Citreimonas salinaria has been isolated from hypersaline water from a solar saltern in Seosin in Korea.
