= Aquisalimonas =

Scientific classification
- Domain: Bacteria
- Kingdom: Pseudomonadati
- Phylum: Pseudomonadota
- Class: Gammaproteobacteria
- Order: Chromatiales
- Family: Ectothiorhodospiraceae
- Genus: Aquisalimonas; Márquez et al. 2007

Type species
- Aquisalimonas asiatica

Species
- Aquisalimonas asiatica Aquisalimonas halophila Aquisalimonas lutea

Synonyms
- Aquasalina

Genus of bacteria

Aquisalimonas is a Gram-negative, non-endospore-forming, moderately halophilic, alkalitolerant and motile genus of bacteria from the family of Ectothiorhodospiraceae.
