= Tranquillimonas =

Scientific classification
- Domain: Bacteria
- Kingdom: Pseudomonadati
- Phylum: Pseudomonadota
- Class: Alphaproteobacteria
- Order: Rhodobacterales
- Family: Rhodobacteraceae
- Genus: Tranquillimonas; Harwati et al. 2008

Type species
- Tranquillimonas alkanivorans

Species
- T. alkanivorans

Genus of bacteria

Tranquillimonas is a Gram-negative, obligately halophilic, rod-shaped and non-motile genus of bacteria from the family of Rhodobacteraceae with one known species (Tranquillimonas alkanivorans). Tranquillimonas alkanivorans has been isolated from seawater from the Semarang Port in Indonesia.
