= Mushroom compost =

Compost used in the growing of mushrooms

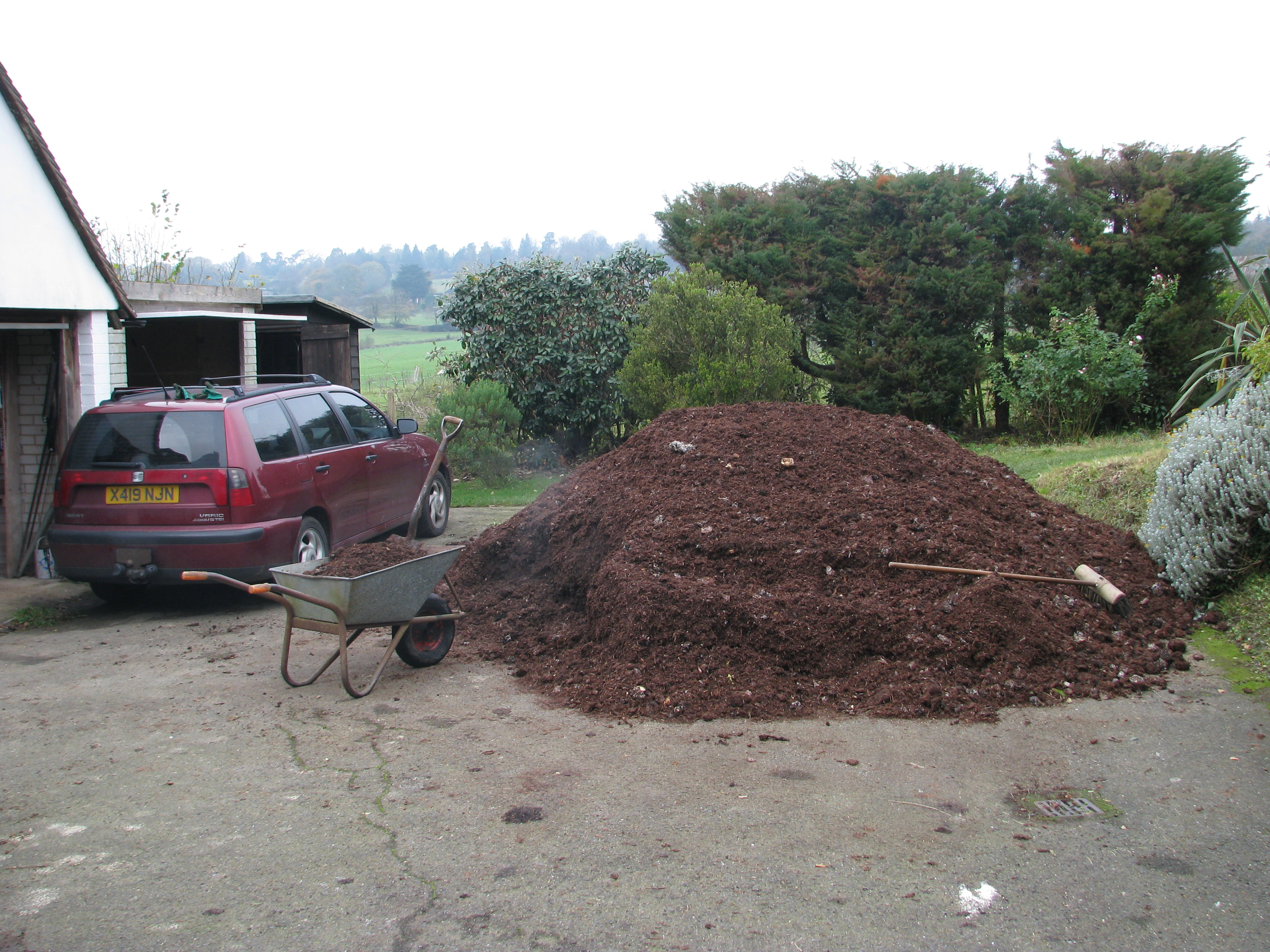
A heap of mushroom compost

Mushroom compost (also called mushroom soil or mushroom culture substrate) is used in mushroom production industry. Mushrooms are cultivated in this substrate under controlled climatic conditions. The substrate primarily serves as a moisture reservoir.

It is readily available (bagged, at nursery suppliers), and its formulation generally consists of a combination of wheat straw, dried blood, horse manure and ground chalk, composted together. Each ton of horse manure contains an average of:

- 340 kg Dry matter
- 200 kg Organic matter
- 45 kg Calcium
- 6,9 kg Nitrogen
- 4,1 kg Phosphate
- 9 kg Potassium
- 2,5 kg Magnesium

== Spent Mushroom Compost (SMC) ==
In the mushroom production industry, at the end of the production cycle, the growing medium is no longer useful for producing more mushrooms. What many consider waste, so-called spent mushroom compost (SMC), still contains organic matter, nutrients, and an active microbial community.

It is an excellent source of humus, although much of its nitrogen content will have been used up by the composting and growing mushrooms. It remains, however, a good source of general nutrients (1-2% N, 0.2% P, 1.3% K plus a full range of trace elements), as well as a useful soil conditioner. However, due to its chalk content, it may be alkaline, and should not be used on acid-loving plants, nor should it be applied too frequently, as it will overly raise the soil's pH levels.

Mushroom compost may also contain pesticide residues, particularly organochlorides used against the fungus gnat. If the compost pile was stored outside, it may contain grubs or other insects attracted to decaying matter. Chemicals may also have been used to treat the straw, and also to sterilize the compost. Therefore, the organic gardener must be careful regarding the sourcing of mushroom compost; if in doubt, samples can be analyzed for contamination – in the UK, the Department for Environment, Food and Rural Affairs is able to advise regarding this issue.

Commercially available 'spent' mushroom compost is not always truly spent. It is sold by mushroom farms when it is no longer producing commercially viable yields of mushrooms. It can be used to grow further smaller crops of mushrooms before final use on the garden.
