= Arhodomonas =

Scientific classification
- Domain: Bacteria
- Kingdom: Pseudomonadati
- Phylum: Pseudomonadota
- Class: Gammaproteobacteria
- Order: Chromatiales
- Family: Ectothiorhodospiraceae
- Genus: Arhodomonas; Adkins, et al. 1993

Species
- Arhodomonas aquaeolei; Arhodomonas recens

Genus of bacteria

Arhodomonas is a genus of gram-negative bacteria. Arhodomonas species are rod-shaped bacteria, approximately 1 micrometer wide and 2.5 micrometers long. They use a single flagellum at one end of the cell to move. Metabolically, Arhodomonas species are pure chemotrophs, and can grow on various simple organic compounds but not on most carbohydrates.
