= Thiohalomonas =

Scientific classification
- Domain: Bacteria
- Kingdom: Pseudomonadati
- Phylum: Pseudomonadota
- Class: Gammaproteobacteria
- Order: Chromatiales
- Family: Ectothiorhodospiraceae
- Genus: Thiohalomonas; Sorokin et al. 2007

Type species
- Thiohalomonas denitrificans

Species
- T. denitrificans T. nitratireducens

Genus of bacteria

Thiohalomonas is a moderately halophilic and obligately chemolithoautotrophic genus of purple sulfur bacteria.
