= Maritimimonas =

Scientific classification
- Domain: Bacteria
- Kingdom: Pseudomonadati
- Phylum: Bacteroidota
- Class: Flavobacteriia
- Order: Flavobacteriales
- Family: Flavobacteriaceae
- Genus: Maritimimonas; Park et al. 2009

Type species
- Maritimimonas rapanae

Species
- M. rapanae

Genus of bacteria

Maritimimonas is a Gram-negative and aerobic genus of bacteria from the family of Flavobacteriaceae with one known species (Maritimimonas rapanae). Maritimimonas rapanae has been isolated from the gut of the whelk Rapana venosa from the South Sea in Korea. M. rapanae requires sea salt for growth and is unable to grow in media supplemented with sodium chloride alone. M. rapanae is positive for catalase and oxidase production.
