= Temperatibacteraceae =

Scientific classification
- Domain: Bacteria
- Kingdom: Pseudomonadati
- Phylum: Pseudomonadota
- Class: Alphaproteobacteria
- Order: Kordiimonadales; Kwon et al. 2005
- Family: Temperatibacteraceae; Teramoto and Nishijima 2014

Genera
- Eilatimonas Paramasivam et al. 2013; Kordiimonas Kwon et al. 2005; Temperatibacter Teramoto and Nishijima 2014

Synonyms
- Kordiimonadaceae Xu et al. 2020

Family of bacteria

Temperatibacteraceae is a family of bacteria.
