= Ectothiorhodospiraceae =

Scientific classification
- Domain: Bacteria
- Kingdom: Pseudomonadati
- Phylum: Pseudomonadota
- Class: Gammaproteobacteria
- Order: Chromatiales
- Family: Ectothiorhodospiraceae; Imhoff 1984

Genera
- Acidihalobacter Cárdenas et al. 2015; Alkalilimnicola corrig. Yakimov et al. 2001; "Alkalispirillum" Rijkenberg et al. 2001; Aquisalimonas Márquez et al. 2007; Arhodomonas Adkins et al. 1993; Ectothiorhodosinus Gorlenko et al. 2007; Ectothiorhodospira Pelsh 1936 (Approved Lists 1980); "Ca. Endonucleariibacter" corrig. Dirren et al. 2014; Halofilum Xia et al. 2017; Halorhodospira Imhoff and Süling 1997; Inmirania Slobodkina et al. 2016; "Maricoccus" Li et al. 2013; Methylohalomonas Sorokin et al. 2007; Methylonatrum Sorokin et al. 2007; Natronocella Sorokin et al. 2007; Natronospira Sorokin et al. 2017; Nitrococcus Watson and Waterbury 1971 (Approved Lists 1980); Oceanococcus Li et al. 2014; "Ca. Ovatusbacter" Dirren and Posch 2016; Spiribacter León et al. 2014; Thioalbus Park et al. 2011; Thioalkalivibrio corrig. Sorokin et al. 2001; Thiogranum Mori et al. 2015; Thiohalomonas Sorokin et al. 2007; Thiohalospira Sorokin et al. 2008; Thiorhodospira Bryantseva et al. 1999

Family of bacteria

The Ectothiorhodospiraceae are a family of purple sulfur bacteria, distinguished by producing sulfur globules outside of their cells. The cells are rod-shaped, vibrioid, or spirilla, and they are able to move using flagella. In general, they are marine and prefer anaerobic conditions. Ectothiorhodospiraceae are a vibrio bacteria that require salty living conditions to survive and grow: classifying them as slightly halophilic. Like all purple sulfur bacteria, they are capable of photosynthesis. To complete this energy process, Sulfur compounds are used as electron donors for carbon fixation in the pentose phosphate pathway. This elemental sulfur accumulates outside of the cells.

Ectothiorhodospiraceae mobilis table of characteristics

Test Type	Test	Characteristics
Colony Characteristics	Size	0.7-1.0μm
Morphological Character	Shape	short spiral/ bent rod
Morphological Character	Gram	-
Physiological Character	Motility	+
Physiological Character	NaCl optimum %	2-3
Physiological Character	pH optimum	7.6-8.0
Acid Produced From	Hydrogen	+
Acid Produced From	Sulfide	+
Acid Produced From	Lactate	+/-
Acid Produced From	Acetate	+
Acid Produced From	Malate	+
Acid Produced From	Succinate	+
Acid Produced From	Ethanol	-
Acid Produced From	Propanol	-

Note: + = positive, - = negative
