= Alkaliphile =

Microbes capable of survival in alkaline environments

Alkaliphiles are a class of extremophilic microbes capable of survival in alkaline (pH roughly 8.5–11) environments, growing optimally around a pH of 10. These bacteria can be further categorized as obligate alkaliphiles (those that require high pH to survive), facultative alkaliphiles (those able to survive in high pH, but also grow under normal conditions) and haloalkaliphiles (those that require high salt content to survive).

== Background information ==
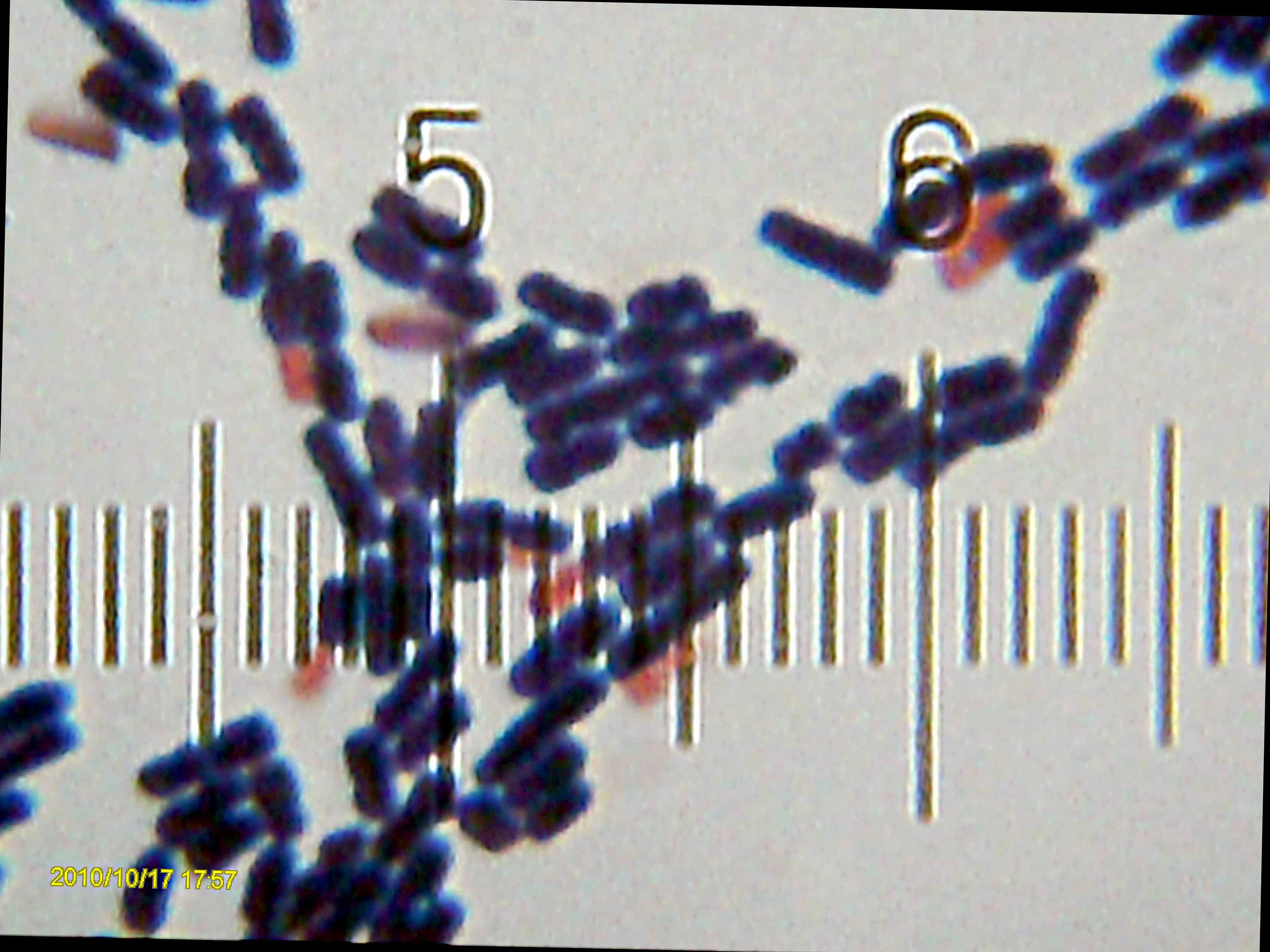
A typical bacillus culture. Many alkaliphiles possess a bacillus morphology.

Microbial growth in alkaline conditions presents several complications to normal biochemical activity and reproduction, as high pH is detrimental to normal cellular processes. For example, alkalinity can lead to denaturation of DNA, instability of the plasma membrane and inactivation of cytosolic enzymes, as well as other unfavorable physiological changes. Thus, to adequately circumvent these obstacles, alkaliphiles must either possess specific cellular machinery that works best in the alkaline range, or they must have methods of acidifying the cytosol in relation to the extracellular environment. To determine which of the above possibilities an alkaliphile uses, experimentation has demonstrated that alkaliphilic enzymes possess relatively normal pH optimums. The determination that these enzymes function most efficiently near physiologically neutral pH ranges (about 7.5–8.5) was one of the primary steps in elucidating how alkaliphiles survive intensely basic environments. Since the cytosolic pH must remain nearly neutral, alkaliphiles must have one or more mechanisms of acidifying the cytosol when in the presence of a highly alkaline environment.

== Mechanisms of cytosolic acidification ==
Alkaliphiles maintain cytosolic acidification through both passive and active means. In passive acidification, it has been proposed that cell walls contain acidic polymers composed of residues such as galacturonic acid, gluconic acid, glutamic acid, aspartic acid, and phosphoric acid. Together, these residues form an acidic matrix that helps protect the plasma membrane from alkaline conditions by preventing the entry of hydroxide ions, and allowing for the uptake of sodium and hydronium ions. In addition, the peptidoglycan in alkaliphilic B. subtilis has been observed to contain higher levels of hexosamines and amino acids as compared to its neutrophilic counterpart. When alkaliphiles lose these acidic residues in the form of induced mutations, it has been shown that their ability to grow in alkaline conditions is severely hindered. However, it is generally agreed upon that passive methods of cytosolic acidification are not sufficient to maintain an internal pH 2-2.3 levels below that of external pH; there must also be active forms of acidification. The most characterized method of active acidification is in the form of Na^{+}/H^{+} antiporters. In this model, H^{+} ions are first extruded through the electron transport chain in respiring cells and to some extent through an ATPase in fermentative cells. This proton extrusion establishes a proton gradient that drives electrogenic antiporters—which drive intracellular Na^{+} out of the cell in exchange for a greater number of H^{+} ions, leading to the net accumulation of internal protons. This proton accumulation leads to a lowering of cytosolic pH. The expelled Na^{+} can be used for solute symport, which are necessary for cellular processes. It has been noted that Na^{+}/H^{+} antiport is required for alkaliphilic growth, whereas either K^{+}/H^{+} antiporters or Na^{+}/H^{+} antiporters can be utilized by neutrophilic bacteria. If Na^{+}/H^{+} antiporters are disabled through mutation or another means, the bacteria are rendered neutrophilic. The sodium required for this antiport system is the reason some alkaliphiles can only grow in saline environments.

== Habitats ==
Alkaliphiles are found in a diverse range of environments across the Earth. Their primary and most extensively studied habitats are naturally occurring alkaline niches. These include soda lakes (such as those in the East African Rift Valley, the western United States, and Central Asia), which are characterized by high levels of sodium carbonates and can reach pH values above 11. Other natural habitats include carbonate-rich alkaline soils, serpentinizing hydrothermal vents that produce alkaline fluids, and even ordinary garden soil, where transient alkaline conditions can be generated by biological activity.

=== Anthropogenic habitats ===
Recent research has expanded the known habitats of alkaliphiles to include anthropogenic alkaline niches, such as common household products (e.g., soap, detergent, baking soda). A 2026 study isolated over 80 distinct alkalitolerant bacterial strains from these sources, many of which produced alkaline-active proteases and amylases.

== Differences in alkaliphilic ATP production ==
In addition to the method of proton extrusion discussed above, it is believed that the general method of cellular respiration is different in obligate alkaliphiles as compared to neutrophiles. Generally, ATP production operates by establishing a proton gradient (greater H+ concentration outside the membrane) and a transmembrane electrical potential (with a positive charge outside the membrane). However, since alkaliphiles have a reversed pH gradient, it would seem that ATP production—which is based on a strong proton-motive force – would be severely reduced. However, the opposite is true. It has been proposed that while the pH gradient has been reversed, the transmembrane electrical potential is greatly increased. This increase in charge causes the production of greater amounts of ATP by each translocated proton when driven through an ATPase. Research in this area is ongoing.

== Applications and future research ==
Alkaliphiles promise several interesting uses for biotechnology and future research. Alkaliphilic methods of regulating pH and producing ATP are of interest in the scientific community. However, perhaps the greatest area of interest from alkaliphiles lies in their enzymes: alkaline proteases; starch-degrading enzymes; cellulases; lipases; xylanases; pectinases; chitinases and their metabolites, including: 2-phenylamine; carotenoids; siderophores; cholic acid derivatives and organic acids. It is hoped that further research into alkaliphilic enzymes will allow scientists to harvest alkaliphiles' enzymes for use in basic conditions. Research aimed at discovering alkaliphile-produced antibiotics showed some success, yet has been held at bay by the fact that some products produced at high pH are unstable and unusable at a physiological pH range.

== Examples ==
Examples of alkaliphiles include Halorhodospira halochloris, Natronomonas pharaonis, and Thiohalospira alkaliphila.

== See also ==
- Acidophile
- Acidophobe
- Extremophile
- Neutrophile
