= Aidingensis =

Aidingensis may refer to:

- Alkalibacillus aidingensis, species of bacteria
- Prauserella aidingensis, species of bacteria
- Salinibacillus aidingensis, species of bacteria
- Streptomyces aidingensis, species of bacteria
- Terribacillus aidingensis, species of bacteria
