= Plastisphere =

Plastic debris suspended in water and organisms which live in it

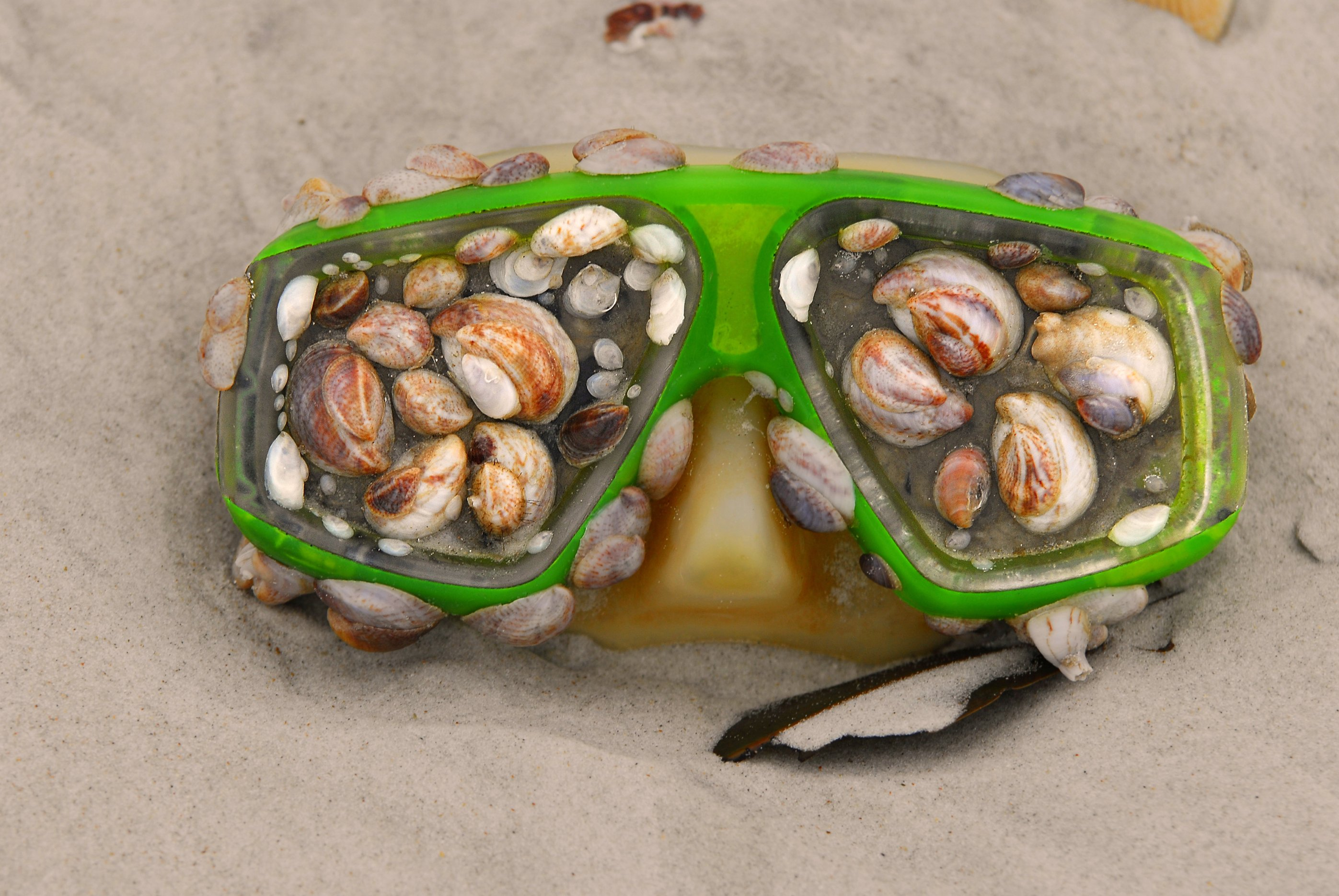
A colony of limpets attached to a diving mask, found washed ashore on a beach

The plastisphere is a human-made ecosystem consisting of organisms able to live on plastic waste. Plastic marine debris, most notably microplastics, accumulates in aquatic environments and serves as a habitat for various types of microorganisms, including bacteria and fungi. As of 2022, an estimated 51 trillion microplastics are floating in the surface water of the world's oceans. A single 5mm piece of plastic can host thousands of different microbial species. Some marine bacteria can break down plastic polymers and use the carbon as a source of energy.

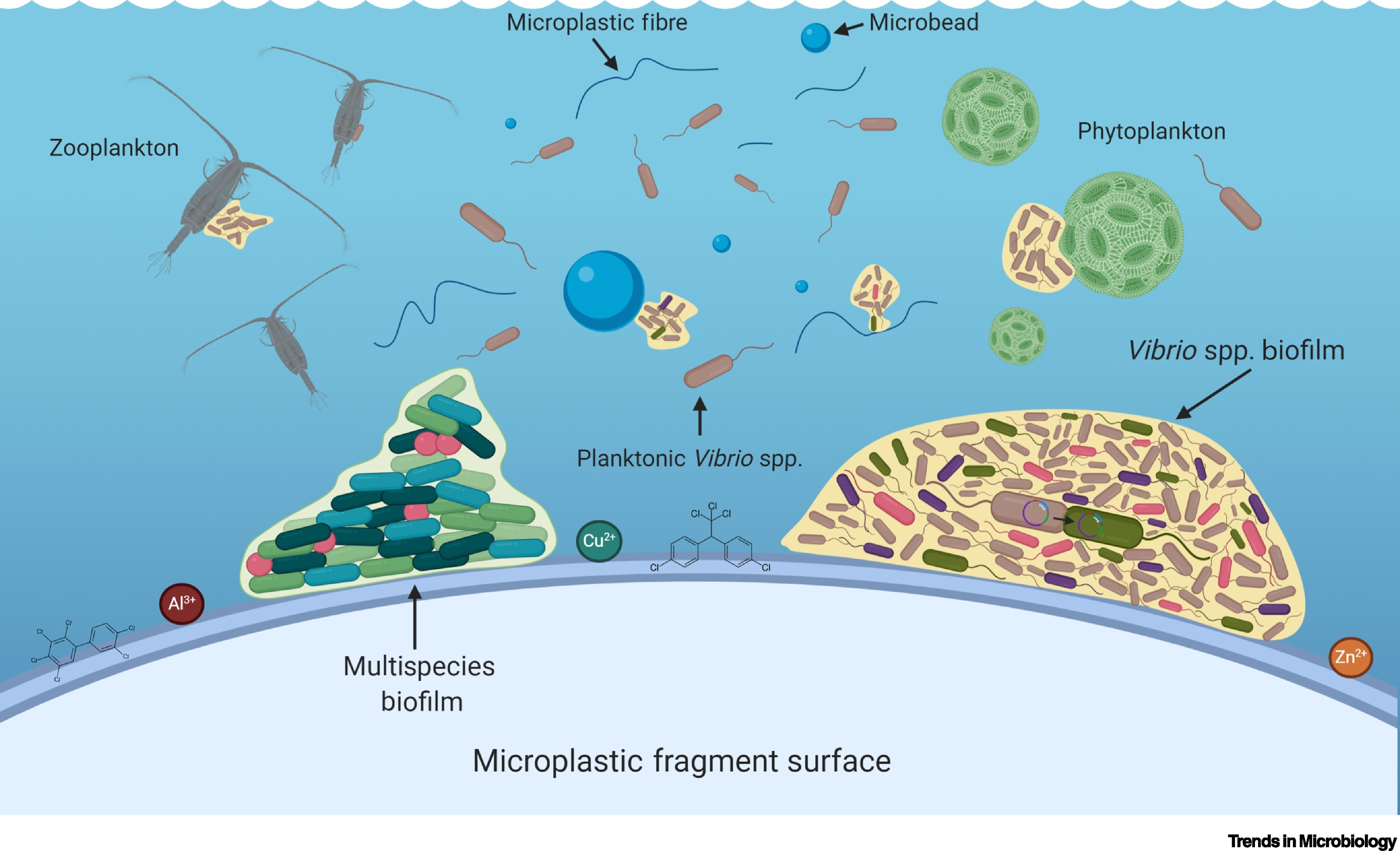
Microbes interacting with the surface of plastics.

Plastic pollution acts as a more durable "ship" than biodegradable material for carrying the organisms over long distances. This long-distance transportation can move microbes to different ecosystems and potentially introduce invasive species as well as harmful algae. The microorganisms found on the plastic debris comprise an entire ecosystem of autotrophs, heterotrophs and symbionts. The microbial species found within plastisphere differ from other floating materials that naturally occur (i.e., feathers and algae) due to plastics' unique chemical nature and slow speed of biodegradation. In addition to microbes, insects have come to flourish in areas of the ocean that were previously uninhabitable. The sea skater, for example, has been able to reproduce on the hard surface provided by the floating plastic.

== History ==
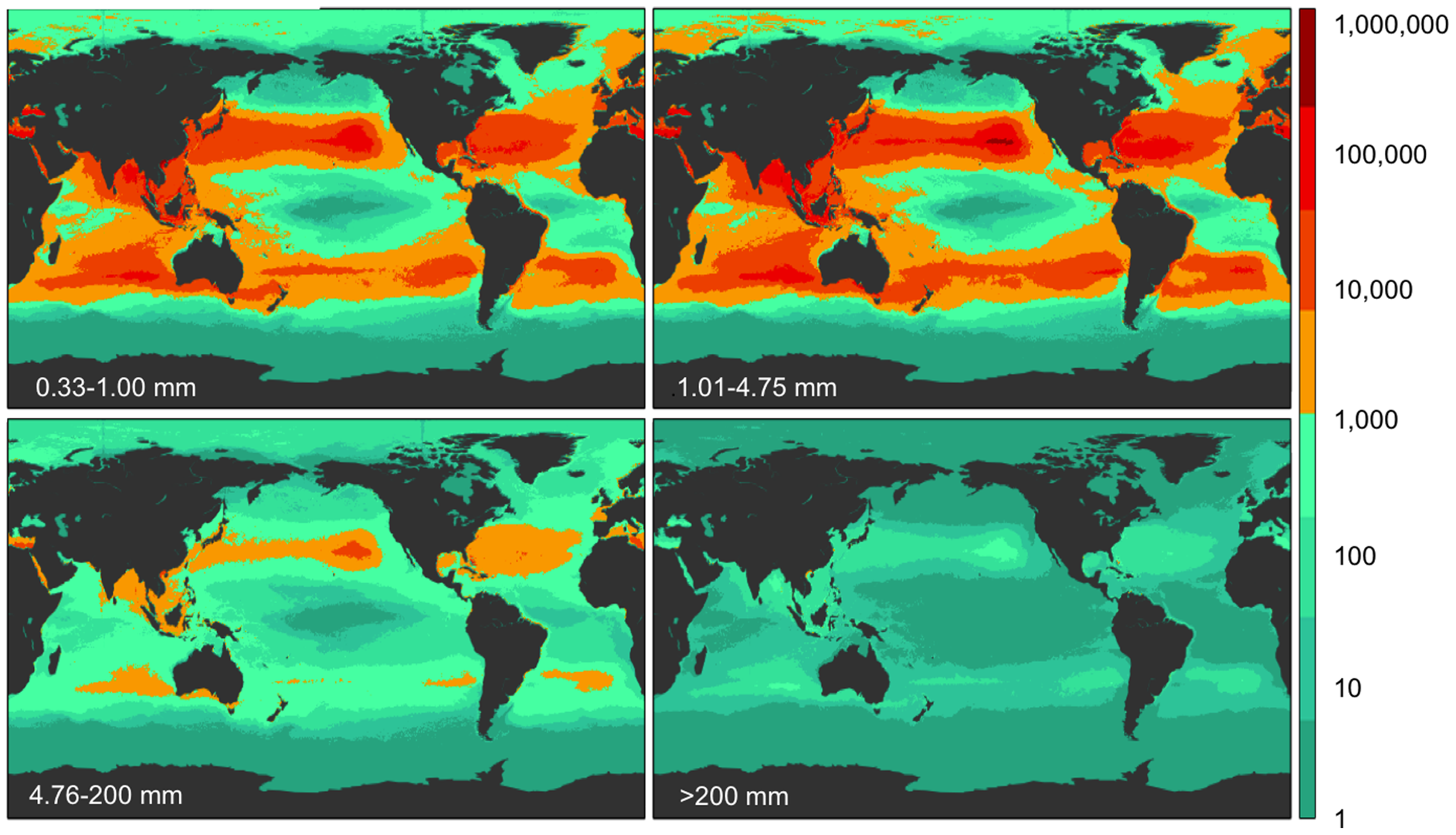
Global distribution of microplastics according to size in millimeters.

=== Discovery ===
The plastisphere was first described in 2013 by a team of three marine scientists, Linda Amaral-Zettler from the Marine Biological Laboratory, Tracy Mincer from Woods Hole Oceanographic Institution, and Erik Zettler from Sea Education Association. They collected plastic samples during research trips to study how the microorganisms function and alter the ecosystem. They analyzed plastic fragments collected in nets from multiple locations within the Atlantic Ocean. The researchers used a combination of scanning electron microscopy and DNA sequencing to identify the distinct microbial community composition of the plastisphere. Among the most notable findings were "pit formers", crack and pit forming organisms that provide evidence of biodegradation and may also have the potential to break down hydrocarbons. In their analysis, the researchers also found members of the genus Vibrio, a genus which includes the bacteria that cause cholera and other gastrointestinal ailments. Some species of Vibrio can glow, and it is hypothesized that this attracts fish that eat the organisms colonizing the plastic, which then feed from the stomachs of the fish. Studies carried out in the Baltic Sea and in the Mediterranean Sea, also found microorganisms of the genus Vibrio, in plastic films and fragments, and in plastic fibres, respectively.

UN assessment of marine plastics litter

=== Anthropogenic sources ===
Plastic was invented in 1907 by Leo Baekeland using formaldehyde and phenol. Since then, plastic use has exploded and is prevalent throughout human society. From 1964 to 2014, the use of plastic increased twenty-fold. It is expected to double from the 2014 levels by 2035. Efforts to curb plastic production through plastic bans have largely focused on packaging and single-use plastics, but have not slowed the pace of plastic pollution. Similarly, plastic recycling rates tend to be low. In the EU, only 29% of the plastic consumed is recycled. Plastic that does not reach a recycling facility or landfill, accumulates in marine environments due to accidental dumping of the waste, losses during transport, or direct disposal from ships. In 2010, it was estimated that 4 to 12 million metric tons (Mt) of plastic waste entered into marine ecosystems.

Smaller, more inconspicuous microplastic particles have aggregated in the oceans since the 1960s. A more recent concern in microplastic pollution is the use of plastic films in agriculture. 7.4 million tons of plastic film are used each year to increase food production. Scientists have found that microbial biofilms can form within 7–14 days on plastic film surfaces, and have the ability to alter the chemical properties of the soil and plants that we are ingesting. Microplastics have been recorded everywhere, even the Arctic due to atmospheric circulation.

== Research ==
=== Diversity ===
Large-scale sequencing studies have found alpha diversities to be lower in the plastisphere relative to surrounding soil samples due to a decrease in species richness in the plastisphere. Polymer film fragments affect microbes in different ways, leading to mixed effects on microbial growth rates in the plastisphere. Certain polymer degrading bacteria release toxic byproducts as a result of the degradation, serving as a deterrent to the colonization of the plastisphere by other species. Phylogenetic diversity is also decreased in the plastisphere relative to nearby soil samples.

The bacterial and microbial communities in the plastisphere are significantly different from those found in surrounding soil samples, creating a new ecological niche within the ecosystem. The specific growth of bacteria caused by film fragments is a primary cause for the creation of a unique bacterial community. Changes in bacterial community composition over time in the plastisphere have also been shown to drive changes in surrounding land.

In another study which looked at the factors influencing the diversity of the plastisphere, the researchers found that the highest degree of unique microorganisms tended to favor plastic pieces that were blue.

A 2024 paper described an experiment carried out across the Atlantic Ocean and the Mediterranean Sea aimed at studying the colonisation and genetic variety of organisms in the marine plastisphere. The paper identified tardigrades incubating in plastics in situ.

=== Taxonomy ===
The ability of certain bacteria to degrade polymers facilitates their flourishing within the plastisphere. Phyla of bacteria that have increased presences in the plastisphere relative to soil samples without plastic micro-fragments include Acidobacteria, Actinobacteria, Bacteroidetes, Chloroflexi, Firmicutes, Planctomycetes, and Proteobacteria. Furthermore, bacteria of the order Rhizobiales, Rhodobacterales, and Sphingomonadales are enriched in the plastisphere. Interactions within the unique bacterial community composition in the plastisphere influence local biogeochemical cycles and ecosystems' food web interactions.

=== Community metabolism ===
Bacterial communities in the plastisphere have enhanced metabolisms. KEGG Pathway enrichment analyses of plastisphere samples have demonstrated increases in genetic and environmental information processing, cellular processes, and organismal systems. Enhanced metabolic functions for communities in the plastisphere include nitrogen metabolism, insulin signaling pathways, bacterial secretion, organophosphorus compound metabolism, antioxidant metabolism, Vitamin B synthesis, chemotaxis, terpenoid quinone synthesis, sulfur metabolism, carbohydrate metabolism, herbicide degradation, fatty acid metabolism, amino acid metabolism, ketone body pathways, lipopolysaccharide synthesis, alcohol degradation, polycyclic aromatic hydrocarbon degradation, lipid metabolism, cofactor metabolism, cellular growth, cell motility, membrane transport, energy metabolism, and xenobiotics metabolism.

=== Relationship to biogeochemical cycles ===
The presence of hydrocarbon-degrading species such as hydrocarbonoclastic bacteria in the plastisphere indicates a direct link between the plastisphere and the carbon cycle.

Metagenome analyses suggest that genes involved in carbon degradation, nitrogen fixation, organic nitrogen conversion, ammonia oxidation, denitrification, inorganic phosphorus solubilization, organic phosphorus mineralization, and phosphorus transporter production are enriched in the plastisphere, demonstrating the potential impact on biogeochemical cycles by the plastisphere. Specific bacterial phyla present in the plastisphere due to their biodegradation abilities and their role in the carbon, nitrogen, and phosphorus cycles include Proteobacteria and Bacteroidetes. Some carbon-degrading bacteria are able to use plastics as a food source.

Research in the southern Pacific Ocean has investigated the plastisphere's potential in CO_{2} and N_{2}O contribution where fairly low greenhouse gas contributions by the plastisphere were noted. However, it was concluded that greenhouse gas contribution was dependent on the degree of nutrient concentration and the type of plastic.

=== Significance to human health ===
KEGG Pathway enrichment analyses of plastisphere samples suggest that sequences related to human disease are enriched in the plastisphere. Cholera causing Vibrio cholerae, cancer pathways, and toxoplasmosis sequences are enriched in the plastisphere. Pathogenic bacteria are sustained in the plastisphere in part due to the adsorption of organic pollutants onto biofilms and their usage as nutrition. Current research also aims to identify the relationship between the plastisphere and respiratory viruses and whether the plastisphere affects viral persistence and survival in the environment.

=== Degradation by microorganisms ===
Some microorganisms present in the plastisphere have the potential to degrade plastic materials. This could be potentially advantageous, as scientists may be able to utilize the microbes to break down plastic that would otherwise remain in the environment for centuries. However, as plastic is broken down into smaller pieces and eventually microplastics, there is a higher likelihood that it will be consumed by plankton and enter into the food chain. As plankton are eaten by larger organisms, the plastic may eventually cause there to be bioaccumulation in fish and other marine species eaten by humans. The following table lists some microorganisms with biodegradation capacity.

Microorganisms and their biodegradation capacity
Microorganism	Plastic type	Degradation capacity
Aspergillus tubingensis	Polyurethane	Degraded 90% within 21 days
Pestalotiopsis microspora	Polyurethane	Degraded 90% within 16 days
Bacillus pseudofirmus	LDPE	Degraded 8.3% over 90 day observation period
Salipaludibacillus agaradhaerens	LDPE	Degraded 18.3 ± 0.3% (with iron oxide nanoparticles added as a supplement) and 13.7 ± 0.5% (without the nanoparticles) after 60 days of incubation
Tenebrio molitor larvae	Polystyrene (PS)	Degradation rates doubled for meal worms with diets that consisted of 10% PS and 90% bran in comparison to meal worms who were exclusively fed PS
Enterobacter sp.	Polystyrene (PS)	Degraded a maximum of 12.4% in 30 days
Phanerochaete chrysosporium	Polycarbonate	Degraded 5.4% in 12 months
Marine microbial consortium	Polycarbonate	Degraded 8.3% in 12 months
Ideonella sakaiensis	PET	Fully degraded within six weeks
Activated sludge	PET	Degraded up to 60% within a year
Galleria mellonella caterpillars	Polyethylene	Degraded 13% within 14 hours Average degradation rate of 0.23 mg cm-2 h-1
Zalerium maritimum	Polyethylene	Degraded 70% within 21 days

Oftentimes the degradation process of plastic by microorganisms is quite slow. However, scientists have been working towards genetically modifying these organisms in order to increase plastic biodegradation potential. For instance, Ideonella sakaiensis has been genetically modified to break down PET at faster rates. Multiple chemical and physical pretreatments have also demonstrated potential in enhancing the degree of biodegradation of different polymers. For instance UV or c-ray irradiation treatments, have been used to heighten the degree of biodegradation of certain plastics.

Recent work by Li et al. (2023) has continued this effort via the novel approach by combining the PET-degradation capabilities of Ideonella sakaiensis with the saltwater affinity characteristics of Vibrio natriegens. The laboratory work of Li et al. (2023) was able to take DNA from I. sakaiensis and insert it into V. natriegens. This process allowed V. natriegens to create enzymes that can break down PET plastic in a saltwater environment. While this work was strictly laboratory based and at room temperatures, it signifies progress in the effort to develop microorganisms that can decompose micro- and nano-plastics that would otherwise accumulate in terrestrial and ocean environments.

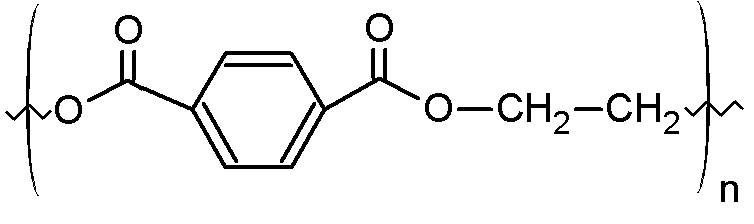
PET

== See also ==
- Plastivore
- North Pacific Gyre
- Garbage patch
- Plastic pollution
