= C22H30O5 =

The molecular formula C_{22}H_{30}O_{5} (molar mass: 374.47 g/mol, exact mass: 374.2093 u) may refer to:

- Etiprednol
- Guanacastepene A
- Jasmolin II
- Methylprednisolone
- Nandrolone hydrogen succinate, or nandrolone hemisuccinate
