= Jon Clardy =

American chemist

- Born: Washington, D.C.
- Education: Yale University (B.S.), Harvard University (Ph.D.)
- Awards: Ernest Guenther Award (1995)

Jon Clardy (born May 16, 1943, Washington, D.C., United States) is currently the Hsien Wu and Daisy Yen Wu professor of biological chemistry and molecular pharmacology at Harvard Medical School. His research focuses on the isolation and structural characterization of natural products, and currently investigates the role of biologically active small molecules in mediating symbiotic interactions and disease.

== Biography ==
Clardy grew up in Arlington, Virginia, United States, the oldest of four children. He attended Yale University where he received a B.S. in 1964 and was elected to Phi Beta Kappa. While he was always captivated by biology, during college he became more interested in chemistry. He performed undergraduate research in organic synthesis, directed by R. Stephen Berry, with an emphasis on benzyne. After graduating from Yale, he moved to Harvard University, where he received a Ph.D. in chemistry in 1969. He then accepted a faculty position in the Chemistry Department at Iowa State University, where he was affiliated with the Ames Laboratory. In 1978, he moved to the Chemistry Department at Cornell University where he stayed until 2002, when he moved to the Biological Chemistry and Molecular Pharmacology Department at Harvard Medical School. In 2004, he started the Ph.D. Program in Chemical Biology with Stuart Schreiber and Greg Verdine. He also created, and continues to teach, a popular class entitled "Molecules of Life" for Harvard undergraduates who are not majoring in sciences.

While pursuing his Ph.D., Clardy met his wife Andrea Fleck, a Swarthmore College graduate, who is a writer. Her works include a children's book, two books about upstate New York, and plays that have been performed across the country. They have two sons.

== Natural product discovery ==
Clardy's early research focused on the structure elucidation of natural products primarily by X-ray crystallography. Early on at Iowa State University Clardy established important collaborations with Bill Fenical, John Faulkner and Paul Scheuer, which led to the structure elucidation of numerous marine natural products such as the anticancer agent bryostatin, the insecticidal and antifungal jaspamide, diazonamide A and B, and many others. Some of his most notable early work focused on the neurotoxins associated with "red tide" – which led to the determination of the three dimensional structures of saxitoxin, of the gonyautoxin group, and the cyclic polyether brevetoxin B. Upon moving to Cornell University, Clardy's research expanded to include a huge variety of non-marine organisms including, but not limited to, fungi, Actinomycetota and C. elegans. His longstanding interest in endophytic fungi led to the discovery of the selectively cytotoxic quinone torreyanic acid, the structurally diverse guanacastepenes, the antimycotic agent cryptocin, and many others.

Recently, Clardy has focused on symbiotic associations between bacteria and other organisms as rich sources of novel small molecules. In collaboration with Cameron Currie, Clardy investigated associations between Actinomycetes and insects such as the southern pine beetle, ants and termites that led to the discovery of antifungal agents including dentigerumycin and mycangimycin. The study of chemical exchange in complex ecological interactions remains a central focus of the Clardy lab.

== X-ray crystallography of small molecule – protein interactions ==
Clardy, in collaboration with Stuart Schreiber and colleagues, obtained the crystal structure for both the FK506/FKBP12 and rapamycin/FKBP12 complexes. Shortly thereafter Schreiber and Clardy went on to determine the structure of the FK506/rapamycin/FRAP complex – a groundbreaking study that revealed the ability of a cell-permeable small molecule to facilitate protein dimerization. Vertex, a start-up pharmaceutical company, was founded to design a nontoxic version of FK506. In collaboration with Walter Leal, Clardy and colleagues obtained an X-ray crystal structure for the volatile insect pheromone bombykol with its binding partner located on the antennae of female silkworm moths. Besides further enhancing the understanding of this highly specific small-molecule-protein interaction, this study marked the first three-dimensional structure of an odorant-binding protein.

== eDNA ==
Clardy is also known for his work in elucidating natural products made by unculturable bacteria and is credited, along with Jo Handelsman and Robert M. Goodman, for pioneering the field of metagenomics. With Sean Brady, he developed a method to insert DNA directly from environmental DNA (eDNA) like soil, into cosmid libraries, search for biosynthetic gene clusters and identify the products of these genes. Using this method they elucidated the structures of numerous antibiotics previously unattainable by traditional lab techniques, such as natural products derived from long-chain N-acyltyrosines.
