= The Andromeda Strain (miniseries) =

2008 science fiction miniseries

- Genre: Science fiction
- Based on: The Andromeda Strain by Michael Crichton
- Written by: Robert Schenkkan
- Directed by: Mikael Salomon
- Starring: Benjamin Bratt; Eric McCormack; Christa Miller; Daniel Dae Kim; Paul Perri; Viola Davis; Ricky Schroder; Andre Braugher; Eve Harlow
- Original language: English

Production
- Producers: Ridley Scott; Tony Scott; David W. Zucker; Tom Thayer; Mikael Salomon
- Cinematography: Jon Joffin
- Editor: Scott Vickrey
- Running time: 169 minutes
- Production companies: Universal Pictures; Scott Free; Traveler's Fest

Original release
- Network: A&E Network
- Release: May 26 – May 27, 2008

The Andromeda Strain is a 2008 science fiction miniseries broadcast on A&E Network. Based on the 1969 novel of the same name written by Michael Crichton, the series focuses on a team of scientists who investigate a deadly disease of extraterrestrial origin. The miniseries is a "reimagining" of the original novel rather than an adaptation. In addition to updating the setting to the early 21st century, the miniseries makes a great many plot and character changes from its source.

== Plot ==
=== Episode 1 ===
A U.S. government satellite crash lands near Piedmont, Utah, where two teenagers find it and bring it back to town. The town's inhabitants open it and release a deadly microorganism, which is later codenamed Andromeda by the U.S. Army. A team is sent from the Army's biological defense group to retrieve the satellite, only to die from the disease themselves. The video footage recorded by the retrieval team and their strange deaths capture the attention of General George Mancheck, the head of the group, who activates "Wildfire", a team of five scientists who are called upon when high-level bioterror threats occur in the United States. The team, headed by its creator, Dr. Jeremy Stone, investigates Piedmont. They retrieve the satellite and rescue a hysterical 60-year-old man and a colicky baby who have survived the Andromeda outbreak.

In an isolated underground laboratory, the Wildfire team begins their examination of the downed satellite and the two survivors. The laboratory is powered by a small water-cooled nuclear reactor. In the event of a contamination breach, a 15-minute self-destruct sequence would be automatically initiated; however, if the activated sequence is deemed unnecessary, Major Bill Keane, designated by the odd-man hypothesis, is the only person able to deactivate the sequence, using his passkey and right thumbprint.

The scientists begin their analysis of the Andromeda strain recovered from inside the satellite. They initially discover that the microorganism contains large numbers of buckyballs, and the team believes Andromeda is a product of advanced synthetic biology. The team hypothesizes that Andromeda has an extraterrestrial origin, as it has no DNA or amino acids. The team discovers Andromeda is an airborne microorganism that kills its host by entering the bloodstream through the lungs and coagulating the blood in the body, causing death within 10 seconds via a blood clot in the brain. Those who survive the blood clot become insane, extremely violent, and suicidal. It is revealed that the two survivors from Piedmont had not been affected by Andromeda because of their acidic blood. Later testing reveals the cell to be resistant to all known antibiotics.

Cable news reporter Jack Nash becomes aware of some of the events related to the fallen satellite and Andromeda. As he investigates further, Chuck Beeter, Director of the NSA, uses General Mancheck's aide, Colonel Ferrus, to perform assassinations to prevent knowledge of Andromeda from reaching the civilian population. Nash travels to one of the temporary National Guard outposts performing quarantine procedures, and witnesses the effects of Andromeda spreading through various modes of transportation. He becomes a target of assassination due to his presence at the outpost, but manages to escape from Ferrus and his subordinates.

Meanwhile, a government agency forms a conspiracy to contain the microorganism for further uses, probably weapons related. To handle the situation, General Mancheck deliberately isolates the Wildfire team and cuts their contact with the lab's exterior. Jack Nash manages to report to Dr. Stone about Project Scoop, a secret program that was hidden by the government and General Mancheck. Mancheck, forcefully questioned by Wildfire and fearing for the world's safety, reveals the truth. Project Scoop was one of several attempts to investigate a singularity, or a wormhole, that has mysteriously appeared in the Solar System. Sent specifically to collect biological samples, the satellite malfunctioned upon approaching the wormhole and fell back to Earth. When it was picked up, it released the deadly agent.

In an attempt to neutralize the problem, the President of the United States authorizes a small tactical nuclear strike on the quarantine area in hopes of completely irradiating and destroying Andromeda. When the Wildfire team is informed, they realize that they have not reviewed the test results for irradiating Andromeda. They find that the microorganism grows at an exponential rate when irradiated. The Wildfire team alerts the President, and the air strike is called off before the pilot launches the nuclear missile. However, as the fighter jet flies over the quarantine area, the pilot reports a malfunction of the aircraft's controls. Through video feed, the Wildfire team and President watch in horror as all plastic components of the aircraft, including the pilot's visor, disintegrate.

=== Episode 2 ===
The nuclear missile is rearmed, the fighter jet and missile crash into the ground, and the missile detonates, irradiating the quarantine area. The team examine the footage of the crash, and realize that Andromeda has mutated again and is now able to consume plastic as a source of carbon.

As Andromeda grows and mutates into more virulent forms, taking host in anything from mammals and reptiles to the bird population, the Wildfire team continue their tests to find a way to stop Andromeda before it reaches Las Vegas, the closest city to the quarantine zone with an international airport. Further studies reveal Andromeda is actually a sulfur-based bacterium. A set of tests with bacteriophages reveals that one phage can kill Andromeda. Repeated tests with this phage prove unsuccessful, causing the Wildfire team to theorize that Andromeda can communicate through an unknown mechanism among its separate parts. By the time they discover a binary code on Andromeda's cell wall encoded on buckyballs with potassium and rubidium atoms, the team suspects Andromeda to be a message according to the Messenger Theory. The information included the six-digit number "739528" and the words "Bacillus infernus" encoded in ASCII plus a bitmap image of a symbol with interlocking triangles. Bacillus infernus is the name of a bacterium found only in the thermal vents.

Tests with Bacillus infernus reveal that the bacterium easily consumes and destroys Andromeda because of Andromeda's sulfur structure. The Wildfire team begins to grow large amounts of the bacterium in culture vats, intending to spray the culture liquid over a quarantine area in an attempt to sanitize it of the extraterrestrial bacterium.

As the team watches the video footage of the crashed fighter jet, Dr. Stone suspects the possibility that Andromeda did not attack until the launching sequence of the nuclear warhead has been halted, suggesting that colonies of it could probably think and so attack the jet to force the warhead to be detonated, thereby accelerating their own growth. The team therefore begins to destroy the remaining samples of Andromeda in the lab in an attempt to prevent Andromeda from communicating.

As part of the conspiracy to preserve cultures of Andromeda for future use, Colonel Ferrus extorts Dr. Barton to keep a single sample container. The bacteria then disintegrate their container, setting off the lab's contamination breach sensor and initiating the self-destruct sequence. The self-destruct sequence also causes the flashing emergency lights to turn on, triggering Chou's photosensitive epilepsy, which causes him to inadvertently destroy the self-destruct control panel on the lab level of the complex.

With the elevators deactivated due to the self-destruct sequence, Keane decides to climb to the control panel on the level above through the lab's main exhaust vent. However, the pipes and other components in the vent have begun to deteriorate due to the escaped Andromeda. The pipe Keane climbs suddenly bends, dangling Keane above the radioactive water at the base of the vent. Before falling, Keane manages to throw his badge to Stone. Realizing Keane's right thumb is also required to shut down the self-destruct sequence, Chou sacrifices his life to enter the radioactive water to cut off Keane's thumb for Stone. With Keane's thumb and badge, Stone reaches the control panel and deactivates the sequences with only seconds to spare. Eventually, the dispersal of Bacillus infernus eradicates all traces of Andromeda.

As the remaining Wildfire team attends the funerals of their fallen colleagues, both General Mancheck and Colonel Ferrus are secretly assassinated. Dr. Stone reveals some of the events to the public in an interview with Jack Nash. Finally, the preserved sample of the Andromeda is inserted into a BSL-4 compartment with the access code "739528", held in a vessel marked with a symbol with interlocking triangles. Director Beeter watches over the operation on the computer in his office. Andromeda has been stored within a space station orbiting Earth.

The ending implies that the sample saved on the space station is the cause of the outbreak in the future that necessitated sending the organism back to the present via the wormhole, creating an ontological paradox as to the cell's origin. The ending also implies that Andromeda could really think, since the future outbreak of Andromeda has happened after the bacteria Bacillus infernus, the only thing capable of exterminating Andromeda, was completely destroyed, and so Andromeda avoided unnecessary risks by waiting for its right opportunity.

== Cast ==
- Benjamin Bratt as Dr. Jeremy Stone
- Eric McCormack as Jack Nash
- Christa Miller as Dr. Angela Noyce
- Daniel Dae Kim as Dr. Tsi Chou
- Viola Davis as Dr. Charlene Barton
- Ricky Schroder as Major Bill Keane, M.D.
- Andre Braugher as General George Mancheck
- Louis Ferreira as Colonel James C. Ferrus
- Paul Perri as Dr. Smithson
- Barry Flatman as Charles "Chuck" Beeter
- Ted Whittall as President Scott
- Ted Atherton as Edward "Ed" Dewitt
- Eve Harlow as Leila
- Tom McBeath as Kyle Tobler

== Development ==
=== Production ===
In September 2004, the Sci Fi Channel announced that they would produce a miniseries of The Andromeda Strain executive-produced by Ridley and Tony Scott and Frank Darabont. On May 2, 2007, the SciFi channel's news website The SciFi Wire announced that the miniseries would be broadcast on the A&E Network. The miniseries originally aired as a four-hour, two-part miniseries, airing in the UK on May 11, 2008, and with part one premiering in the U.S. on May 26 and part two on May 27, 2008. It was screened as a single, approximately three-hour movie in Australia on September 21, 2009.

=== Filming ===
On August 16, 2007, the cast and crew filmed at the Surrey, B.C. campus of Simon Fraser University. The production also filmed in the Kamloops Brewery in Kamloops, British Columbia. Exterior scenes were filmed in Hedley, British Columbia, Ashcroft, British Columbia. and the shoot location for the black helicopter was done in Savona, British Columbia. Although no filming was done in Utah, the satellite image appearing in the nuclear strike sequence is that of Emery, Utah.

=== Marketing ===
A&E created an alternate reality game that is set around a fictional blog, titled "What Happened in Piedmont?". The blog accompanies the miniseries and features references to trouble in the town in which the miniseries is set. The "author" is a journalism student at the University of California, Berkeley, and the blog discusses his attempts to contact people from his home town of Piedmont after receiving a "bizarre voicemail" from his sister that left him with "a horrible feeling inside". After the first post in April 2008, the blog revealed further insight into the plot of the miniseries, with cross-links to other fictional sites where players of the game could enter passwords to obtain more information.

The series' tagline is "It's a bad day to be human."

== Reception ==
The Andromeda Strain miniseries received mostly negative reviews from critics. The Hartford Courant called it an "entertaining piece of high-velocity intrigue." The Boston Globe found it unoriginal, although "sometimes engaging." The Los Angeles Times calls it "overwrought and dull" and criticizes its divergence from the original story. Entertainment Weekly complained about the slow pace and stated that "the cluttered remake mires itself in lab work, inane backstories, and bureaucracy." The New York Times stated that "it never grows quite suspenseful enough."

Though it did not win any, the miniseries was nominated for six Emmy Awards, including Outstanding Miniseries. Part one was nominated for its cinematography, single-camera picture editing and sound mixing. Part two was nominated for sound editing. Both parts were nominated for makeup (non-prosthetic).

The review aggregation website Rotten Tomatoes gave the series a 30% approval rating based on 30 reviews, with an average rating of 4.48/10. The site's critical consensus reads: "Infected with an overloaded plot and clunky techno-babble, The Andromeda Strain is a remarkably dull mutation of its source material."

== Ratings ==
Part one of The Andromeda Strain averaged 4.8 million total viewers, making it the second most-watched A&E program ever, behind Flight 93. Part two averaged 5 million total viewers.
