= Salirhabdus =

Scientific classification
- Domain: Bacteria
- Kingdom: Bacillati
- Phylum: Bacillota
- Class: Bacilli
- Order: Bacillales
- Family: Bacillaceae
- Genus: Salirhabdus; Albuquerque et al. 2007

Type species
- Salirhabdus euzebyi Albuquerque et al. 2007

Species
- S. euzebyi; S. salicampi

Genus of bacteria

Salirhabdus is a genus of bacteria from the family of Bacillaceae.

== Phylogeny ==
The currently accepted taxonomy is based on the List of Prokaryotic names with Standing in Nomenclature (LPSN) and National Center for Biotechnology Information (NCBI).

16S rRNA based LTP_10_2024

- - Salinibacillus
  - - - Salirhabdus
        - S. euzebyi Albuquerque et al. 2007
        - S. salicampi Lee & Whang 2017
    - other

120 marker proteins based GTDB 09-RS220

- - Salirhabdus salicampi
  - - Salirhabdus euzebyi
    - Salinibacillus

== See also ==
- List of bacterial orders
- List of bacteria genera
