= Salirhabdus euzebyi =

Scientific classification
- Domain: Bacteria
- Kingdom: Bacillati
- Phylum: Bacillota
- Class: Bacilli
- Order: Bacillales
- Family: Bacillaceae
- Genus: Salirhabdus
- Species: S. euzebyi

Binomial name
- Salirhabdus euzebyi Albuquerque et al. 2007

Type strain
- CIP 108577, CVS-14 T, DSM 19612, LMG 22839

Synonyms
- Salirhabdus caputitis

Species of bacterium

Salirhabdus euzebyi is a Gram-positive, spore-forming, aerobic, halotolerant and motile bacterium from the genus of Salipaludibacillus which has been isolated from sea salt from the island of Sal in Portugal.
