= Salirhabdus salicampi =

Scientific classification
- Domain: Bacteria
- Kingdom: Bacillati
- Phylum: Bacillota
- Class: Bacilli
- Order: Bacillales
- Family: Bacillaceae
- Genus: Salirhabdus
- Species: S. salicampi

Binomial name
- Salirhabdus salicampi Lee and Whang 2017

Type strain
- KACC 18690, NBRC 111874, BH128

Species of bacterium

Salirhabdus salicampi is a Gram-positive, halotolerant, spore-forming, aerobic and motile bacterium from the genus of Salipaludibacillus which has been isolated from soil from a saltern from the Bigeum Island in Korea.
