= Terribacillus =

Scientific classification
- Domain: Bacteria
- Kingdom: Bacillati
- Phylum: Bacillota
- Class: Bacilli
- Order: Bacillales
- Family: Bacillaceae
- Genus: Terribacillus; An et al. 2007

Type species
- Terribacillus saccharophilus An et al. 2007

Species
- T. aidingensis; T. goriensis; T. halophilus; T. saccharophilus; "T. shanxiensis"

Synonyms
- Goribacillus; Pelagibacillus Kim et al. 2007

Genus of bacteria

Terribacillus is a Gram-positive and aerobic genus of bacteria from the family of Bacillaceae.

== Phylogeny ==
The currently accepted taxonomy is based on the List of Prokaryotic names with Standing in Nomenclature (LPSN) and National Center for Biotechnology Information (NCBI).

16S rRNA based LTP_10_2024

- Terribacillus
  - T. aidingensis Liu et al. 2010
  - - T. halophilus An et al. 2007
    - - T. goriensis (Kim et al. 2007) Krishnamurthi & Chakrabarti 2009
      - T. saccharophilus An et al. 2007

120 marker proteins based GTDB 09-RS220

- Terribacillus
  - T. aidingensis
  - - T. halophilus
    - T. saccharophilus [incl. T. goriensis]

== See also ==
- List of Bacteria genera
- List of bacterial orders
