= Alkalibacillus =

Scientific classification
- Domain: Bacteria
- Kingdom: Bacillati
- Phylum: Bacillota
- Class: Bacilli
- Order: Bacillales
- Family: Alkalibacillaceae
- Genus: Alkalibacillus; Jeon et al. 2005

Type species
- Alkalibacillus haloalkaliphilus (Fritze 1996) Jeon et al. 2005

Species
- See text

Genus of bacteria

Alkalibacillus is a genus in the phylum Bacillota (Bacteria).

== Etymology ==
The name Alkalibacillus derives from:
Neo-Latin noun alkali (from Arabic article al, the; Arabic noun qaliy, ashes of saltwort), alkali; Latin masculine gender noun bacillus, rod; Neo-Latin masculine gender noun Alkalibacillus, bacillus living under alkaline conditions.

== Classification ==
The genus contains 8 species (including basonyms and synonyms), namely

- A. aidingensis Li et al. 2021
- A. almallahensis Perez-Dav et al. 2014
- A. filiformis Romano et al. 2005 (Latin noun filum, a thread; Latin suff. -formis (from Latin noun forma, figure, shape, appearance), -like, in the shape of; Neo-Latin masculine gender adjective filiformis, thread-shaped.)
- A. flavidus Yoon et al. 2010 (Latin masculine gender adjective flavidus, pale yellow.)
- A. haloalkaliphilus (Fritze 1996) Jeon et al. 2005 (Type species of the genus); (Greek noun hals, halos (ἅλς, ἁλός), salt; Neo-Latin noun alkali (from Arabic article al, the; Arabic noun qaliy, ashes of saltwort), alkali; Greek adjective φίλος loving; Neo-Latin masculine gender adjective haloalkaliphilus, loving briny)
- A. halophilus Tian et al. 2009 (Greek noun hals, halos (ἅλς, ἁλός), salt; Neo-Latin masculine gender adjective philus (from Greek masculine gender adjective φίλος), friend, loving; Neo-Latin masculine gender adjective halophilus, salt-loving.)
- A. salilacus Jeon et al. 2005 (Latin noun sal salis, salt; Latin noun lacus -us, lake; Neo-Latin genitive case noun salilacus, of a salt lake.)
- A. silvisoli Usami et al. 2007 (Latin noun silva, forest; Latin noun solum, soil; Neo-Latin genitive case noun silvisoli, of forest soil, the source of isolation of the type strain.)

=== Phylogeny ===
The currently accepted taxonomy is based on the List of Prokaryotic names with Standing in Nomenclature (LPSN) and National Center for Biotechnology Information (NCBI).

16S rRNA based LTP_10_2024

- Alkalibacillus
  - A. aidingensis Li et al. 2022
  - - - A. haloalkaliphilus (Fritze 1996) Jeon et al. 2005
      - A. filiformis Romano et al. 2005
    - - A. silvisoli Usami et al. 2007
      - - A. flavidus Yoon et al. 2010
        - - A. salilacus Jeon et al. 2005
          - - A. almallahensis Perez-Davo et al. 2014
            - A. halophilus Tian et al. 2009

120 marker proteins based GTDB 09-RS220

- Alkalibacillus
  - A. aidingensis
  - - - A. haloalkaliphilus
      - A. filiformis
    - - A. almallahensis
      - A. salilacus
