= Plastivore =

Organism capable of degrading and metabolising plastic

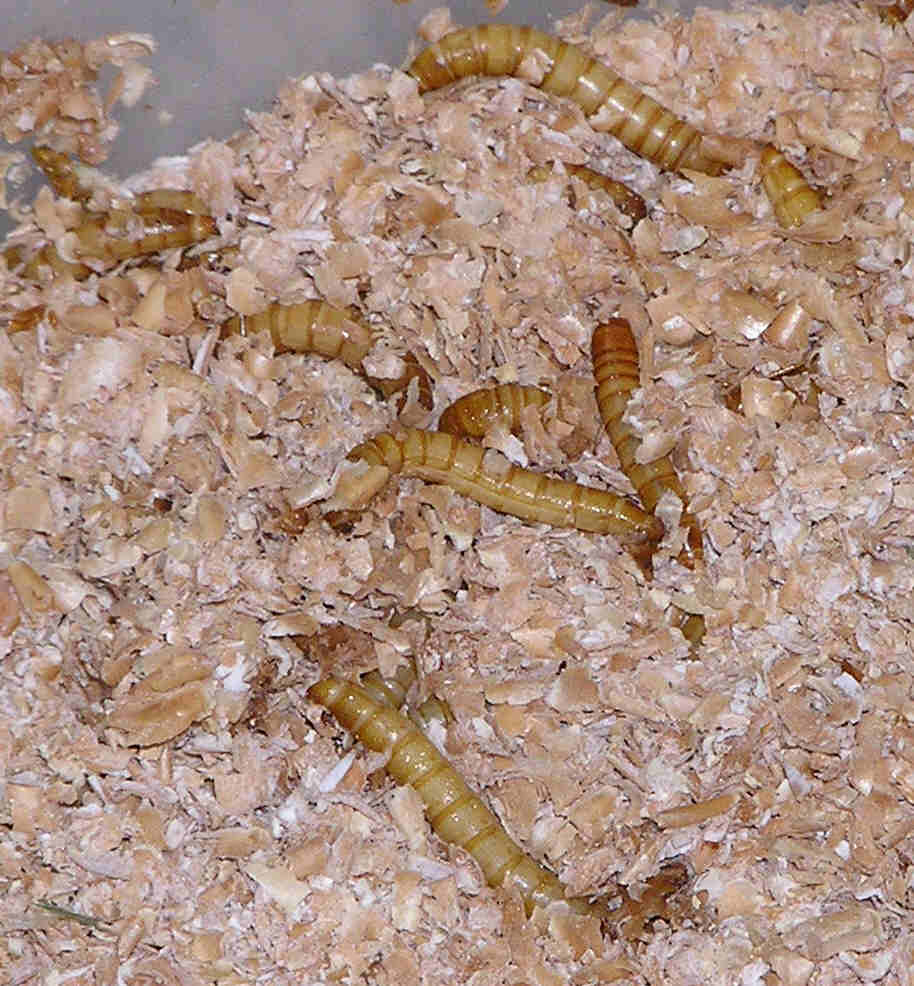
Mealworms, an example of a plastivore

A plastivore is an organism capable of degrading and metabolising plastic. While plastic is normally thought of as non-biodegradable, a variety of bacteria, fungi, and insects have been found to degrade it.

== Definition ==
Plastivores are "organisms that use plastic as their primary carbon and energy source". This does not necessarily mean being able to fulfill all biological needs from plastic alone. For example, mealworms fed only on plastic show very little weight gain, unlike mealworms fed on a normal diet of bran. This is due to plastic lacking water and nutrients needed to grow. Plastic-fed mealworms can still derive energy from their diet, so they do not lose weight like starved mealworms do.

== Mechanisms ==
For both bacterial and fungal plastivores, the first step is adhesion of spores to the plastic surface via hydrophobic interactions.

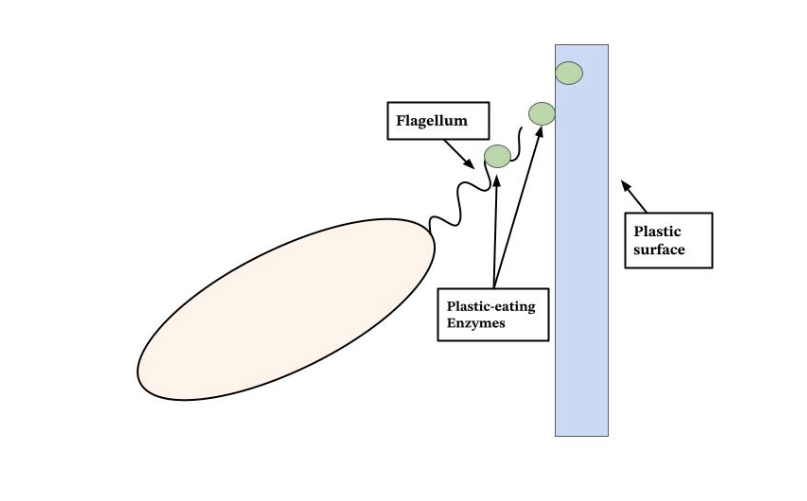
Diagram showing how Ideonella sakaiensis metabolises plastic

Bacterial plastivores, when cultured on plastic, form biofilms on the surface as the second step. Using enzymes, they increase the roughness of the surface and oxidize the plastic. Oxidation forms oxygenated groups such as carbonyl groups, used by the bacteria for carbon and energy, and also converts the plastic into smaller molecules (depolymerization).

For fungal plastivores, the second step is growth of mycelia (root-like structures of fungi, composed of thread-like hyphae) on the surface, while the third step is secretion of enzymes. Both the enzymes as well as the mechanical force produced by fungal hyphae degrades the plastic.

Following the same basic chemical process as fungi and bacteria, insect plastivores also oxidate and depolymerize plastic to digest it. For example, the saliva of waxworms contains enzymes that can oxidize and depolymerize polyethylene. Insects may also utilize enzymes produced by internal gut microbiota. For example, in mealworms, sterilization of the gut microbiome via antibiotics inhibits their ability to digest polystyrene.

== Examples ==
The following is not an exhaustive list. Plastivorous activity seems to be quite common in nature, with a 2011 sampling of endophytic fungi in the Amazon finding that almost half of the fungi showed some activity.

=== Bacteria ===
Plastic pollution in the oceans supports many species of bacteria.

The alkaliphilic bacteria Bacillus pseudofirmus and Salipaludibacillus agaradhaerens can degrade low-density polyethylene (LDPE). These bacteria can degrade LDPE on their own but work more quickly as a consortium of both species, and degradation is faster still when iron oxide nanoparticles are added.

Exiguobacterium sibiricum and E. undae, isolated from a wetland in India, can degrade polystyrene. Similarly, Exiguobacterium sp. strain YT2 has been isolated from the gut of mealworms, which are themselves plastivores, and can degrade polystyrene on its own, though less quickly than mealworms.

Acinetobacter sp. AnTc-1, isolated from the gut of plastivorous red flour beetle larvae, can likewise degrade polystyrene on its own.

Ideonella sakaiensis and Comamonas testosteroni can degrade polyethylene terephthalate.

=== Fungi ===
Aspergillus tubingensis and several isolates of Pestalotiopsis are capable of degrading polyurethane.

Polycarbonate, the main material in CDs, is attacked by a range of fungi: Bjerkandera adusta (initially misidentified as Geotrichum sp.), Chaetomium globosum, Trichoderma atroviride, Coniochaeta sp., Cladosporium cladosporioides and Penicillium chrysogenum.

=== Insects ===
Mealworms (Tenebrio molitor), a species commonly used as animal feed, can consume polyethylene and polystyrene. Its congener T. obscurus can also consume polystyrene, as can superworm (Zophobas atratus) and red flour beetle (Tribolium castaneum) from different genera in the same family.

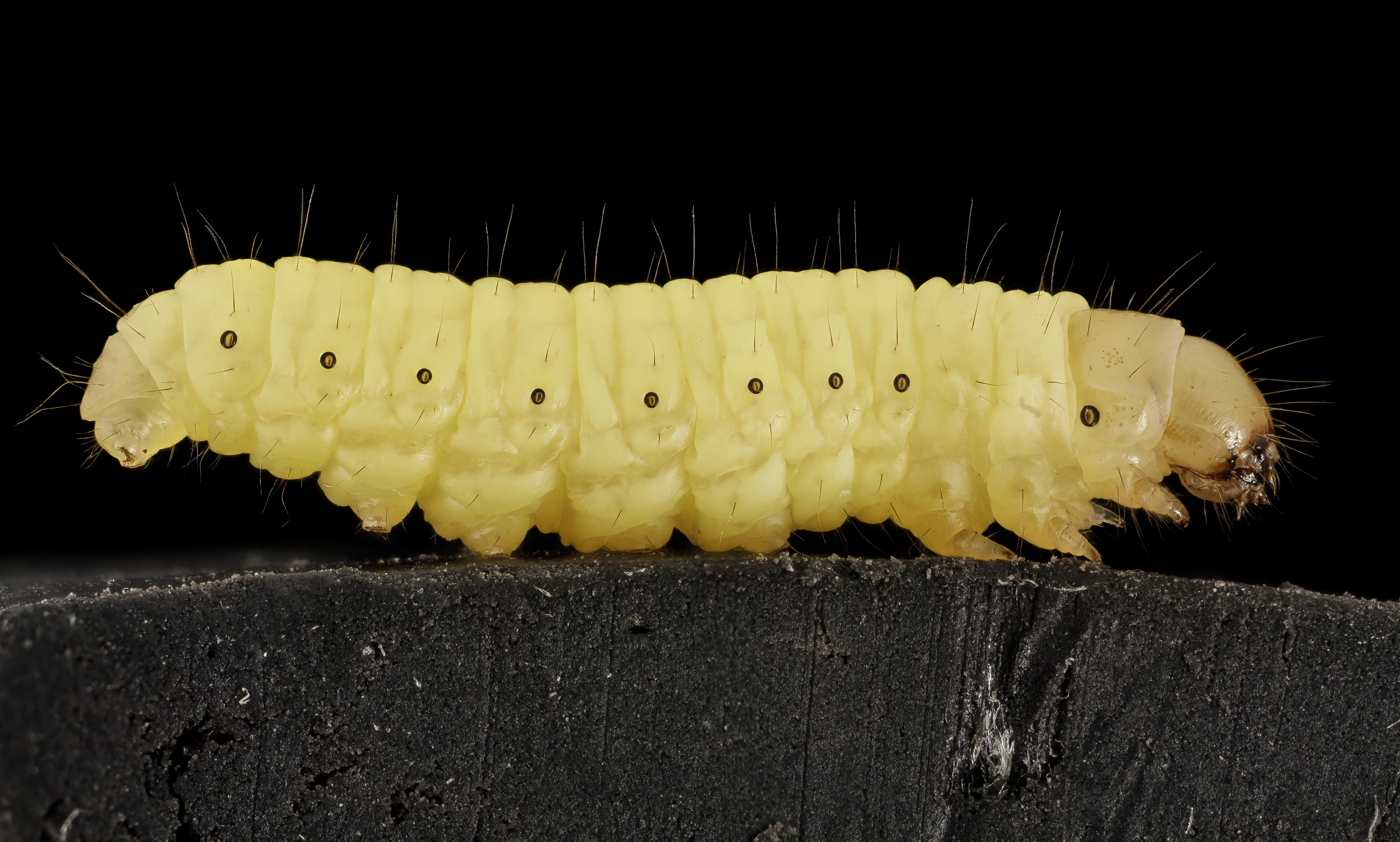
A waxworm

Plastivory also occurs in Lepidoptera, with waxworms (Galleria mellonella) able to consume polyethylene. Even homogenising waxworms and applying the homogenate to polyethylene can cause degradation. This species is the fastest known organism to chemically modify polyethylene, with oxidation occurring within one hour from exposure.

== See also ==
- Plastisphere
