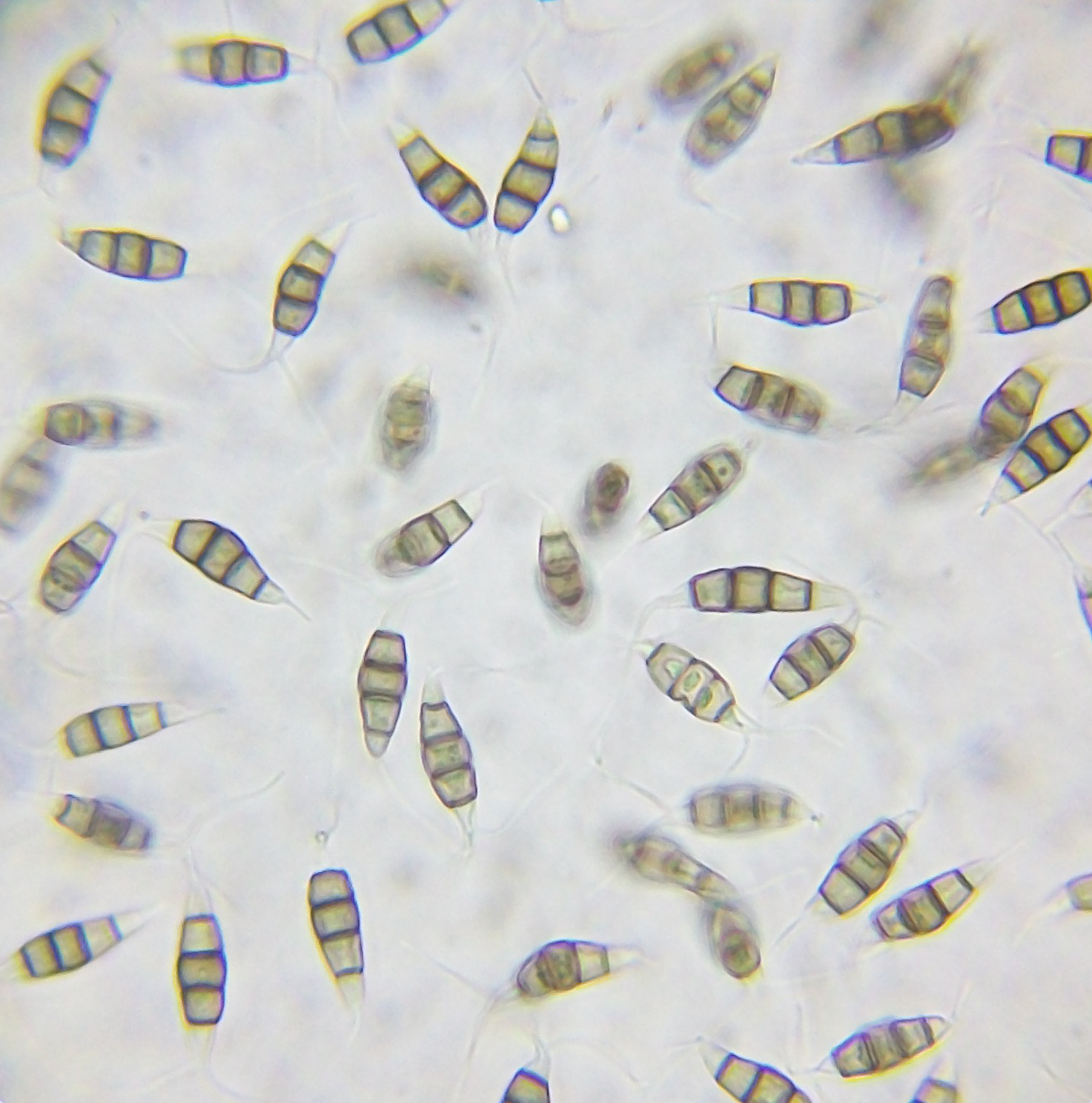
- Conidia of Pestalotiopsis microspora

Scientific classification
- Kingdom: Fungi
- Division: Ascomycota
- Class: Sordariomycetes
- Order: Amphisphaeriales
- Family: Sporocadaceae
- Genus: Pestalotiopsis
- Species: P. microspora

Binomial name
- Pestalotiopsis microspora (Speg.) G.C. Zhao & N. Li

Synonyms
- Pestalotia dichaeta Speg.; Pestalotia micheneri Guba; Pestalotia microspora Speg.; Pestalotiopsis dichaeta (Speg.) Steyaert

= Pestalotiopsis microspora =

Species of fungus

Pestalotiopsis microspora
- Mycological characteristics
- Hymenium attachment is not applicable
- Lacks a stipe
- Spore print is blackish-brown
- Ecology is parasitic
- Edibility is unknown

Pestalotiopsis microspora is a species of endophytic fungus capable of breaking down and digesting polyurethane. It was first described from Buenos Aires, Argentina in 1880 by mycologist Carlo Luigi Spegazzini, who named it Pestalotia microspora.

Originally identified in fallen foliage of common ivy (Hedera helix) in Buenos Aires, it also causes leaf spot in Hypericum 'Hidcote' (Hypericum patulum) shrubs in Japan.

In 1996, Julie C. Lee first isolated torreyanic acid, a dimeric quinone, from P. microspora, and noted that the species is likely the cause of the decline of Florida torreya (Torreya taxifolia), an endangered species of a tree that is related to the paclitaxel-producing yew tree Taxus brevifolia.

Its polyurethane degradation activity was identified only in the 2010s in two distinct P. microspora strains isolated from plant stems in the Yasuni National Forest within the Ecuadorian Amazon rainforest by a group of student researchers led by molecular biochemistry professor Scott Strobel as part of Yale University's annual Rainforest Expedition and Laboratory. It is the first fungus species found to be able to subsist on polyurethane in anaerobic conditions. This makes the fungus a potential candidate for bioremediation projects involving large quantities of plastic.

== See also ==
- Plastivore
- Aspergillus tubingensis, another fungus that can digest polyurethane
- Ideonella sakaiensis, a bacterium capable of breaking down PET
- Galleria mellonella, a caterpillar that can digest polyethylene
