= Alkalibacillus almallahensis =

Scientific classification
- Domain: Bacteria
- Kingdom: Bacillati
- Phylum: Bacillota
- Class: Bacilli
- Order: Bacillales
- Family: Alkalibacillaceae
- Genus: Alkalibacillus
- Species: A. almallahensis

Binomial name
- Alkalibacillus almallahensis Perez-Dav et al. 2014

Type strain
- CECT 8373, DSM 27545, S1LM8

Synonyms
- Alkalobacillus saladarense

Species of bacterium

Alkalibacillus almallahensis is a Gram-positive, halophilic, endospore-forming, rod-shaped and non-motile bacterium from the genus Alkalibacillus which has been isolated from sediments from a saltern from La Malahá in Spain.
