= Alkalibacillus salilacus =

Scientific classification
- Domain: Bacteria
- Kingdom: Bacillati
- Phylum: Bacillota
- Class: Bacilli
- Order: Bacillales
- Family: Alkalibacillaceae
- Genus: Alkalibacillus
- Species: A. salilacus

Binomial name
- Alkalibacillus salilacus Jeon et al. 2005

Type strain
- BH163

Species of bacterium

Alkalibacillus salilacus is a bacterium from the genus Alkalibacillus.
