= Terribacillus halophilus =

Scientific classification
- Domain: Bacteria
- Kingdom: Bacillati
- Phylum: Bacillota
- Class: Bacilli
- Order: Bacillales
- Family: Bacillaceae
- Genus: Terribacillus
- Species: T. halophilus

Binomial name
- Terribacillus halophilus An et al. 2007

Type strain
- IAM 15310, JCM 21760, KCTC 13937, strain 002-051

Species of bacterium

Terribacillus halophilus is a Gram-positive, strictly aerobic and non-motile bacterium from the genus of Terribacillus which has been isolated from field soil from Tama in Japan.
