= Alkalibacillus halophilus =

Scientific classification
- Domain: Bacteria
- Kingdom: Bacillati
- Phylum: Bacillota
- Class: Bacilli
- Order: Bacillales
- Family: Alkalibacillaceae
- Genus: Alkalibacillus
- Species: A. halophilus

Binomial name
- Alkalibacillus halophilus Tian et al. 2009

Type strain
- DSM 17369, KCTC 3990, YIM 012

Species of bacterium

Alkalibacillus halophilus is a Gram-positive, halophilic, spore-forming and motile bacterium from the genus Alkalibacillus which has been isolated from saline soil from China.
