= Alkalibacillus flavidus =

Scientific classification
- Domain: Bacteria
- Kingdom: Bacillati
- Phylum: Bacillota
- Class: Bacilli
- Order: Bacillales
- Family: Alkalibacillaceae
- Genus: Alkalibacillus
- Species: A. flavidus

Binomial name
- Alkalibacillus flavidus Yoon et al. 2010

Type strain
- ISL-17

Species of bacterium

Alkalibacillus flavidus is a Gram-positive, rod-shaped and motile bacterium from the genus Alkalibacillus which has been isolated from a marine solar saltern from the Yellow Sea.
