= Salipaludibacillus neizhouensis =

Scientific classification
- Domain: Bacteria
- Kingdom: Bacillati
- Phylum: Bacillota
- Class: Bacilli
- Order: Bacillales
- Family: Bacillaceae
- Genus: Salipaludibacillus
- Species: S. neizhouensis

Binomial name
- Salipaludibacillus neizhouensis (Chen et al. 2009) Sultanpuram and Mothe 2016

Type strain
- JSM 071004, CCTCC AB 207161, DSM 19794, KCTC 13187

Synonyms
- Bacillus neizhouensis

Species of bacterium

Salipaludibacillus neizhouensis is a Gram-positive, facultatively alkaliphilic, slightly halophilic, endospore-forming, rod-shaped, aerobic and non-motil bacterium from the genus of Salipaludibacillus which has been isolated from a sea anemone from Neizhou Bay from the South China Sea.
