= Alkalibacillus haloalkaliphilus =

Scientific classification
- Domain: Bacteria
- Kingdom: Bacillati
- Phylum: Bacillota
- Class: Bacilli
- Order: Bacillales
- Family: Alkalibacillaceae
- Genus: Alkalibacillus
- Species: A. haloalkaliphilus

Binomial name
- Alkalibacillus haloalkaliphilus (Fritze 1996) Jeon et al. 2005

Type strain
- WN13

Synonyms
- Bacillus haloalkaliphilus

Species of bacterium

Alkalibacillus haloalkaliphilus is a obligately alkaliphilic and extremely halotolerant bacterium from the genus Alkalibacillus.
