= Alkalibacillus silvisoli =

Scientific classification
- Domain: Bacteria
- Kingdom: Bacillati
- Phylum: Bacillota
- Class: Bacilli
- Order: Bacillales
- Family: Bacillaceae
- Genus: Alkalibacillus
- Species: A. silvisoli

Binomial name
- Alkalibacillus silvisoli Usami et al. 2007

Type strain
- BM2, CIP 109569, DSM 18495, JCM 14193

Synonyms
- Alkalibacillus silvaisolus

Species of bacterium

Alkalibacillus silvisoli is a Gram-positive, aerobic, rod-shaped, moderately halophilic, alkaliphilic and motile bacterium from the genus of Alkalibacillus which has been isolated from forest soil from Kawagoe in Japan.
