= Terribacillus goriensis =

Scientific classification
- Domain: Bacteria
- Kingdom: Bacillati
- Phylum: Bacillota
- Class: Bacilli
- Order: Bacillales
- Family: Bacillaceae
- Genus: Terribacillus
- Species: T. goriensis

Binomial name
- Terribacillus goriensis (Kim et al. 2007) Krishnamurthi and Chakrabarti 2008

Type strain
- CL-GR16, DSM 18252, KCCM 42329

Synonyms
- Goribacillus litoralis, Pelagibacillus goriensis

Species of bacterium

Terribacillus goriensis is a Gram-positive, moderately halotolerant, strictly aerobic, rod-shaped and motile bacterium from the genus of Terribacillus which has been isolated from sea water from Busan in Korea.
