= Alkalibacillus filiformis =

Scientific classification
- Domain: Bacteria
- Kingdom: Bacillati
- Phylum: Bacillota
- Class: Bacilli
- Order: Bacillales
- Family: Bacillaceae
- Genus: Alkalibacillus
- Species: A. filiformis

Binomial name
- Alkalibacillus filiformis Romano et al. 2005

Type strain
- 4AG, ATCC BAA-956, CIP 109217, DSM 15448, JCM 13893

Species of bacterium

Alkalibacillus filiformis is a Gram-positive, haloalkaliphilic and non-motile bacterium from the genus of Alkalibacillus which has been isolated from water and mud from Malvizza, Montecalvo Irpino, Italy.
