= Salipaludibacillus aurantiacus =

Scientific classification
- Domain: Bacteria
- Kingdom: Bacillati
- Phylum: Bacillota
- Class: Bacilli
- Order: Bacillales
- Family: Bacillaceae
- Genus: Salipaludibacillus
- Species: S. aurantiacus

Binomial name
- Salipaludibacillus aurantiacus Sultanpuram and Mothe 2016

Type strain
- KCTC 33633, LMG 28644, strain S9

Species of bacterium

Salipaludibacillus aurantiacus is a Gram-positive, rod-shaped, endospore-forming and non-motile bacterium from the genus of Salipaludibacillus which has been isolated from the Narayan Sarovar lake in India.
