= Bacillus infernus =

Scientific classification
- Domain: Bacteria
- Kingdom: Bacillati
- Phylum: Bacillota
- Class: Bacilli
- Order: Caryophanales
- Family: Bacillaceae
- Genus: Bacillus
- Species: B. infernus

Binomial name
- Bacillus infernus Boone et al., 1995

Species of bacterium

Bacillus infernus is a thermophilic, strictly anaerobic bacterium of the genus Bacillus that lives in deep terrestrial subsurface areas. It was first isolated in depths of 2.65 kilometers (1.65 mi) to 2.77 kilometers (1.72 mi) in the Taylorsville Triassic Basin in Virginia, and grew well at 50 °C (122 °F) but not at 40° or 65 °C.

== Popular culture ==
Bacillus infernus premiered in the 2008 The Andromeda Strain. The bacteria's origin was erroneously attributed to hydrothermal vents instead of a buried triassic rift basin.
