= Salinibacillus xinjiangensis =

Scientific classification
- Domain: Bacteria
- Kingdom: Bacillati
- Phylum: Bacillota
- Class: Bacilli
- Order: Bacillales
- Family: Bacillaceae
- Genus: Salinibacillus
- Species: S. xinjiangensis

Binomial name
- Salinibacillus xinjiangensis Yang et al. 2014

Type strain
- CGMCC 1.12331, J4, JCM 18732

Species of bacterium

Salinibacillus xinjiangensis is a Gram-positive, endospore-forming, halophilic and rod-shaped bacterium from the genus of Salinibacillus which has been isolated from a lake from the Xinjiang Uyghur Autonomous Region in China.
