= Torreyanic acid =

Group of chemical compounds

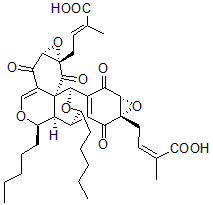

Clinical data
- ATC code: none

Identifiers
- IUPAC name: (2E,2'E)-4,4'-[(1aR,5R,5aS,7aS,8aR,10aS,11aS)-2,7,9,11-tetraoxo-5,13-dipentyl-1a,2,5a,6,7,8a,9,10-octahydro-10,6-(epoxymethano)bis[1]benzoxireno[3,4-d:3',4'-g]isochromene-7a,11a(5H,11H)-diyl]bis(2-met hylbut-2-enoic acid)
- CAS Number: 176260-42-7
- PubChem CID: 21722714
- ChemSpider: 10307511

Chemical and physical data
- Formula: C_{38}H_{44}O_{12}
- Molar mass: 692.758 g·mol^{−1}
- 3D model (JSmol): Interactive image
- SMILES: CCCCC[C@@H]1[C@H]2C3C(OC([C@@]24C(=CO1)C(=O)[C@H]5[C@@](C4=O)(O5)C/C=C(\C)/C(=O)O)C6=C3C(=O)[C@@]7([C@H](C6=O)O7)C/C=C(\C)/C(=O)O)CCCCC
- InChI: InChI=1S/C38H44O12/c1-5-7-9-11-21-23-24-25(28(40)32-36(49-32,29(24)41)15-13-18(3)33(42)43)30(48-21)38-20(17-47-22(26(23)38)12-10-8-6-2)27(39)31-37(50-31,35(38)46)16-14-19(4)34(44)45/h13-14,17,21-23,26,30-32H,5-12,15-16H2,1-4H3,(H,42,43)(H,44,45)/b18-13+,19-14+/t21?,22-,23?,26+,30?,31+,32+,36-,37+,38-/m1/s1; Key:DQBVXDMPCDAQGS-YOWCJFHESA-N

Torreyanic acid is a dimeric quinone first isolated and by Lee et al. in 1996 from an endophyte, Pestalotiopsis microspora. This endophyte is likely the cause of the decline of Florida torreya (Torreya taxifolia), an endangered species that is related to the taxol-producing Taxus brevifolia. The natural product was found to be cytotoxic against 25 different human cancer cell lines with an average IC50 value of 9.4 μg/mL, ranging from 3.5 (NEC) to 45 (A549) μg/mL. Torreyanic acid was found to be 5-10 times more potent in cell lines sensitive to protein kinase C (PKC) agonists, 12-o-tetradecanoyl phorbol-13-acetate (TPA), and was shown to cause cell death via apoptosis. Torreyanic acid also promoted G1 arrest of G0 synchronized cells at 1-5 μg/mL levels, depending on the cell line. It has been proposed that the eukaryotic translation initiation factor EIF-4a is a potential biochemical target for the natural compound.

== Biosynthesis ==
There are over 150 natural products that are presumed to undergo a [4+2] Diels–Alder type cycloaddition, belonging to classes such as: polyketides, terpenoids, phenylpropanoids, and alkaloids. The Diels–Alder cycloaddition involves the overlap of the p-orbitals of two unsaturated systems: a 1,3-diene and dienophile. The conjugated diene reacts with the dienophile to form a cyclic product in a concerted fashion. This reaction is widely used in synthesis due to its facile nature and reio- and stereoselectivity under mild conditions. This reaction is very useful for forming carbon-carbon bonds, four-chiral centers, and quaternary stereogenic centers.[4,5] Natural products that are constructed biosynthetically via a Diels–Alder reaction occur both uncatalyzed and catalyzed by enzymes such as Diels–Alderase and RNA Diels-Alderase. In their report of the isolation and structural characterization of the natural product, Lee and co-worker proposed that the biosynthesis of torreyanic acid proceeded via an endo-selective [4+2] cycloaddition with a Diels–Alder dimerization of 2H-pyran monomers 2a and 2b. Key observations that indicate a natural product is biosynthesized via a Diels–Alder reaction include: (a) isolation of an adduct with its corresponding precursor, (b) presence of adducts and their regio- and diastereoisomers, (c) a non-enzymatic feasibility of a likely cycloaddition and (d) chirality of the adducts.

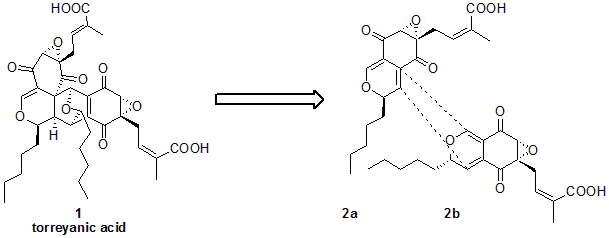

The proposed biosynthetic pathway is thought to involve: (a) an electrocyclic ring closure of 3, followed by (b) an enzymatic oxidation to furnish diastereomers 2a and 2b, and finally (c) a [4+2] cyclodimerization to generate torreyanic acid 1. The biosynthesis of torreyanic acid was studied extensively by Poroco et al. in their efforts to execute the first total synthesis of the natural product. Given that monomer ambuic acid was also isolated from the same endophytic fungus Pestalotiopsis microspora, it is further evidence that a Diels–Alder reaction is involved in the biosynthesis of torreyanic acid. The biomimetic synthesis of torreyanic acid involved the rapid conversion of aldehyde 3 to syn- and anti-pyrans 2a and 2b via an oxaelectrocyclization, with the pyrans existing as an equilibrium mixture. Next, a spontaneous Diels–Alder dimerization of 2a and 2b proceeded with complete and regio- and diastereoselectivity to furnish the endo-adduct, torreyanic acid 1. Further, a retro-Diels–Alder reaction carried out at 60 °C proved that torreyanic acid originated from 2a and 2b and ¹H-NMR spectra showed that no aldehyde 3 was observed. The stable transition state in the Diels–Alder reaction (shown with 2a and 2b) has an energy of 9.4kcal/mol, and coupled with the high reactivity of the diastereomers, it is indicated that the Diels–Alder reaction proceeds in a non-enzymatic manner.

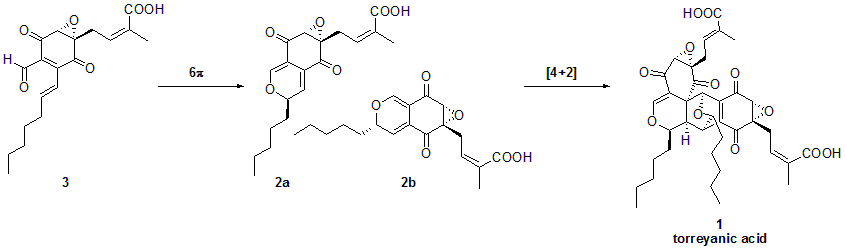

== Total synthesis ==
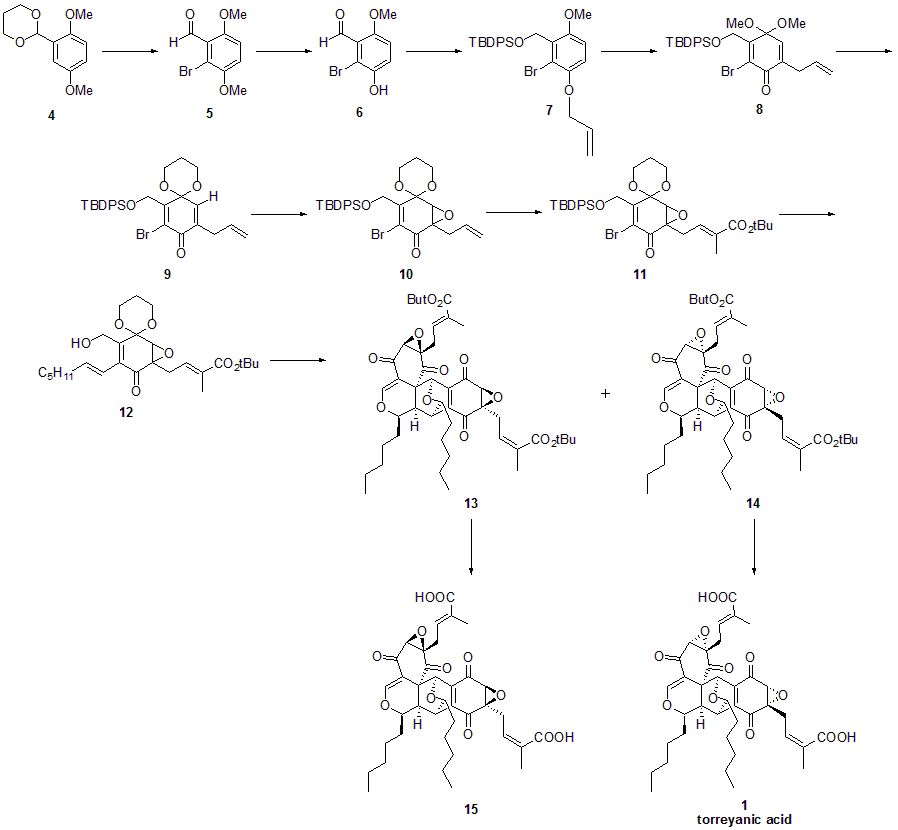
The first total synthesis of torreyanic acid was reported by Porco and co-workers in 2000. This total synthesis aimed to employ and confirm the Diels–Alder genesis proposed by Lee et al. To synthesize the monomers required for Diels–Alder dimerization, 1,3-dioxane intermediate 4 was lithiated with BuLi, brominated with BrCF_{2}CF_{2}Br, and underwent acid hydrolysis to afford benzaldehyde 5. Upon selective methylation of 5 with sulfuric acid, phenol 6 was produced in 52% yield. Phenol 6 first underwent an allylation with allyl bromide, then a borohydride reduction, and finally a protection with a silyl group to furnish 7. Dimethoxyacetal 8 was furnished upon thermal Claisen rearrangement of 7, which afforded an unstable allyl phenol that directly underwent a hypervalent iodine oxidation with PhI(OAc)_{2} in methanol. 8 was then subjected to an acetal exchange with 1,3-propanediol to afford 1,3-dioxane 9, which was smoothly monoepoxidized with Ph3COOH, KHMDS, −78 °C to −20 °C over 6 hours to afford 10. A 2-methyl-2-butenoic acid moiety was installed to afford 11. Intermediate 11 underwent a Stille vinylation with (E)-tributyl-1-heptenyl stannane, subsequently subjected to TBAF/AcOH for silyl removal and acetal hydrolysis to afford quinone epoxide 12. Treatment of 12 with Dess-Martin periodinane initiated a tandem oxidation-6p-electrocyclization-dimerization to afford two dimeric products 13 and 14. Upon treatment of 13 and 14 with TFA to remove the tert-butyl ester, iso-torreyanic acid 15 and torreyanic acid 1 were afforded, respectively.
