= Etiprednol =

Chemical compound

Clinical data
- Other names: 11β,17α,Dihydroxy-21-oxa-21-ethylpregna-1,4-diene-3,20-dione; Ethyl 11β,17α-dihydroxy-3-oxoandrosta-1,4-diene-17-carboxylate
- Drug class: Corticosteroid; Glucocorticoid

Identifiers
- IUPAC name: Ethyl (8S,9S,10R,11S,13S,14S,17R)-11,17-Dihydroxy-10,13-dimethyl-3-oxo-7,8,9,11,12,14,15,16-octahydro-6H-cyclopenta[a]phenanthrene-17-carboxylate
- CAS Number: 182069-13-2
- PubChem CID: 11462974
- ChemSpider: 9637814
- UNII: 08052A2L6I
- CompTox Dashboard (EPA): DTXSID30171237

Chemical and physical data
- Formula: C_{22}H_{30}O_{5}
- Molar mass: 374.477 g·mol^{−1}
- 3D model (JSmol): Interactive image
- SMILES: CCOC(=O)[C@]1(CC[C@@H]2[C@@]1(C[C@@H]([C@H]3[C@H]2CCC4=CC(=O)C=C[C@]34C)O)C)O
- InChI: InChI=1S/C22H30O5/c1-4-27-19(25)22(26)10-8-16-15-6-5-13-11-14(23)7-9-20(13,2)18(15)17(24)12-21(16,22)3/h7,9,11,15-18,24,26H,4-6,8,10,12H2,1-3H3/t15-,16-,17-,18+,20-,21-,22-/m0/s1; Key:JTXYEERBIZXLJC-DCJXKKNWSA-N

Etiprednol is a synthetic glucocorticoid corticosteroid.
