= Salinibacillus aidingensis =

Scientific classification
- Domain: Bacteria
- Kingdom: Bacillati
- Phylum: Bacillota
- Class: Bacilli
- Order: Bacillales
- Family: Bacillaceae
- Genus: Salinibacillus
- Species: S. aidingensis

Binomial name
- Salinibacillus aidingensis Ren and Zhou 2005

Type strain
- AS 1.3565, JCM 12389, strain 25-7

Species of bacterium

Salinibacillus aidingensis is a Gram-positive, moderately halophilic and heterotrophic bacterium from the genus of Salinibacillus which has been isolated from a lake from Xinjiang in China.
