= Salinibacillus =

Scientific classification
- Domain: Bacteria
- Kingdom: Bacillati
- Phylum: Bacillota
- Class: Bacilli
- Order: Bacillales
- Family: Bacillaceae
- Genus: Salinibacillus; Ren and Zhou 2005

Type species
- Salinibacillus aidingensis Ren & Zhou 2005

Species
- S. aidingensis; S. kushneri; S. xinjiangensis

Genus of bacteria

Salinibacillus is a genus of bacteria from the family of Bacillaceae.

== Phylogeny ==
The currently accepted taxonomy is based on the List of Prokaryotic names with Standing in Nomenclature (LPSN) and National Center for Biotechnology Information (NCBI).

16S rRNA based LTP_10_2024

- Salinibacillus
  - S. xinjiangensis Yang et al. 2014
  - - S. aidingensis Ren & Zhou 2005
    - S. kushneri Ren & Zhou 2005

120 marker proteins based GTDB 09-RS220

- Salinibacillus
  - S. xinjiangensis
  - S. kushneri

== See also ==
- List of bacterial orders
- List of bacteria genera
