= Salipaludibacillus agaradhaerens =

Scientific classification
- Domain: Bacteria
- Kingdom: Bacillati
- Phylum: Bacillota
- Class: Bacilli
- Order: Bacillales
- Family: Bacillaceae
- Genus: Salipaludibacillus
- Species: S. agaradhaerens

Binomial name
- Salipaludibacillus agaradhaerens (Nielsen et al. 1995) Sultanpuram and Mothe 2016

Synonyms
- Bacillus agaradhaerens

Species of bacterium

Salipaludibacillus agaradhaerens is a facultative anaerobe bacterium. It is a gram positive, alkaliphilic and alkalitolerant, aerobic endospore-forming bacteria.

In 2019, it was found in a hyperalkaline spring in Zambales (Philippines) a bacterial consortium of a strain of Bacillus agaradhaerens with Bacillus pseudofirmus that can biodegrade LDPE plastic.

== See also ==
- Plastivore
