= Streptomyces aidingensis =

Scientific classification
- Domain: Bacteria
- Kingdom: Bacillati
- Phylum: Actinomycetota
- Class: Actinomycetia
- Order: Streptomycetales
- Family: Streptomycetaceae
- Genus: Streptomyces
- Species: S. aidingensis

Binomial name
- Streptomyces aidingensis Xia et al. 2013

Type strain
- CGMCC 4.5739, NBRC 108211, TRM 46012

Species of bacterium

Streptomyces aidingensis is a Gram-positive, aerobic bacterium species from the genus of Streptomyces, which has been isolated from sediments of the Aiding Lake in Tulufan Basin in north-west China.

== See also ==
- List of Streptomyces species
