= Terribacillus aidingensis =

Scientific classification
- Domain: Bacteria
- Kingdom: Bacillati
- Phylum: Bacillota
- Class: Bacilli
- Order: Bacillales
- Family: Bacillaceae
- Genus: Terribacillus
- Species: T. aidingensis

Binomial name
- Terribacillus aidingensis Liu et al. 2010

Type strain
- CGMCC 1.8913, NBRC 105790, YI7-61

Species of bacterium

Terribacillus aidingensis is a Gram-positive, moderately halophilic, rod-shaped and motile bacterium from the genus of Terribacillus which has been isolated from soil from the Ayding Lake in China.
