= Alkalibacillus aidingensis =

Scientific classification
- Domain: Bacteria
- Kingdom: Bacillati
- Phylum: Bacillota
- Class: Bacilli
- Order: Bacillales
- Family: Alkalibacillaceae
- Genus: Alkalibacillus
- Species: A. aidingensis

Binomial name
- Alkalibacillus aidingensis Li et al. 2021

Type strain
- YIM 98829

Species of bacterium

Alkalibacillus aidingensis is a Gram-negative, aerobic and motile bacterium from the genus Alkalibacillus which has been isolated from the Aiding Lake in the Xinjiang Province.
