= Alkalihalobacillus pseudofirmus =

Scientific classification
- Domain: Bacteria
- Kingdom: Bacillati
- Phylum: Bacillota
- Class: Bacilli
- Order: Caryophanales
- Family: Bacillaceae
- Genus: Bacillus
- Species: B. pseudofirmus

Binomial name
- Bacillus pseudofirmus Nielsen et al. 1995

Species of bacterium

Bacillus pseudofirmus is a facultative anaerobe bacterium. It is a gram positive, alkaliphilic and alkalitolerant, aerobic endospore-forming bacterium.

In 2019, it was found in a hyperalkaline spring in Zambales (Philippines) a bacterial consortium of a strain of Bacillus pseudofirmus with Bacillus agaradhaerens that can biodegrade LDPE plastic.

This species has been recently transferred into the genus Alkalihalobacillus. The correct nomenclature is Alkalihalobacillus pseudofirmus.
