= Guanacastepene A =

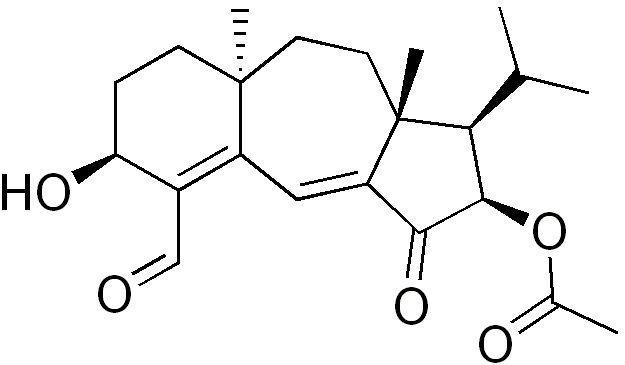

Names
- Preferred IUPAC name (1R,2R,6S,8aR,10aR)-5-Formyl-6-hydroxy-8a,10a-dimethyl-3-oxo-1-(propan-2-yl)-1,2,3,6,7,8,8a,9,10,10a-decahydrobenzo[f]azulen-2-yl acetate

Identifiers
CAS Number	263357-41-1
3D model (JSmol)	Interactive image
ChemSpider	8560244
PubChem CID	10384802
UNII	G5H7ZB2HDF
CompTox Dashboard (EPA)	DTXSID10439100
- InChI: InChI=1S/C22H30O5/c1-12(2)18-20(27-13(3)24)19(26)16-10-15-14(11-23)17(25)6-7-21(15,4)8-9-22(16,18)5/h10-12,17-18,20,25H,6-9H2,1-5H3/t17-,18-,20+,21-,22-/m0/s1 Key: KCPNSIPCHJTGHJ-MYHSIESUSA-N; InChI=1/C22H30O5/c1-12(2)18-20(27-13(3)24)19(26)16-10-15-14(11-23)17(25)6-7-21(15,4)8-9-22(16,18)5/h10-12,17-18,20,25H,6-9H2,1-5H3/t17-,18-,20+,21-,22-/m0/s1 Key: KCPNSIPCHJTGHJ-MYHSIESUBP
- SMILES: O=C\C3=C2/C=C1/C(=O)[C@H](OC(=O)C)[C@@H]([C@]1(CC[C@@]2(CC[C@@H]3O)C)C)C(C)C

Properties
Chemical formula	C_{22}H_{30}O_{5}
Molar mass	374.477 g·mol^{−1}
- Except where otherwise noted, data are given for materials in their standard state (at 25 °C [77 °F], 100 kPa). verify (what is ?) Infobox references

Guanacastepene A is a compound showing antibiotic activity. It is a diterpene that was extracted with hexane from a Costa Rican fungus, CR115, found on the branches of the Daphnopsis americana tree and purified by chromatography.

== Physical and chemical properties ==
In its isolated or synthesized form, the active compound appears as an amorphous white solid, and elemental analysis shows that it consists of 70.56% carbon, 8.07% hydrogen, and 21.36% oxygen. The distinctive chemical feature of Guanacastepene A stems from the so-called guanacastane skeleton.

== Substance Class and Structure ==
Guanacastepene A belongs to the class of diterpenes, a subclass of terpenes composed of four isoprene units (C20). The guanacastepene skeleton is structurally related to dolastane and neodolabellane diterpene families. The structural elucidation was carried out using two methods: ^{1}H-NMR and ^{13}C-NMR as well as X-ray crystal structure. The NMR spectra at room temperature indicated the presence of two conformers in dynamic equilibrium, and through structural characterization using single-crystal X-ray diffraction techniques, the structure of Guanacastepene A was found to be a tricyclic diterpene with a heavily oxidized longitudinal side and a hydrophobic opposite side.

It also revealed that the tricyclic ring of guanacastepene is essentially planar with the exception of C9. Two gauche butane-like conformers are observed around the C9–C10 bond that differ by approximately 0.14 kcal/mol and are separated by an energy barrier of approximately 15 kcal/mol.

== Biochemical Processes ==
=== Isolation ===
Many biologically active natural compounds are derived from fungi, and guanacastepene A is one such compound. Attempts were made to characterize CR115, but CR115 did not form spores under any of the conditions tested, and no other morphological characteristics were observed that provided insight into its phylogeny. rDNA sequence analysis shows a similarity of 90% to an uncharacterized root basidiomycete. The fungal strain was cultivated in potato dextrose broth for 14–21 days. The culture was then extracted with hexane to obtain a crude extract containing nonpolar secondary metabolites. This extract was fractionated by C18 flash column chromatography using an acetonitrile/water (CH_{3}CN/H_{2}O) step gradient and subsequently purified by reverse-phase HPLC.

=== Biosynthesis ===
It is believed that the biosynthesis of guanacastepenes occurs via the mevalonate pathway. This pathway begins with acetyl-CoA and yields both isopentenyl pyrophosphate (IPP) and dimethylallyl pyrophosphate (DMAPP). IPP and DMAPP are then converted into geranylgeranyl pyrophosphate (GGPP), the most important diterpene precursor. A cationic cyclization cascade converts GGPP into the macrocyclic intermediate β-araneosene and ultimately into the dolabellane skeleton. Dolabellane is then rearranged into the neodolabellane skeleton via stereospecific hydride and methyl shifts, thereby fixing the stereochemistry at C11 and C12 and shifting the C15 methyl group across the ring fusion. The carbon skeleton of Guanacastepene A is closely related to the dolastane and neodolabellane families.

Therefore, it is assumed that the biogenesis of dolastanes proceeds via a further intramolecular cyclization of the dolabellane-derived cation, resulting in the tricyclic [5-7-6]-dolastane (guanacastane) skeleton. This basic framework is diversified through a series of oxidation reactions in which the characteristic functional groups of guanacastepenes are incorporated. The guanacastepenes characterized to date represent only a fraction of the metabolites present in the CR115 extract. The tricyclic guanacastepenes A, B, and C are considered the simplest members of this family; successive oxidation and functionalization are thought to lead to the formation of structurally more complex ring systems.

== Synthesis ==
=== Total synthesis ===
To summarize the total synthesis of Guanacastepene A, two independent synthetic routes are particularly relevant here. The first involves an attempt by Danishefsky and his colleagues to close the seven-membered B ring via an intramolecular Horner–Wadsworth–Emmons cyclization; however, this approach unexpectedly favored a kinetically preferred 5-exo cyclization instead. Ultimately, the seven-membered ring was formed via reductive cyclization of a vinyl iodide-ketone precursor, yielding the fused 5,7-ring hydroazulenone core. The quaternary stereocenter at C8 was then stereoselectively introduced via sequential Eschenmoser methylenation and conjugate cuprate addition. It was found that the order of alkylation determines the resulting stereochemistry. An intramolecular Knoevenagel cyclization was ultimately required to complete the guanacastane skeleton. This was achieved only after epoxidation of the corresponding olefin. This was followed by a Rubottom oxidation to introduce the characteristic acetoxy group at C13.

The second, alternative, formal synthesis was developed by Hanna and his colleagues. Instead of forming the six- and seven-membered rings sequentially, they built the six- and seven-membered rings simultaneously in a single tandem ring-closing metathesis (RCM) reaction.

Using a triene precursor, both quaternary stereocenters at C8 and C11 were established prior to the metathesis step. This was treated with the second-generation Grubbs catalyst in refluxing dichloromethane to directly yield the tricyclic skeleton. The required oxygen functionality was then introduced via epoxidation followed by a Lewis acid-catalyzed SN2′-type ring-opening reaction with allyl alcohol. This led to an intermediate that had previously been converted to Guanacastepene A by other groups. Thus, the formal synthesis could be considered complete.

== Biological effects ==
=== Antibacterial Activity ===
Guanacastepene A has been identified as a potent active ingredient against a wide range of pathogens, with a particular focus on its efficacy against highly resistant clinical isolates. In screening tests, such as the agar diffusion method and the microbroth dilution method, the susceptibility of microorganisms to the active compound Guanacastepene A was determined. In the agar diffusion method, efficacy was assessed by the formation of growth inhibition zones on the solid medium of the test plates. The results indicate that Guanacastepene A exhibits moderate activity against Gram-positive bacteria and poor to low activity against Gram-negative bacteria.

In another agar diffusion test, Guanacastepene A produced an inhibition zone against MRSA; particularly noteworthy is its activity against vancomycin-resistant enterococci (VRE/VREF), against which conventional antibiotics such as vancomycin are ineffective. Using the microbroth dilution method, a minimum inhibitory concentration (MIC) of 62.5 µg/ml was determined for a specific test strain (E. coli imp). In this regard, mechanistic studies on Escherichia coli demonstrate that Guanacastepene A has a bactericidal effect. Thus, the active compound not only inhibits growth (bacteriostatic) but actually leads to the death of bacterial cells.

=== Mechanism of action ===
The primary mechanism of the bactericidal effect of Guanacastepene A is direct damage to the bacterial membrane. Mechanistic studies on Escherichia coli imp demonstrate that treatment with the active ingredient leads to a rapid and massive efflux of intracellular potassium, which is indicative of membrane perforation. The interaction with the lipid bilayer of the cell membrane is presumably due to the fact that the molecular structure, with one polar and one hydrophobic side, exhibits an amphiphilic character. Furthermore, studies on macromolecular synthesis have shown that Guanacastepene A inhibits the incorporation of radioactively labeled precursors into DNA, RNA, and proteins almost simultaneously.

=== Hemolytic effect ===
Guanacastepene A also exhibits a significant toxic side effect in that it possesses pronounced hemolytic activity, which leads to the lysis of erythrocytes (human red blood cells). The strongest hemolytic effect was observed in laboratory tests at concentrations between 8 and 32 µg/ml. However, this effect diminishes at very high concentrations (above 64 µg/ml) as well as at very low concentrations (below 8 µg/ml). The mechanism of cell membrane damage is not selective enough for bacteria; eukaryotic cell membranes are also affected by the damaging effect of Guanacastepene A.

== Application ==
Due to the hemolytic toxicity of Guanacastepene A, it is not currently used directly in human clinical medicine. Its main potential, however, lies in its function as a "resistance breaker" against antibiotic-resistant pathogens, as various experiments have demonstrated its efficacy against methicillin-resistant Staphylococcus aureus (MRSA) and vancomycin-resistant Enterococcus faecalis (VRE).

Furthermore, a more specific area of application arises in antifungal research, as newly isolated members of the guanacastane family, such as guanacastepene V, isolated from the marine fungus Coprinellus xanthothrix discovered on the surface of a barnacle off the coast of Japan (Kashima City), exhibit a selective effect against the yeast Candida auris. This species is considered an emerging multidrug-resistant yeast. Although guanacastepene V inhibits the growth of Candida auris with an MIC of 6.25 µg/ml, it also exhibits high selectivity, as it has virtually no effect on Candida albicans at an MIC of 100 µg/ml.

Therefore, opportunities may arise to further develop other members of the guanacastane family to combat Candida albicans outbreaks in hospitals. Guanacastepene A also serves as a challenging target molecule for total chemical synthesis, making it useful for developing and testing novel synthetic methods; examples include the controlled fragmentation of cyclobutane rings or innovative variants of the Robinson annulation reaction for constructing complex seven-membered ring systems. Current research in this area aims to modify the chemical composition by synthesizing a broader spectrum of analogs, so that antibacterial activity can be separated from hemolytic toxicity.
