= Salipaludibacillus =

Scientific classification
- Domain: Bacteria
- Kingdom: Bacillati
- Phylum: Bacillota
- Class: Bacilli
- Order: Bacillales
- Family: Bacillaceae
- Genus: Salipaludibacillus; Sultanpuram and Mothe 2016

Type species
- Salipaludibacillus aurantiacus Sultanpuram & Mothe 2016

Species
- S. agaradhaerens; S. aurantiacus; S. daqingensis; S. halalkaliphilus; "S. keqinensis"; S. neizhouensis

Genus of bacteria

Salipaludibacillus is a gram-positive genus of bacteria from the family Bacillaceae.

== Phylogeny ==
The currently accepted taxonomy is based on the List of Prokaryotic names with Standing in Nomenclature (LPSN) and National Center for Biotechnology Information (NCBI).

16S rRNA based LTP_10_2024

- - - Salipaludibacillus~1
      - Salipaludibacillus halalkaliphilus Amoozegar et al. 2018
      - Salipaludibacillus neizhouensis (Chen et al. 2009) Sultanpuram & Mothe 2016
  - - Salipaludibacillus agaradhaerens (Nielsen, Fritze & Priest 1995) Sultanpuram & Mothe 2016
    - - - Salipaludibacillus~2
          - Salipaludibacillus daqingensis Guo et al. 2023
          - "Salipaludibacillus keqinensis" Wang et al. 2019
      - - Salipaludibacillus aurantiacus Sultanpuram & Mothe 2016
        - Alkalicoccus

120 marker proteins based GTDB 09-RS220

- Salipaludibacillus
  - - "S. keqinensis"
    - S. neizhouensis
  - - S. agaradhaerens
    - S. aurantiacus
