= Ureibacillus =

Scientific classification
- Domain: Bacteria
- Kingdom: Bacillati
- Phylum: Bacillota
- Class: Bacilli
- Order: Caryophanales
- Family: Caryophanaceae
- Genus: Ureibacillus; Fortina et al. 2001

Type species
- Ureibacillus thermosphaericus (Andersson et al. 1996) Fortina et al. 2001

Species
- See text

Genus of bacteria

Ureibacillus is a genus of gram-positive bacteria within the largely gram-positive Bacillota. Ureibacilli are motile and form spherical endospores. The type species of the genus is Ureibacillus thermosphaericus.

== History ==
The genus Ureibacillus was split from the genus Bacillus in 2001 to encompass Bacillus thermosphaericus (now Ureibacillus thermosphaericus) as well as several newly discovered similar strains of bacteria.

In 2020, multiple Lysinibacillus species were transferred into Ureibacillus based on branching patterns in various phylogenetic trees constructed based on conserved genome sequences, indicating their phylogenetic relatedness. The family Caryophanaceae encompassed many branching anomalies such as this one, partially due to the reliance on 16S rRNA sequences as a method for classification, which is known to have low resolution power and give differing results depending on the algorithm used.

Analysis of genome sequences from Ureibacillus species identified three conserved signature indels (CSIs) that are uniquely present in this genus in the following proteins: MFS transporter, EamA family transporter, and DNA internalization-related competence protein ComEC/Rec2. These CSIs provide a reliable molecular method for distinguishing Ureibacillus species from other genera within the family Caryophanaceae and all other bacteria.

== Phylogeny ==
The currently accepted taxonomy is based on the List of Prokaryotic names with Standing in Nomenclature (LPSN) and National Center for Biotechnology Information (NCBI)

16S rRNA based LTP_10_2024

- Ureibacillus
  - U. defluvii Zhou et al. 2014
  - - U. thermosphaericus
    - - U. terrenus
      - - U. composti Weon et al. 2007 non (Hayat et al. 2014) Li et al. 2024
        - - U. suwonensis Kim et al. 2006
          - U. thermophilus

- - - Lysinibacillus ~1
      - "U. alkaliphilus" (Zhao et al. 2015) Gupta and Patel 2020
      - U. composti (Hayat et al. 2014) Li et al. 2024 non Weon et al. 2007
  - - - Lysinibacillus ~2
        - "U. halotolerans"
        - - "U. antri"
          - - U. endophyticus
            - U. xlyeni Gupta & Patel 2020
    - - - Ureibacillus ~1
          - U. massiliensis
          - - U. acetophenoni
            - U. manganicus
      - - "U. telephonicus"
        - - U. yapensis
          - - Ureibacillus ~2
              - U. chungkukjangi
              - U. sinduriensis

120 marker proteins based GTDB 09-RS220

- Ureibacillus
  - - U. thermosphaericus (Andersson et al. 1996) Fortina et al. 2001
    - - U. terrenus Fortina et al. 2001
      - U. thermophilus Weon et al. 2007
  - - - U. composti Weon et al. 2007 non (Hayat et al. 2014) Li et al. 2024
      - U. composti (Hayat et al. 2014) Li et al. 2024 non Weon et al. 2007
    - - - U. massiliensis (Glazunova, Raoult & Roux 2006) Gupta & Patel 2020
        - - "Lysinibacillus timonensis" Ndiaye et al. 2019
          - - U. acetophenoni (Azmatunnisa et al. 2015) Gupta & Patel 2020
            - U. manganicus (Liu et al. 2013) Gupta & Patel 2020
      - - - "U. antri" (Narsing Rao et al. 2020) Yadav et al. 2024
          - - U. endophyticus (Yu et al. 2017) Li et al. 2024
            - U. xlyeni Gupta & Patel 2020
        - - "U. telephonicus" (Rahi et al. 2017) Gupta and Patel 2020
          - - - U. galli Pallen 2024
              - "U. halotolerans" (Kong et al. 2014) Gupta and Patel 2020
            - - U. yapensis (Yu et al. 2020) Li et al. 2024
              - - U. chungkukjangi (Kim et al. 2013) Gupta & Patel 2020
                - U. sinduriensis (Jung et al. 2012) Gupta & Patel 2020

Unassigned species:

- "U. aquaedulcis" Yadav et al. 2024

== See also ==
- List of bacterial orders
- List of bacteria genera
