= Jungle rot =

Jungle rot may refer to:

== In medicine ==
- Tropical ulcer, a chronic ulcerative skin lesion caused by polymicrobial infection
- Trench foot, damage to feet from cumulative water immersion, particularly in the context of the US involvement in the Vietnam War

== In media ==
- Jungle Rot (band)
