= Cold injury =

- Other names: Cold weather injury
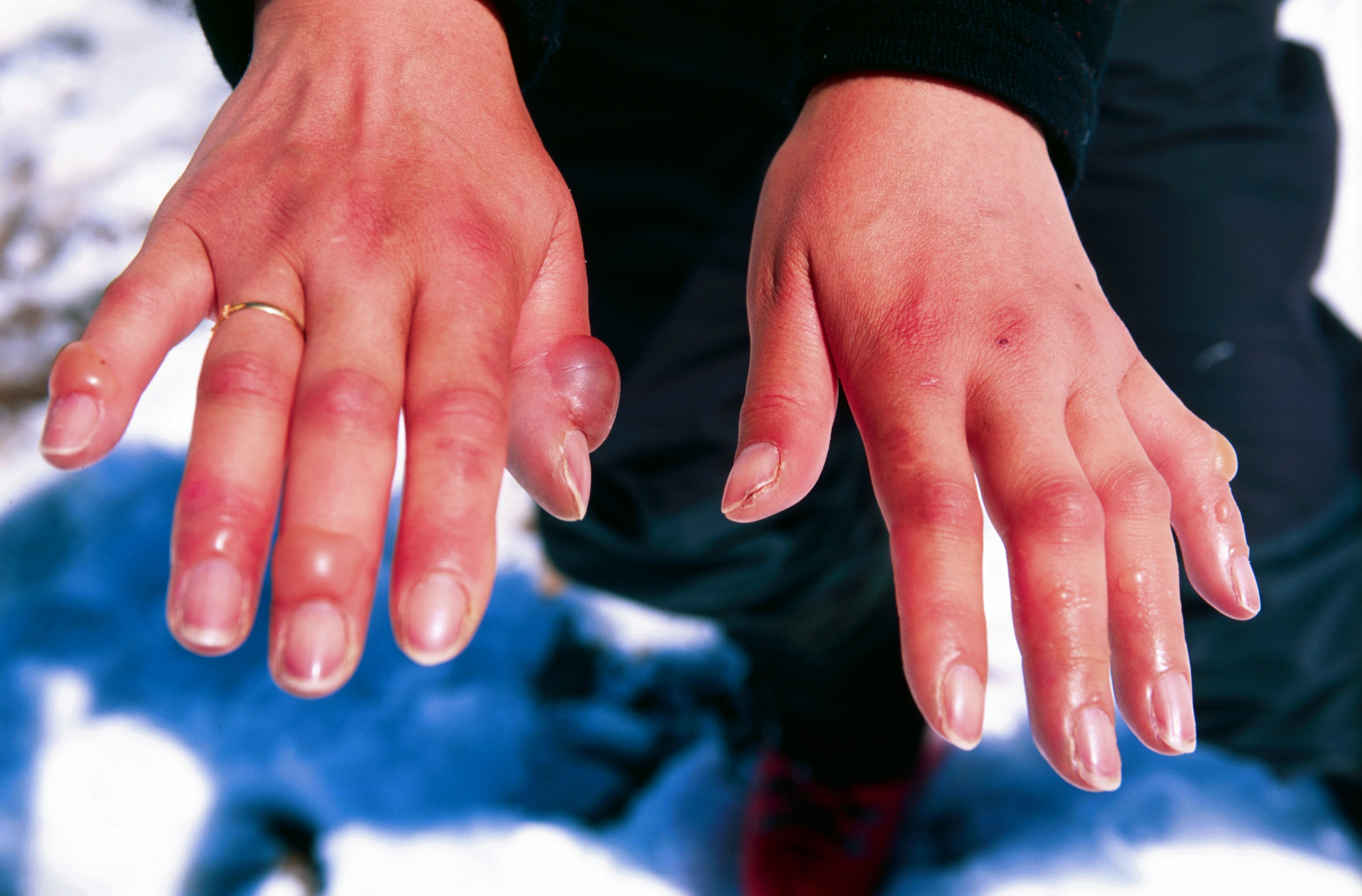
- Frostbitten fingers after descent from mountain climbing
- Specialty: Emergency medicine
- Symptoms: Numbness, skin discoloration, blisters, swelling, cold sensation
- Complications: Necrosis, gangrene, chronic pain, amputation
- Types: Freezing, nonfreezing
- Causes: Exposure to cold temperatures
- Risk factors: Military occupation, recreational winter activities, homelessness, inadequate or wet clothing, substance abuse, diabetes, peripheral vascular disease
- Diagnostic method: Based on symptoms
- Differential diagnosis: Hypothermia, Raynaud's phenomenon, chilblains (pernio), cold urticaria
- Prevention: Minimize cold exposure, wear protective clothing, change wet clothing, avoid substance use, maintain appropriate nutrition
- Treatment: Move to warm and dry environment, rewarming, medication, wound care, surgery

Cold injury (or cold weather injury) is damage to the body from cold exposure, including hypothermia and several skin injuries. Cold-related skin injuries are categorized into freezing and nonfreezing cold injuries. Freezing cold injuries involve tissue damage when exposed to temperatures below freezing (less than 0 degrees Celsius). Nonfreezing cold injuries involve tissue damage when exposed to temperatures often between 0-15 degrees Celsius for extended periods of time. While these injuries have disproportionally affected military members, recreational winter activities have also increased the risk and incidence within civilian populations. Additional risk factors include homelessness, inadequate or wet clothing, alcohol abuse or tobacco abuse, and pre-existing medical conditions that impair blood flow.

Freezing cold skin injuries include frostbite and frostnip. These injuries often affect the fingers, toes, nose, and ears since they are less commonly covered by clothing when in cold environments. Affected skin becomes numb, turns white or blue, and develops blisters. Frostnip is a superficial skin injury that won't freeze the skin or cause long-term damage. Frostbite involves freezing of fluids inside and outside of cells that results in cell breakdown, electrolyte imbalances, and inflammation. Surrounding blood vessel constriction and injury disrupts blood flow to affected tissue, which may cause tissue death (necrosis). Diagnosis is based on symptoms, but imaging can help assess viable tissue and risk of amputation. Pre-hospital treatment involves transfer to a warm environment, changing wet clothing, and rapid rewarming with warm water if refreezing is not expected. Hospital management involves rewarming, wound care, and medications to treat pain and possible blood clots. Amputation of unsalvageable tissue may be required weeks to months after initial injury.

Nonfreezing cold skin injuries include trench foot, a subclass of immersion foot caused by exposure to cold temperatures. These injuries often affect the feet after being subjected to wet cold for several hours or days. Affected individuals report a tingling or numbing sensation, red or blue discoloration, and swelling or blisters in affected skin. The mechanism of injury isn't fully understood, but may involve cold-induced damage to blood vessels and nerves that results in small blood vessel (capillary) destruction, swelling, and tissue necrosis. Diagnosis is based on symptoms. Pre-hospital treatment includes transfer to a warm environment and exchanging wet clothing. Hospital management includes gradual rewarming with air drying, elevating affected skin, and pain management.

== Freezing cold injuries ==
=== Epidemiology and risk factors ===
There is lacking comprehensive data on the overall incidence of freezing cold injuries, including frostbite. Military populations have been disproportionally affected due to prolonged cold exposure associated with work requirements. From 2015-2020, the United States military reported 1,120 frostbite cases. Increased incidence of cases have been noted in individuals who participate in winter recreational activities, especially mountaineering.

Several physical, behavioral, and environmental risk factors contribute to freezing cold injury cases. These include homelessness, inadequate clothing, high altitude, dehydration, and alcohol or tobacco abuse. Individuals with previous cold injury are at increased risk for another cold injury. Pre-existing medical conditions that compromise blood flow, such as diabetes, Raynaud syndrome, and peripheral vascular disease increase risk of injury.

=== Mechanism ===
Damage from freezing cold injury occurs through direct freezing of tissue, disrupted blood flow to affected skin, and rewarming injury. Freezing causes ice crystal formation in tissue that disrupts cell membranes and surrounding blood vessels. Electrolyte imbalances, tissue swelling (edema), and inflammation occur as intracellular contents enter surrounding tissue fluid. Constriction of blood vessels in response to freezing can cause tissue death (necrosis) in severe cases due to blood vessel blockage.

During the rewarming process, restored blood flow induces further inflammatory damage via formation of reactive oxygen species. This inflammation involves specific molecules (prostaglandins, thromboxanes, bradykinin, histamine) that cause edema and damage to blood vessels, leading to potential blood clot formation and interruption of blood flow.

=== Signs and symptoms ===
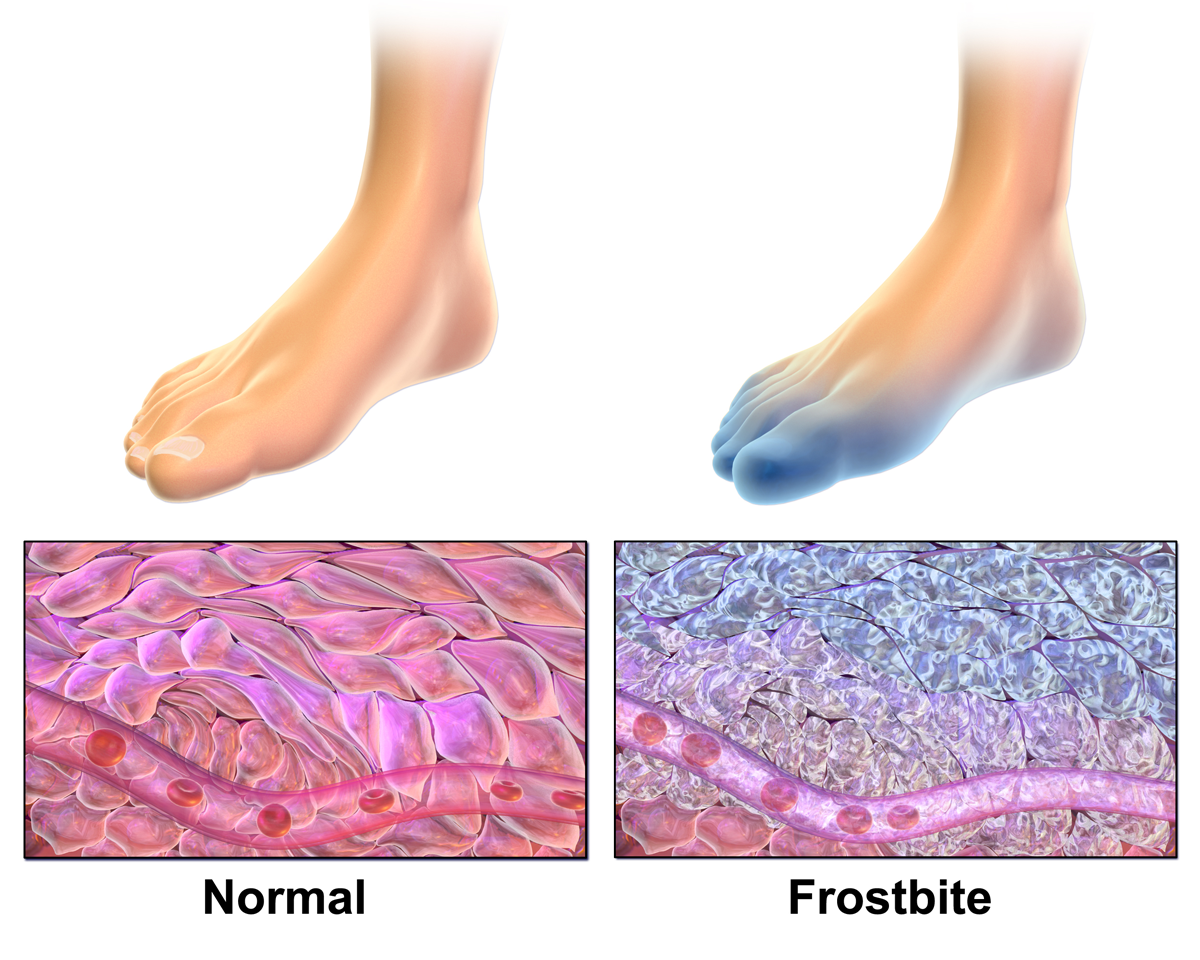
Frostbite

Areas that are usually affected include cheeks, ears, nose and fingers and toes. Frostbite is often preceded by frostnip. The symptoms of frostbite progress with prolonged exposure to cold. Historically, frostbite has been classified by degrees according to skin and sensation changes, similar to burn classifications. However, the degrees do not correspond to the amount of long-term damage. A simplification of this system of classification is superficial (first or second degree) or deep injury (third or fourth degree).

=== Diagnosis ===
Freezing cold injuries are diagnosed based on symptom presentation, but several weeks are often needed to determine the full extent of tissue injury. In suspected severe cases, magnetic resonance angiography (MRA) or Technetium-99 bone scan may be used after injury to determine the likelihood of tissue recovery and potential need for amputation. Bone scanning can help determine the ability to use tissue plasminogen activator (tPA) for breaking up associated blood clots.

In cases of suspected freezing cold injury, other cold-induced conditions should be evaluated and treated appropriately. These conditions may include:

Hypothermia: An accidental reduction of core body temperature to less than 35 degrees Celsius, most commonly due to cold environment exposure. Often presents as uncontrollable shivering that may progress to impaired consciousness and abnormal vital signs. Severe cases can cause cardiac arrest. Hypothermia should be treated first, if present, by bringing core body temperature above 35 degrees Celsius.

Raynaud's phenomenon: An abnormal spasming of blood vessels often in the tips of fingers and toes - usually in response to strong emotions or cold exposure. The digits will turn a white or blue color. This can be a primary disorder or secondary to an underlying medical condition.

=== Treatment ===
Affected individuals should be moved to a warm environment and have wet clothing removed and replaced. Rewarming should only be attempted when there is no risk of refreezing, as this would worsen tissue damage. Rewarming should not involve rubbing or massaging affected skin to avoid worsening the injury. Placing affected skin in an armpit, groin crease, or warm water bath are viable rewarming options. Aloe vera gel and NSAIDs can help reduce inflammation.

Choice of rewarming method depends on the suspected extent of skin injury and severity of hypothermia (if present). Passive rewarming techniques such as blankets may be sufficient for milder injuries. Active rewarming techniques such as warm intravenous fluids or warm water baths may be needed for more severe injuries. Rewarming should be continued until affected skin becomes red or purple in color and softens. Pain management with NSAIDs or opioids should be provided.

Topical Aloe vera gel should be applied to thawed tissue prior to dressing application. Clear or cloudy blisters may be drained with needle aspiration, but hemorrhagic blisters should be left intact. Consider antibiotics for severe injuries with potential tissue necrosis or gangrene. Tetanus toxoid should be administered based on local guidelines.

Using tissue plasminogen activator (tPA) within 24 hours of injury can both reduce tissue damage and increase amount of salvageable tissue by breaking up blood clots. This has led to a corresponding reduction of amputations in previous trials. Iloprost may be used to dilate blood vessels and decrease platelet aggregation when tPA is contraindicated or ineffective. Reducing clotting ability with streptokinase or heparin can reduce the risk of amputation.

Surgical treatment may include removal of dead/damaged tissue (debridement) or amputation and is usually performed several weeks after initial injury. Urgent surgery is needed when sepsis, severe infection, or wet gangrene is present. Fasciotomy may be required if compartment syndrome develops in the affected limb.

=== Prevention ===
Recommended preventative measures for freezing cold injuries include appropriate nutrition, wearing suitable clothing that covers one's skin, avoiding constrictive clothing, and ensuring access to warm shelter. Alcohol and other substance use should be discouraged.

=== Prognosis ===
Diagram of bones in the human hand

Long-term complications of freezing cold injury depend on the extent of tissue damage. Higher degrees of injury with firm skin after rewarming, hemorrhagic blisters, and tissue necrosis or gangrene carry a worse prognosis. In addition to possible amputation, several complications have been reported months or years after initial injury . These include chronic pain, increased sensitivity to cold, abnormal skin sensation, and arthritis. Long-term impaired circulation of blood flow and nerve damage have been attributed as possible causes.

==== Grades ====
Freezing cold injury on the hands and feet can be graded to estimate risk of amputation.

Grade 1: absence of bluish discoloration of skin (cyanosis); no risk of amputation or long-term complications

Grade 2: cyanosis on distal phalanges; possible amputation of fingertip/tip of toe and fingernail/toenail

Grade 3: cyanosis on intermediate and proximal phalanges; possible amputation to bone of digit with functional impairment

Grade 4: cyanosis over the carpal/tarsal bones; possible amputation to limb with functional impairment

== Nonfreezing cold injuries ==
=== Epidemiology and risk factors ===
Nonfreezing cold injuries occur in individuals with cold, wet skin for prolonged periods of time (several hours to days). These injuries have been characterized in military populations, who may be unable to frequently change their environmental surroundings or wet clothing. However, civilian populations with occupations that expose them to cold standing water, such as hikers, or that participate in winter recreational activities are also at risk. Additional risk factors include immobility, homelessness, alcohol or tobacco abuse, elderly age, dehydration, and underlying medical conditions such as peripheral vascular disease and diabetes.

=== Mechanism ===
The underlying mechanism of nonfreezing cold injury isn't fully understood, but has been characterized by poor blood flow into tissue exposed to cold, wet conditions. This may result in destruction of small blood vessels, which leads to swelling, nerve damage, and tissue breakdown due to pressure injury.

Distinction between acute and chronic mechanisms of nonfreezing cold injury has been discussed. Acute cases involve disruption of blood flow with breakdown of affected tissue and nerve damage. Chronic cases can occur after multiple episodes of acute injury, with partial restoration of blood flow but persistence of long-term symptoms.

=== Signs and symptoms ===
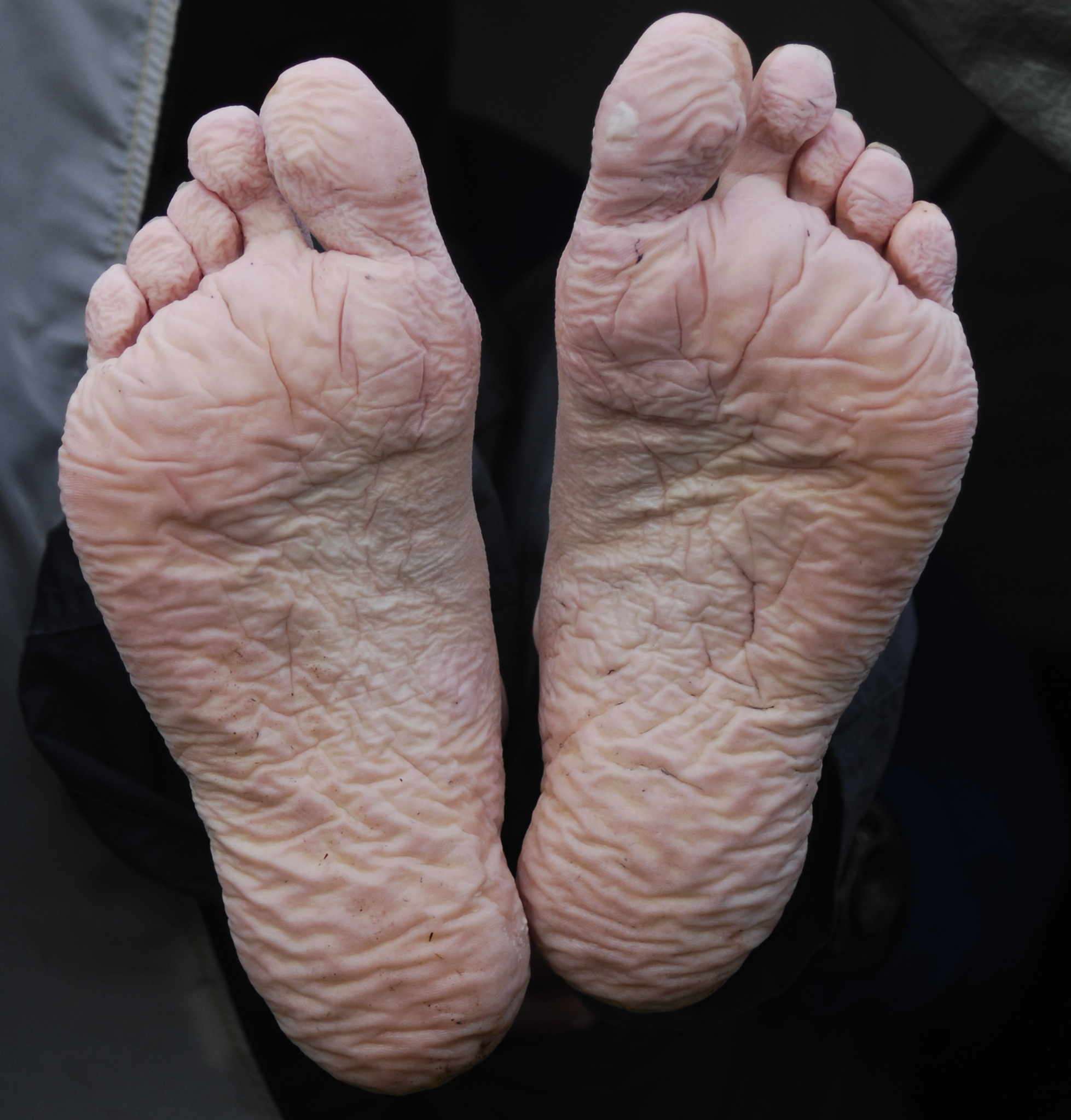
A mild case of trench foot

Nonfreezing cold injury commonly affects the feet due to prolonged exposure to wet socks or cold standing water. Symptoms progress through a series of four stages.

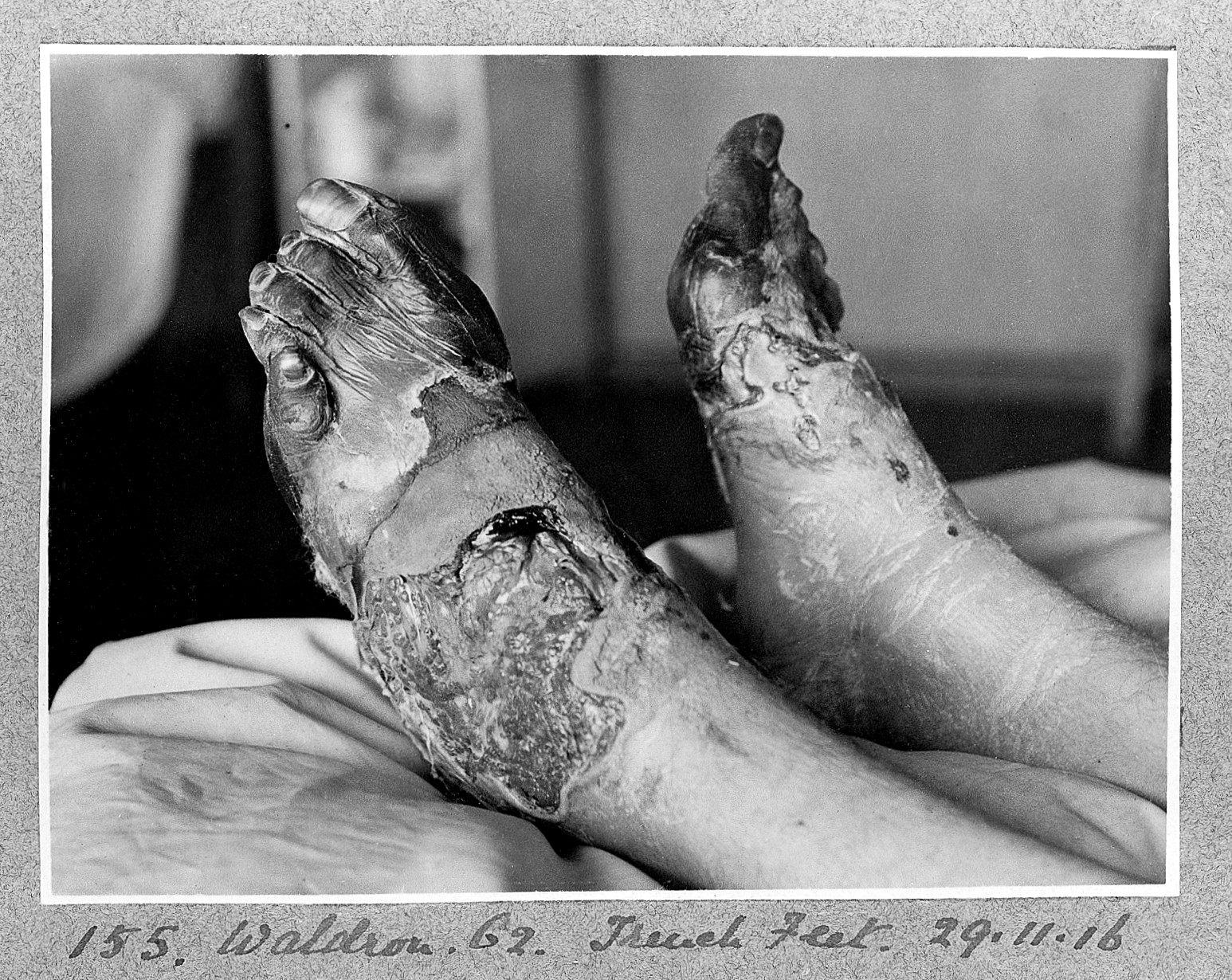
A severe case of trench foot

During cold exposure

- Affected skin becomes numb, which can cause a clumsy walking pattern (gait) if the feet are affected
- Skin transitions from red to a pale color depending on temperature of exposure

After cold exposure

- Symptoms can last from a few hours to a few days
- During rewarming, skin appears pale blue and continue to be cold, numb, and swollen

Increased blood flow to affected tissue (hyperemia)

- Symptoms can last from a few days to several weeks
- Affected limb becomes red and swollen with bounding pulses
- Numbness is replaced with increased sensitivity to pain
- Severely damaged tissue may develop blisters due to pressure injury or infection

After hyperemia

- Symptoms can last from a few weeks to several years
- Skin changes resolve (unless necrosis has occurred), but injured limb remains sensitive to cold

=== Diagnosis ===
Nonfreezing cold injury is diagnosed based on symptoms and history of prolonged exposure (usually 12 hours to 4 days) to cold moisture above freezing temperatures. Those affected report loss of sensation in affected skin for at least 30 minutes and abnormal sensation when experiencing rewarming. The use of imaging or lab testing specific to nonfreezing cold injury is not helpful for confirming the diagnosis. Imaging may be indicated to work up possible trauma or infection.

Other related cold-induced conditions include:

Chilblains (pernio): Inflammatory skin injury that can be caused by exposure to nonfreezing cold. Presents as red patches and plaques that resolve after a few weeks. Chronic cases have been reported in individuals with repeated cold exposure. Pernio-like skin lesions have also been associated with previous SARS-CoV-2 infection.

Cold urticaria: An allergic reaction that occurs when skin is exposed to cold stimuli. Lesions resemble hives (urticaria). This condition can occur secondary to certain infections and medications.

=== Treatment ===
Individuals with suspected nonfreezing cold injury should be moved to a warm, dry environment and have wet clothing swapped with dry replacements. Rewarming should be done gradually at room temperature with affected skin exposed to air and elevated above heart level. In contrast, rapid rewarming has been associated with worsening pain and tissue injury. Affected skin should not be rubbed or massaged to avoid further damage. Intravenous fluids should be warmed prior to infusion to reduce further heat loss.

Pain management should be achieved with amitriptyline, as NSAIDs and opioids are not as effective. Use of gabapentin and medications to dilate blood vessels (vasodilators) for pain control remains controversial.

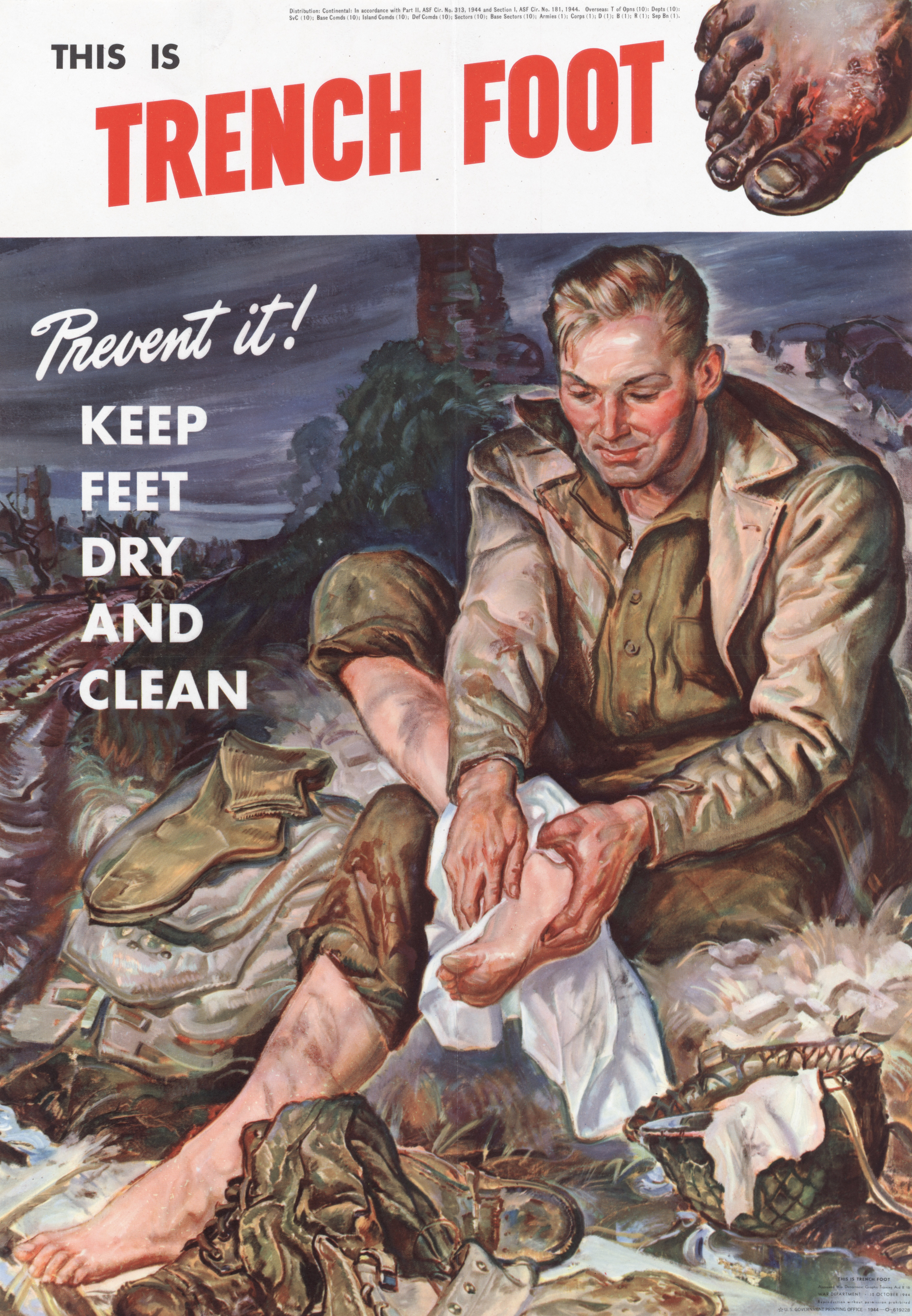
Flyer advocating for prevention of trench foot

Antibiotics usually aren't necessary, but should be started if infectious complications such as fungal infection or cellulitis occurs. If necrotic tissue is present, surgical debridement or amputation may be necessary.

=== Prevention ===
Recommended preventative measures include minimizing skin contact with wet cold, keeping clothing warm and dry, and elevating one's feet. Cotton clothing should be avoided in cold, wet environments as it retains moisture easily. In outdoor occupations, rotating personnel minimizes risk of prolonged cold exposure.

=== Prognosis ===
Most cases of nonfreezing cold injury resolve with minimal tissue loss, but some cases can be complicated by infection, nail loss, excess sweating (hyperhidrosis), and chronic pain or abnormal sensations in the affected skin. Injury to blood vessels and nerves in the affected skin with persistent constriction of blood vessels causes most long-term complications. Chronic pain is associated with increased risk of mental health conditions, including depression, suicidal ideation, and alcohol abuse.

== History ==
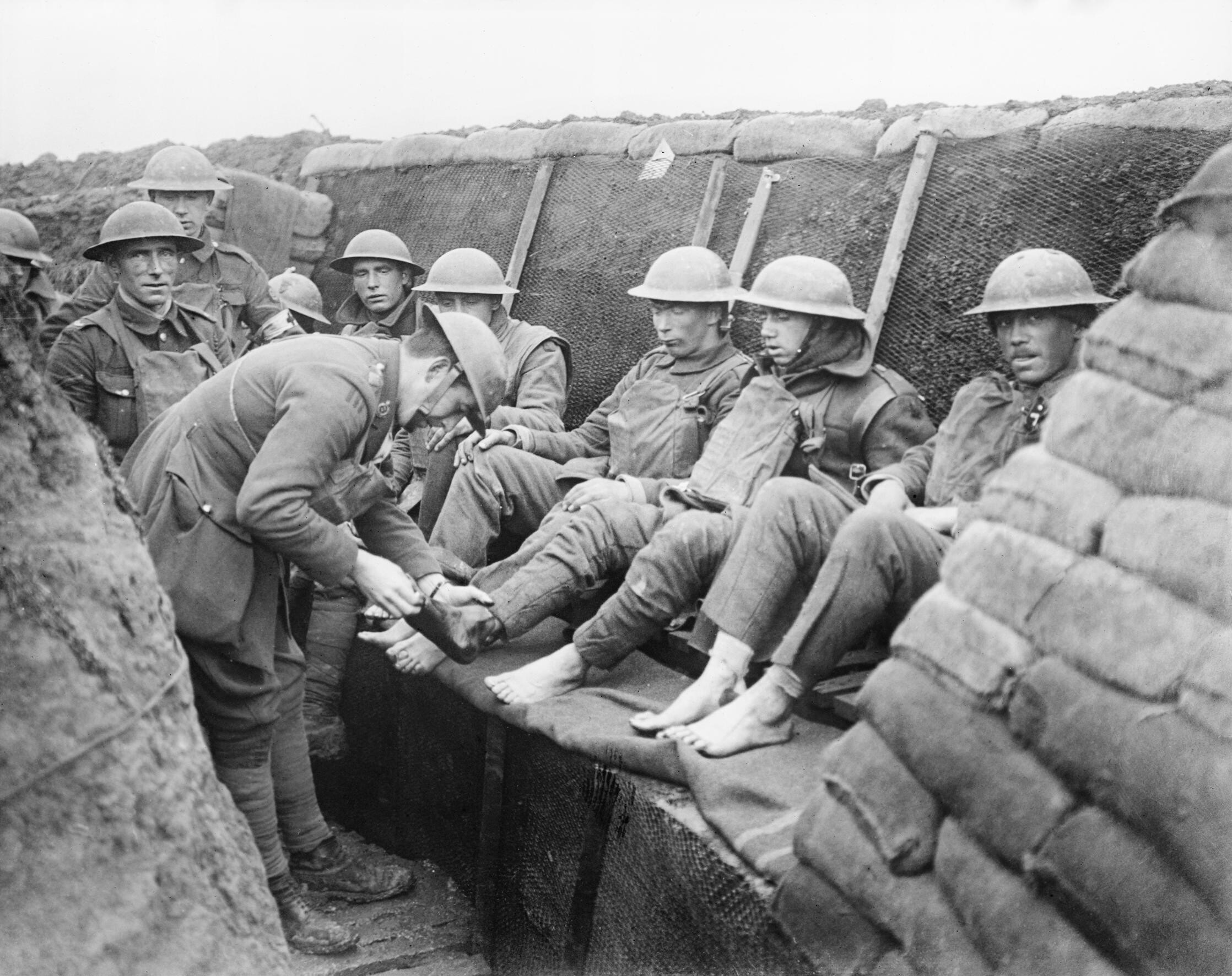
Medical officer conducting foot inspection in trench near Roclincourt, January 1918

Cold injuries have occurred for millennia, with the first documented case discovered in a 5000 year-old mummy within the Chilean mountains. The first mass instance of cold injury was notably documented by Baron Larrey during Napoleon's retreat from Russia in the winter of 1812-1813. These injuries also plagued thousands of soldiers during World War I and II. Trench foot is thought to have contributed up to 75,000 deaths among British soldiers during World War I, with the condition obtaining its name from its association with trench warfare. Over 25,000 cases of trench foot were reported among US military during World War II. Preventative measures such as rotating trench positions, changing socks multiple times per day, and using whale oil on one's feet were introduced to reduce incidence of cases. Cold skin injuries are still prominent in the modern era, with 1,120 cases of frostbite and 590 cases of trench foot reported in the US military from 2015-2020.
