= Thermal balance of the underwater diver =

Conditions in which the temperature of a diver can remain stable

Thermal balance of a diver occurs when the total heat exchanged between the diver and their surroundings results in a stable temperature of the diver. Ideally this is within the range of normal human body temperature. Thermal status of the diver is the temperature distribution and heat balance of the diver. The terms are frequently used as synonyms. Thermoregulation is the process by which an organism keeps its body temperature within specific bounds, even when the surrounding temperature is significantly different. The internal thermoregulation process is one aspect of homeostasis: a state of dynamic stability in an organism's internal conditions, maintained far from thermal equilibrium with its environment. If the body is unable to maintain a normal human body temperature and it increases significantly above normal, a condition known as hyperthermia occurs. The opposite condition, when body temperature decreases below normal levels, is known as hypothermia. It occurs when the body loses heat faster than producing it. The core temperature of the human body normally remains steady at around 36.5–37.5 °C (97.7–99.5 °F). Only a small amount of hypothermia or hyperthermia can be tolerated before the condition becomes debilitating, further deviation can be fatal. Hypothermia does not easily occur in a diver with reasonable passive thermal insulation over a moderate exposure period, even in very cold water.

Body heat is lost by respiratory heat loss, by heating and humidifying (latent heat) inspired gas, and by body surface heat loss, by radiation, conduction, and convection, to the atmosphere, water, and other substances in the immediate surroundings. Surface heat loss may be reduced by insulation of the body surface. Heat is produced internally by metabolic processes and may be supplied from external sources by active heating of the body surface or the breathing gas. Radiation heat loss is usually trivial due to small temperature differences, conduction and convection are the major components. Evaporative heat load is also significant to open circuit divers, not so much for rebreathers.

Heat transfer to and via gases at higher pressure than atmospheric is increased due to the higher density of the gas at higher pressure which increases its heat capacity. This effect is also modified by changes in breathing gas composition necessary for reducing narcosis and work of breathing, to limit oxygen toxicity and to accelerate decompression. Heat loss through conduction is faster for higher fractions of helium. Divers in a helium based saturation habitat will lose or gain heat fast if the gas temperature is too low or too high, both via the skin and breathing, and therefore the tolerable temperature range is smaller than for the same gas at normal atmospheric pressure. The heat loss situation is very different in the saturation living areas, which are temperature and humidity controlled, in the dry bell, and in the water.

The alveoli of the lungs are very effective at heat and humidity transfer. Inspired gas that reaches them is heated to core body temperature and humidified to saturation in the time needed for gas exchange, regardless of the initial temperature and humidity. This heat and humidity are lost to the environment in open circuit breathing systems. Breathing gas that only gets as far as the physiological dead space is not heated so effectively. When heat loss exceeds heat generation, body temperature will fall. Exertion increases heat production by metabolic processes, but when breathing gas is cold and dense, heat loss due to the increased volume of gas breathed to support these metabolic processes can result in a net loss of heat, even if the heat loss through the skin is minimised.

The thermal status of the diver has a significant influence on decompression stress and risk, and from a safety point of view this is more important than thermal comfort. Ingassing while warm is faster than when cold, as is outgassing, due to differences in perfusion in response to temperature perception, which is mostly sensed in superficial tissues. Maintaining warmth for comfort during the ingassing phase of a dive can cause relatively high tissue gas loading, and getting cold during decompression can slow the elimination of gas due to reduced perfusion of the chilled tissues, and possibly also due to the higher solubility of the gas in chilled tissues. Thermal stress also affects attention and decision making, and local chilling of the hands reduces strength and dexterity.

== Chilling ==
Core temperature reduction will eventually result in hypothermia, but even lesser temperature drops will cause reduced physical and mental capacity. Peripheral chilling generally causes vasoconstriction, which slows the rate of ingassing and outgassing (washout) in those tissues. This affects the risk of decompression sickness in surface oriented diving and saturation diving excursions from storage depth with significant depth change.

Hand temperature reduction below 15 °C (59 °F) results in loss of hand and finger strength and dexterity which can make the diver unable to perform necessary tasks, or delay getting them done, which can reduce their ability to recover from dangerous incidents, and increase risk of injury or fatality. Maintaining core temperature of the body does not preserve hand temperature or perfusion when the hands are exposed to cold water, even when passive insulation of the hands is provided. In sufficiently cold water, non-freezing cold injury is possible.

Hypothermia is reduced core body temperature that happens when a body dissipates more heat than it absorbs and produces for long enough. Clinical hypothermia occurs when the core temperature drops below 35 °C (95 °F), though the American Heart Association uses 36 °C (97 °F). Heat loss is a major limitation to swimming or diving in cold water. The reduction in finger dexterity due to pain or numbness decreases general safety and work capacity, which consequently increases the risk of other injuries. Reduced capacity for rational decision making increases risk due to other hazards, and loss of strength in chilled muscles also affects the capacity to manage both routine and emergency situations. Low tissue temperatures and reduced peripheral perfusion affect inert gas solubility and the rate of ingassing and outgassing, thereby affecting decompression stress and risk. Body heat is lost much more quickly in water than in air, so water temperatures that would be quite reasonable as outdoor air temperatures can lead to severe chilling, and eventually hypothermia in inadequately protected divers, although it is not often the direct clinical cause of death.

Most divers are sufficiently protected by their diving suits that clinical hypothermia is rare for scuba divers, but it is considered a significant hazard for surface supplied saturation divers, largely due to core heat loss to the breathing gas at depths where the gas density causes high thermal capacity of the gas. Head loss to the breathing gas is slightly reduced by helium content of the breathing gas, as although it has greater thermal conductivity, its heat capacity is lower than nitrogen.

According to Pollock (2023) the unprotected adult human takes somewhere in the order of 30 minutes to become hypothermic in near freezing water. This is because core heat loss is significantly retarded by peripheral vasoconstriction. This period will be greatly extended by even a damaged diving suit, which will reduce convective heat loss, without reducing vasoconstriction. The diver will feel cold, and the peripheral tissues will chill, possibly to the extent of marked loss of strength and dexterity, but the core temperature will drop relatively slowly, and may take much longer than 30 minutes to drop below 35 °C (95 °F). The diver is cold and uncomfortable, but not hypothermic, and there is no immediate risk to life as long as the diver can still function competently and make good decisions.

In freediving, the physiological responses to cold are more marked, and may be seen as part of the diving reflex. breathhold after inspiration increases intrathoracic pressure. This triggers baroreceptors and cardiac stretch receptors which in turn trigger parasympathetic nervous system (PNS) responses. Breathing in preparation for apnoea causes a drop in blood carbon dioxide and lactate increase causes carotid chemoreceptors to activate the PNS and lower heart rate. Splenic contraction frees more red blood cells carrying oxygen into the circulation, and myoglobin, neuroglobin and cytoglobin oxygen stores become available.

== Overheating ==
In humans, hyperthermia is defined as a temperature greater than 37.5–38.3 °C (99.5–100.9 °F), depending on the reference used, that occurs without a change in the body's temperature set point. The normal human body temperature can be as high as 37.7 °C (99.9 °F). Hyperthermia requires an elevation from the temperature that would otherwise be expected. Such elevations range from mild to extreme; body temperatures above 40 °C (104 °F) can be life-threatening.

Overheating of divers is much less common than excessive heat loss, but there are situations where commercial divers must dive in relatively hot water, where the diver will be heated by the diving medium. In these cases it is necessary for the diver to be actively chilled, as insulation alone cannot reduce the temperature of the diver. Sweating is the mechanism normally used to cool the body when the temperature rises above 37 °C (99 °F), but it is ineffective in water, as the sweat cannot evaporate, and in a dry suit the internal gas as saturated in a very short time, after which no further evaporation can occur. A system using vests chilled with ice has been tested successfully, and tubesuits chilled with water at 30 °C (86 °F) have been tested in ambient water temperatures of up to 40 °C (104 °F). Cold breathing gas can help cool the diver, and preventing the gas supply from being heated by the ambient water may be useful. The peripheral blood vessels will dilate when body temperature is high, as this promotes sweating, the normal reaction to overheating. In the absence of evaporative cooling the increased perfusion will increase heat transfer to the core. As in the case of excessive heat loss, effective insulation of the diver inside a chilled suit will minimise the cooling load. The effects of hyperthermia on diver performance and physiology are incompletely understood, particularly during exercise. Stand-by divers using dry suits should be monitored for heat stress when the temperature is above 70 °F (21 °C).

== Thermal management ==
The thermally neutral air temperature for an unprotected resting human is about 28 °C (82 °F), and the thermally neutral temperature in water is about 35 °C (95 °F), much closer to normal body temperature. This difference is due to the very different physical properties of the media. If the metabolic rate is raised, these ambient temperatures will become uncomfortably high.

=== Thermally neutral temperatures ===
The thermoneutral zone (TNZ) is the range of temperatures of the immediate environment in which a standard healthy adult can maintain normal body temperature without needing to use energy above and beyond normal basal metabolic rate. It starts at approximately 21 °C (69.8 °F) for normal weight men and at around 18 °C (64.4 °F) for those who are overweight, and extends towards circa 30 °C (86.0 °F). This is for a resting human and does not allow for shivering, sweating or exercising. Vasomotor control is the only regulatory mechanism in the thermoneutral zone. Even with light clothing, radiation and convection losses are dramatically reduced, effectively reducing the TNZ. Below the lower critical temperature of the TNZ heat balance can be maintained by increase in metabolic heat production, including shivering, but above the upper critical temperature, the normal mechanism of evaporative cooling by sweating is not available to divers in the water. Water is a far more effective heat source and sink than air and the TNZ is correspondingly narrower and shifted upwards to 33 to 35.5 °C (91.4 to 95.9 °F). In hyperbaric environments the higher gas density, and in the case of helium based gases, higher conductivity, also cause a narrower TNZ.

The thermal comfort zone (TCZ) is the range of temperatures in which a perception of comfort is experienced, and which are regulated by behaviour.

The temperature in saturation living quarters must be kept high enough to prevent excessive heat loss via the high thermal capacity and high thermal conductivity of the high density heliox atmosphere, and low enough to allow sufficient cooling. typically in the rather narrow range from 85 to 93 °F (29 to 34 °C), depending on the storage pressure. The relative humidity should be low enough to allow effective evaporative cooling.

The higher rate of heat transfer in water means that for an uninsulated person, the heat loss due to increased movement and the consequent increased convection, is not compensated by the additional metabolic heat output, and after a short period, a swimmer will lose heat more quickly than a person remaining still relative to the water. In practice, some movement may be essential to avoid drowning. When well enough insulated, this tendency will reverse, and exercise will increase body heat faster than it is lost, as is the case with an adequate diving suit.

The insulation provided by surface tissues is mainly dependent on perfusion of those tissues. Reduction of perfusion due to vasoconstriction is a natural response to cold sensation by the skin. High levels of carbon dioxide are a vasodilator, which will counter this vasoconstriction. Not only will heat be lost more quickly, but higher perfusion will cause a faster tissue loading by inert gas when at depth, though the saturation level may not be as high due to solubility changes. Elevated carbon dioxide levels can also increase ventilation, which can contribute to heat loss when the breathing gas is dense and cold.

=== Factors affecting the thermal status of the diver ===
- Temperature and convection of the surrounding medium: Ambient temperature of the water during the dive, and air temperature before and after the dive.
- Wind chill. Increased convective cooling by ambient air
- Evaporative cooling in air
- Breathing gas temperature, density, specific heat, and respiratory minute volume (RMV).
- Insolation when out of the water in sunshine. This is affected by the radiant heat absorption of the diving suit.
- Thermal insulation reduces the rate of heat transfer in both directions.
- Basal metabolism produces heat. This may be increased by exercise and shivering, as the energy provided by metabolic processes to perform work, also generates heat.
- Active heating, the use of electrical heating elements in undergarments, heat packs, or hot water circulation in an open or closed circuit in the diving suit. and heating of the breathing gas supply.
- Active cooling. In some circumstances the diving environment is too hot for comfort or health and cooling is required. The pre-dive environment can also be too hot, and require cooling, but this is usually relatively simple and can generally be achieved by wetting the outside of the suit for evaporative cooling, and seating the standby diver in shade.

== Heat loss ==
The rate of heat loss from the human body is a function of subcutaneous fat thickness, but metabolic heat production is not accurately predictable, which is a limitation on predicting the lowest water temperature in which a stable thermal balance can be reached, with or without a given external insulation.

The individual metabolic response to a cold environment depends to some degree on the distribution of skin temperature, but also by other factors, including physical fitness and conditioning by prior exposure to low temperatures.

Immersion in water at 29 °C (84 °F) has been found to not stimulate much metabolic response. Consequently, there is little peripheral vasoconstriction or shivering, which allows faster core cooling, which may progress to approximately 35 °C (95 °F), a temperature at which temporary but serious intellectual impairment occurs, and which is thought to have been a significant factor in some accidents during deep dives using hot water suits. These low core temperatures are not associated with much sensation of cold. The lower limit of safe core temperature for potentially dangerous and complex work can therefore be assumed to be higher than the nominal hypothermia limit of 35 °C (95 °F)

Heat loss from the head has been measured at temperatures from 32°C to -21°C and was found to be close to linearly related to the temperature. Insulation of the head appears to be almost unaffected by the ambient temperature. In compariton with a finger, where there was strong vasodilarion and vasoconstriction with variations in ambient temperature, the head showed little vasoconstriction at lowered temperature, and slight vasodilation at higher temperatures near 30°C:

When the rest of the body is well insulated, the exposed head and face can account for a large part of total body heat loss. When the whole body is immersed in water, it is about 10% of total heat loss, and body temperature can be selectively influenced by cooling of the head and face.

=== Breathing gas temperature ===
Inhaled gas is heated to nearly 37 °C (99 °F) and humidified to saturation before it reaches the alveoli, and this humidification requires both additional heat and water. Some of the heat is recovered during exhalation, but there is a net heat loss in most circumstances as the gas is usually relatively cold and dry, particularly open circuit scuba gas which has an extremely low humidity, and temperature commonly below 0 °C (32 °F) at the mouth. Increased gas density due to depth increases this heat loss. Different gas composition also affects heat loss as gases have different specific heats. In this regard, helium based gases have lower specific heat for a given pressure and remove less heat for a given RMV and depth.

Cold breathing gas also causes an increase in airway resistance as it induces contraction of smooth muscles of the airways. Heating of the inspired gas by hot water jacket on the helmet, for surface-supplied divers, or retaining the heat in a rebreather loop reduces this effect and also reduces heat loss. The gas in the rebreather loop is also fully saturated most of the time, reducing heat loss by evaporation. Gas in the rebreather loop will lose heat to the surrounding water, but the temperature of loop gas will always be higher than the water, while open circuit scuba gas will always be colder than the water due to adiabatic cooling in the regulator stages. Open circuit gas is warmed by the surrounding water.

=== Insulation ===
Insulation of the diver is the primary function of most types of diving suit. The two main classes of ambient pressure diving suit are wetsuits and dry suits. Both are effective, but dry suits have a wider range of temperatures in which they are sufficiently effective than wetsuits.

==== Wetsuits ====
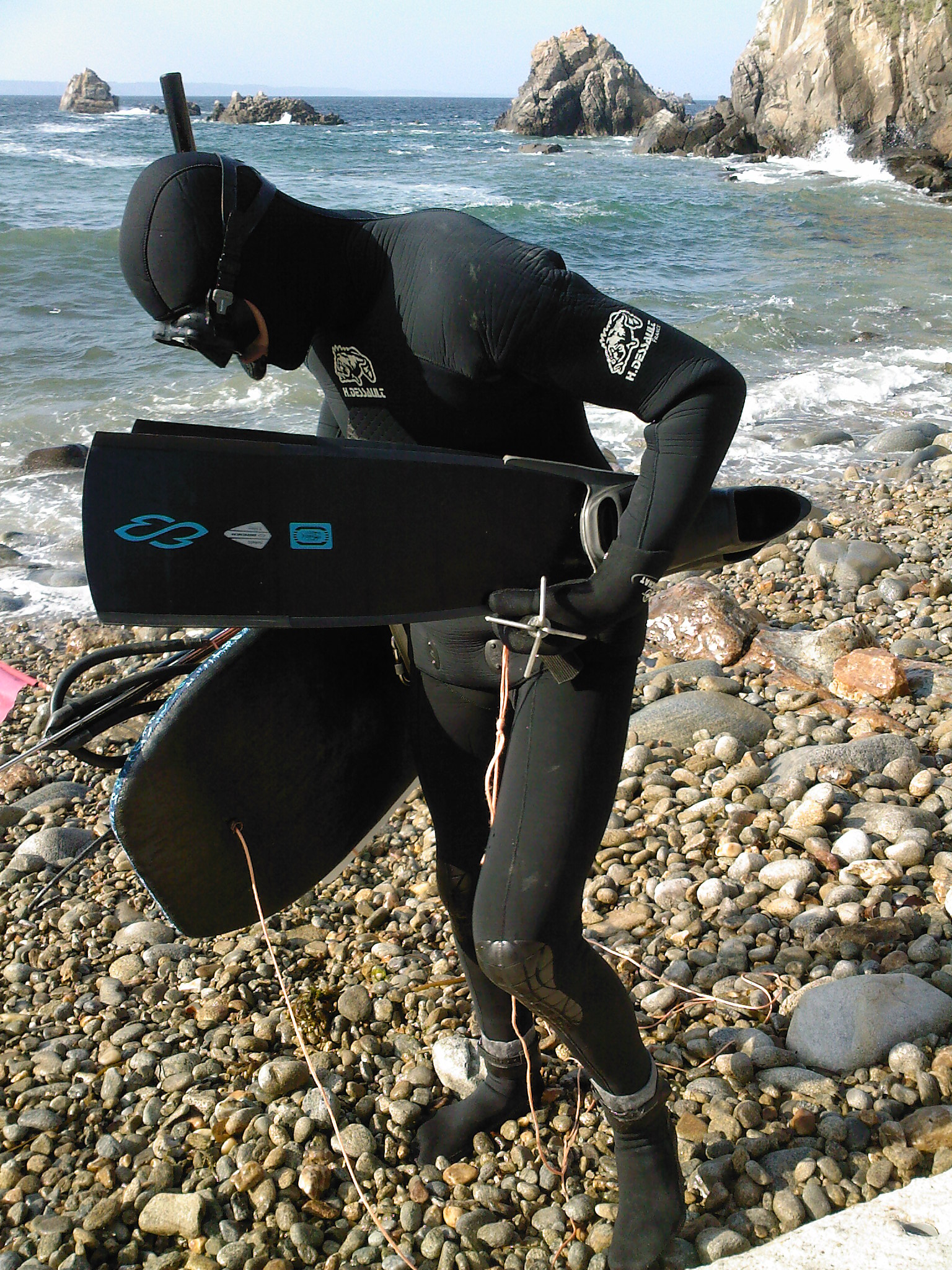
Spearfisher in wet suit

Wetsuits are close-fitting flexible suits that are typically used where the water temperature is between 10 and 25 °C (50 and 77 °F). The foamed neoprene of the suit thermally insulates the wearer. Although water can enter the suit, a well fitted suit prevents excessive heat loss because little of the water warmed inside the suit escapes from the suit to be replaced by cold water, a process referred to as "flushing".

Proper fit is critical for heat retention. A suit that is too loose will allow a large amount of water to circulate over the diver's skin, taking up body heat, and this water can be expelled from the suit by body movement, to be replaced by cold water. A suit that is too tight is very uncomfortable and can impair breathing and circulation at the neck, a dangerous condition which can cause blackouts. Off the rack suits may not be available to suit the shape and size of some people, so many divers choose to have wetsuits custom-tailored instead of buying them "off the rack". Many suppliers offer this service and the cost is generally more, but may be similar to an off-the-rack suit.

Wetsuits are limited in their ability to retain heat by three factors: the wearer is still exposed to some water, the suit is compressed by the ambient pressure, reducing effectiveness at depth, and the insulating neoprene can only be made to a certain thickness before it becomes impractical to don and wear. The thickest commercially available wetsuits are usually 10 mm thick. Other common thicknesses are 7 mm, 5 mm, 3 mm, and 1 mm. A 1 mm suit provides very little warmth and is usually considered a dive skin, rather than a wetsuit. Wetsuits can be made using more than one thickness of neoprene, to put the most thickness where it will be most effective in keeping the diver warm. A similar effect can be achieved by layering wetsuits of different coverage. Some makes of neoprene are softer, lighter and more compressible than others for the same thickness, and will compress and lose their insulating value more quickly under pressure, though they are more comfortable because they are more flexible and allow more freedom of movement.

==== Semi-dry suits ====
Semi-dry suits are effectively wetsuits with watertight seams and nearly watertight seals at wrist, neck, ankles and zip. They are typically used where the water temperature is between 10 and 20 °C (50 and 68 °F). The seals limit the volume of water entering and leaving the suit, and a close fit minimises pumping action caused by limb motion. The wearer gets wet in a semi-dry suit but the water that enters is soon warmed up and does not readily leave the suit, so the wearer remains relatively warm. The trapped layer of water does not add to the suit's insulating ability, and any water circulation past the seals still causes heat loss, but semi-dry suits are cheap and simple to use compared to dry suits, and do not fail catastrophically. They are usually made from thick expanded neoprene, which provides good thermal protection, but lose buoyancy and thermal protection as the trapped gas bubbles in the neoprene foam compress at depth. Semi-dry suits are usually made as a one piece full suit with neoprene wrist, cuff and neck seals having a slick sealing surface in contact with the skin. Two-piece sets tend to be a one piece full length suit, sometimes described as "long johns", plus accessories to be worn over, under or with the one-piece suit, such as a shortie tunic, which may be worn separately in warm water, but has no flush-limiting seals at the openings. Semi dry suits do not usually include hoods, boots or gloves, so separate insulating hoods, boots and gloves are worn.

==== Dry suits ====
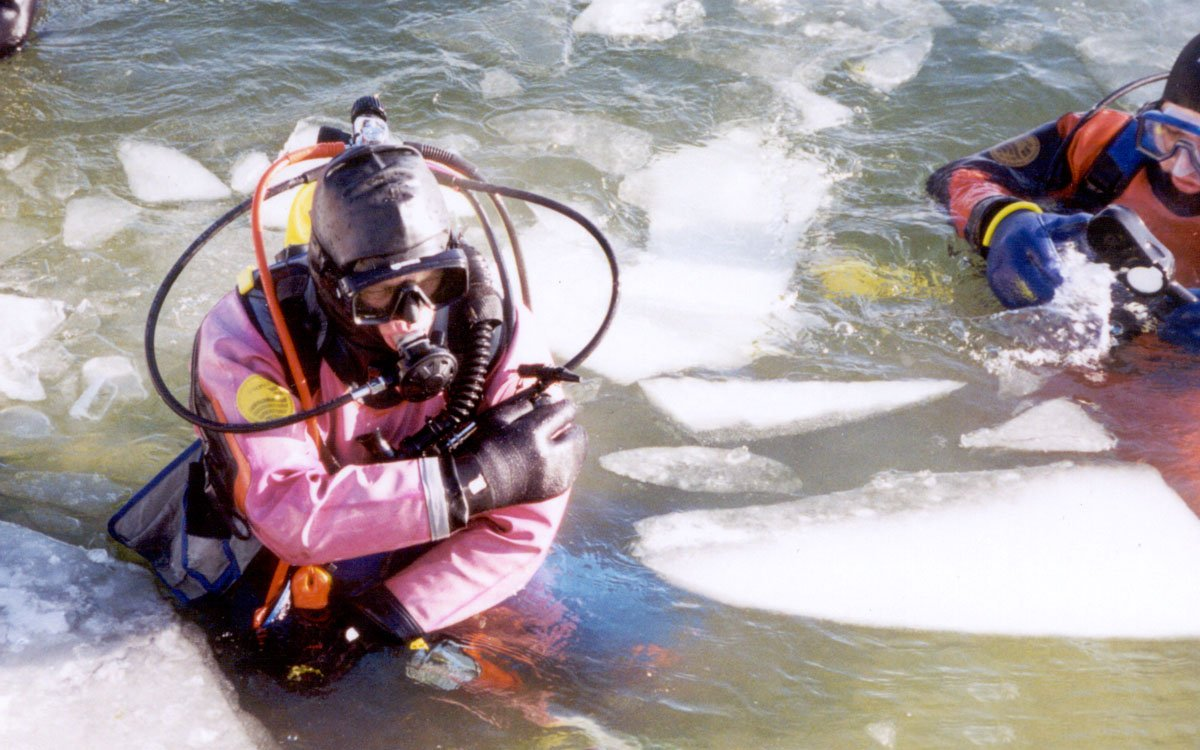
Dry suit in icy water

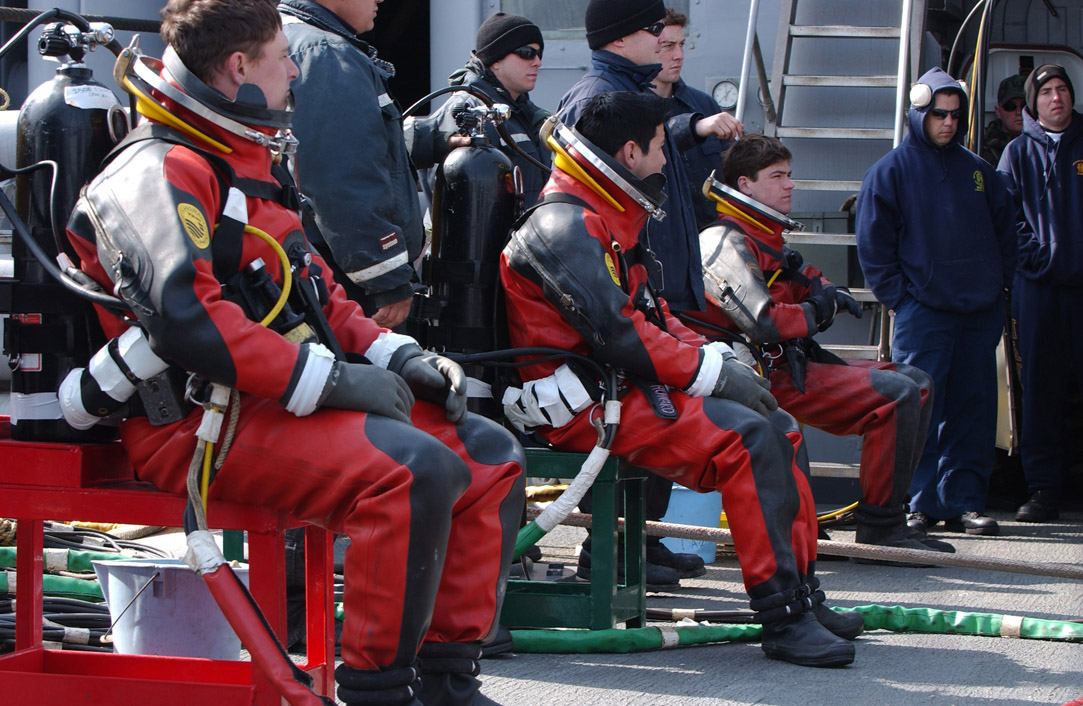
U.S. Navy divers prepare to dive in dry suits

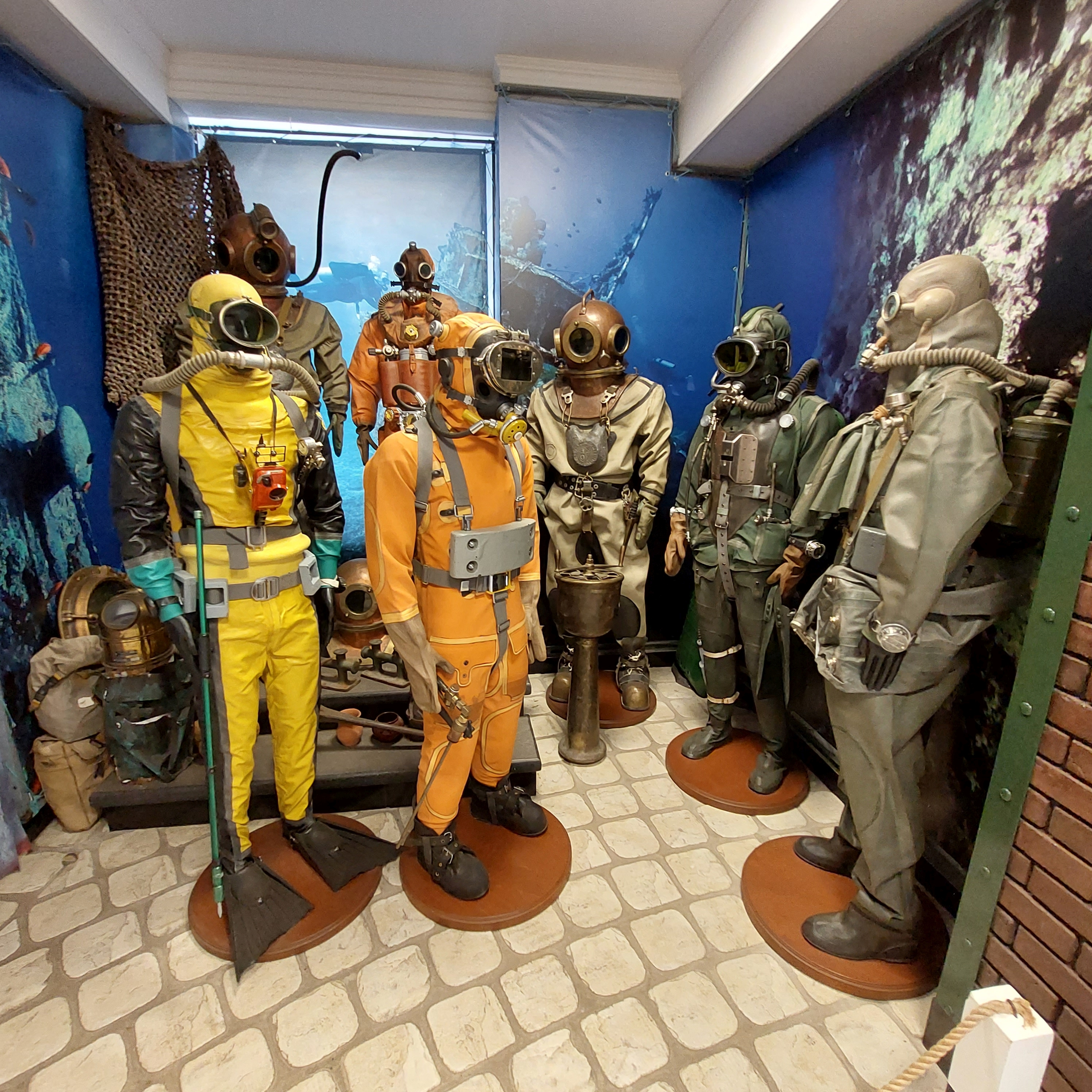
A museum display of diving dry suits with different breathing apparatus configurations

Dry suits are generally used where the water temperature is between −2 and 15 °C (28 and 59 °F). Water is prevented from entering the waterproof shell of the suit by seals at the neck and wrists and the opening for getting the suit on and off is typically closed by a waterproof zipper. The suit insulates the wearer by maintaining a layer of gas in the undersuit between the body and the suit shell, (in the same way that thermal insulation garments work above water) or by using a watertight expanded neoprene suit shell, which is inherently insulating in the same way as a wet suit, and which can usually be worn with additional insulating undergarments.

Both laminated fabric and neoprene drysuits have advantages and disadvantages: a laminated fabric drysuit is more adaptable to varied water temperatures because different garments can be layered underneath. However, they are quite bulky to be loose enough to allow freedom of movement and access for the feet through the legs, and this causes increased drag and swimming effort. The woven materials are relatively inelastic and constrain joint mobility unless inflated to a fairly loose fit. Additionally, if a fabric dry suit malfunctions and floods, it loses most of its insulating properties, though convection is still limited. Neoprene drysuits are comparatively streamlined like wetsuits and are more elastic, but in some cases do not allow garments to be layered underneath and are thus less adaptable to varying temperatures. An advantage of expanded neoprene construction is that even it if floods completely, it essentially becomes a wetsuit and will still provide a significant amount of insulation.

Layering of undergarments influences comfort and insulation. A wicking layer against the skin keeps trapped moisture off the skin and reduces conductive heat transfer. The main insulation function is reducing heat conduction by gas spaces in the thickness of the undergarment, and minimising convection in the insulating layers. There is a tradeoff between limiting gas flow through the insulating garment to minimise convective heat transfer and allowing easy venting of excess gas in the suit. A stable loft will allow adequate gas flow around the undergarments for rapid venting and equalisation, but maintain a fairly constant thickness of the undergarments for insulation. Thickness of insulation is of greatest value in the areas where heat loss from the skin is greatest.

Constant volume dry suits have a system allowing the suit to be inflated to prevent "suit squeeze" caused by increasing pressure and to prevent excessive compression of the insulating undergarments. They also have vents allowing the excess gas to escape from the suit during ascent.

For improved insulation, dry suit users may inflate their suits with argon, an inert gas which has superior thermal insulating properties compared to air and helium. The argon is carried in a small cylinder, separate from the diver's breathing gas. This arrangement is frequently used when the breathing gas contains helium, which is a very poor insulator in comparison with other breathing gases. Argon has 32% lower thermal conductivity than air, but does not always make a significant difference to core temperature or perceived thermal comfort in comparison with air. To be fully effective, the air in the suit must be flushed out with argon.

=== Active heating and cooling ===
Active heating and cooling uses an artificial heat source or sink to heat or remove excess heat from the diver. A diver can be kept in comfort and thermal equilibrium in a tubesuit garment while immersed in water from 10 to 40 °C (50 to 104 °F), using a flow of water at 30 °C (86 °F). Available technology includes closed and open circuit water circulation, electrical heating elements worn inside the diving suit, and chemical heating and cooing packs. Active heating and cooling is often used in conjunction with passive insulation, and usually when passive insulation is inadequate or inconvenient, or insufficiently adaptable to variable conditions during a planned dive.

==== Hot water suits ====
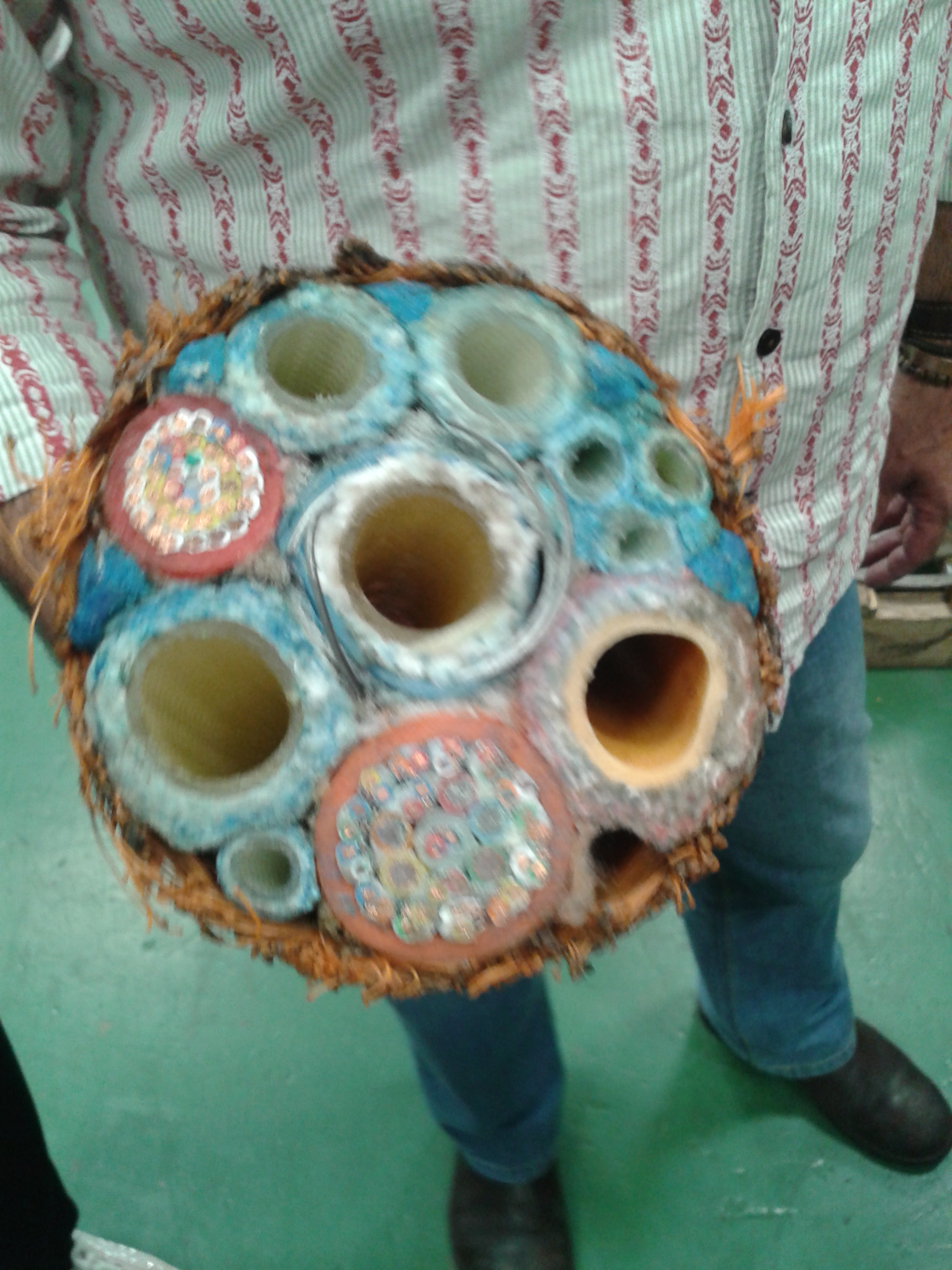
Bell umbilical section, containing among other components, hot water supply hoses.

Hot water suits are loose fitting neoprene wetsuits used in cold water commercial surface-supplied diving. A hose in the diver's umbilical line, which links the diver to the surface support, carries the hot water from a heater at the surface down to the suit. The diver controls the flow rate of the water from a valve near his waist, allowing him to vary the warmth of the suit in response to changes in environmental conditions and workload. Tubes inside the suit distribute the water to the limbs, chest, and back. Special boots, gloves, and hood are worn to extend heating to the extremities. Breathing gas heating at the helmet is available by using a hot water shroud over the helmet inlet piping between the valve block and the regulator. These suits are normally made of foamed neoprene and are similar to wetsuits in construction and appearance, but they do not fit as closely by design, and need not be very thick, as their primary function is to temporarily retain and guide the flow of the heating water. The wrists and ankles of the suit are open, allowing water to flush out of the suit as it is replenished with fresh hot water from the surface.

Hot water suits are often used for deep dives when breathing mixes containing helium are used. Helium conducts heat much more efficiently than air, which means that the diver will lose large quantities of body heat through the lungs when breathing it. This compounds the risk of hypothermia already present in the cold temperatures found at these depths. Under these conditions a hot water suit is a matter of survival, not comfort. Loss of heated water supply for hot water suits can be a life-threatening emergency with a high risk of debilitating hypothermia. Just as an emergency backup source of breathing gas is required, a backup water heater is also an essential precaution whenever dive conditions warrant a hot water suit. If the heater fails and a backup unit cannot be immediately brought online, a diver in the coldest conditions can die within minutes. Depending on decompression obligations, bringing the diver directly to the surface could prove equally deadly, particularly as decompression efficiency is reduced by a drop in body temperature.

Heated water in the suit forms an active insulation barrier to heat loss, but the temperature must be regulated within fairly close limits. If the temperature falls below about 32 °C, hypothermia can result, and temperatures above 45 °C can cause burn injury to the diver. The diver may not notice a gradual change in inlet temperature, and in the early stages of hypo- or hyperthermia, may not notice the deteriorating condition. When controlled correctly, the hot water suit is safe, comfortable and effective, and allows the diver adequate control of thermal protection, however hot water supply failure can be life-threatening.

The hot-water suit is normally a one-piece neoprene wetsuit, fairly loose fitting, to fit over a thin neoprene undersuit, which can protect the diver from scalding if the temperature control system fails, with a zipper on the front of the torso and on the lower part of each leg. Gloves and boots are worn which receive hot water from the ends of the arm and leg hoses. If a full-face mask is worn, the hood may be supplied by a tube at the neck of the suit. Helmets do not require heating. The heating water flows out at the neck and cuffs of the suit through the overlap with gloves, boots, or hood.

=== Emergency heating of divers ===
There is a need for emergency heating of divers trapped in a closed diving bell. The breathing gas may be helium based, at a high pressure, and the ambient water temperature may be quite low, down to 2 °C, with a typical temperature in the North Sea of about 5 °C. The bell itself is usually made of steel, a good thermal conductor, and the quality of bell insulation is variable, so the internal atmosphere tends to match the water temperature fairly soon after the heating fails. Divers trapped in bells for long periods have been subjected to various degrees of hypothermia when the primary heating systems failed. There have been deaths attributed to this cause.

Heat is lost much faster in a heliox atmosphere at high pressure, and in a dry environment conduction and convection from the body surface and from the lungs are much greater than in normal atmospheric air. Heat loss from the lungs can cause rapid core temperature loss even while the skin is not uncomfortably cold.

Passive systems were the first to be developed to a stage where they were considered functionally sufficient, and are relatively simple, economical and immediately available. Personal insulation for the diver, in the form of an insulated bag, combined with a breathing gas heat exchanger to conserve the heat of exhaled gas, and heat liberated by a personal carbon dioxide scrubber kept within the insulation layer round the diver is usually sufficient to keep the divers in thermal balance while waiting for rescue. The scrubber has an orinasal mask, and the bag is secured to the inside of the bell by a harness, to prevent the diver from collapsing if rendered unconscious, and potentially blocking access to the bell by rescuers.

There is also risk associated with reheating of hypothermic divers with high decompression stress. The peripheral tissues may have a high inert gas load due to vasoconstriction during decompression, and external heating that causes peripheral vasodilation may also trigger and increase bubble formation and growth. this is less likely to be a problem with core reheating and passive reheating. This problem does not arise with saturation divers who are kept under pressure.

== Influence on risk ==
The thermal status of the diver mostly affects immediate risk, both directly by physiological effects, and indirectly by behavioural and competence effects. There is some equipment which is known to increase risk.

=== Direct physiological and medical risk ===
The temperature of the diver's body or parts thereof affects the short term risk of:

- Decompression sickness, by affecting the rates of ingassing and outgassing of tissues by affecting solubility in the tissues and by affecting perfusion of the tissues.
- Hypothermia; particularly due to core heat loss through cold, dense breathing gas, and due to depressing vasoconstriction by superficial warming which may cause core temperature afterdrop.
- Immersion pulmonary oedema; vasoconstriction increases central blood volume.
- Non-freezing cold injury; usually of the hands, due to low perfusion when the body is cold and vasoconstriction increases localised heat loss, and limited glove insulation is used to allow sufficient dexterity to operate essential equipment.
- Frostbite; above the surface in sub-freezing temperatures, mostly to exposed areas.
- Heat exhaustion and heatstroke; in hot water and in hot surface conditions before the dive.
- Cardiac arrhythmia; diving in cold water is thought to increase risk for malign arrhythmia.

==== Effects of diver temperature distribution on decompression risk ====
The thermal status of the diver has a significant influence on decompression stress and risk, and from a safety point of view this is more important than thermal comfort. Ingassing while warm is faster than when cold, as is outgassing, due to differences in perfusion in response to temperature perception, which is mostly sensed in superficial tissues. Maintaining warmth for comfort during the ingassing phase of a dive can cause relatively high tissue gas loading, and getting cold during decompression can slow the elimination of gas due to reduced perfusion of the chilled tissues, and possibly also due to the higher solubility of the gas in chilled tissues.

The natural variation of diver temperature and heat distribution over time during a dive is opposite to the theoretically preferred variation, as a comfortably warm diver descending into cold water while well insulated, will spend the first part of the dive warmer than optimal, possibly performing sufficient work to maintain core and peripheral temperature, induce high perfusion to the muscles involved, and ingas fast, while during the ascent and decompression, a significant amount of heat may have already been lost, the peripheral tissues may be poorly perfused, and the diver will not generally be exercising much. These factors will slow outgassing in comparison with the ingassing rate of the dive. The chilled tissues may also be slower to outgas due to increased gas solubility at lower temperatures.

When the diver feels cold during an ascent, outgassing is probably compromised by vasoconstriction, and to reduce decompression risk they should extend decompression time in spite of prolonging the discomfort, rather than try to get out as soon as possible. External active heating while there is a fairly deep chilling of the surface layers could induce skin bends due to solubility changes in the surface tissues if the heating is too fast for perfusion to wash out excess inert gas. Light exercise during decompression can warm the diver slightly, and increase perfusion, which can help with outgassing, but heavy exercise may trigger bubble formation in the joints.

==== Thermal management to limit decompression stress ====
Decompression stress can be limited by following a specific thermal management strategy: In the period leading up to a dive, the diver should avoid unnecessary exercise and warming up that would increase peripheral perfusion in the ingassing sector of the dive. Sufficient passive insulation is needed to prevent excessive heat loss, but active heating of the surface tissues should be avoided or minimised while in the ingassing stages of the dive, to allow cold response vasoconstriction, which will limit both core heat loss and peripheral tissue ingassing. During ingassing, exercise should also be limited to what is necessary. During the ascent and decompression, slow and gentle active rewarming and mild exercise at a level that does not induce bubble formation and growth. can improve inert gas washout. After the dive, active superficial rewarming and strenuous exercise should be avoided until tissue gas loading has reduced sufficiently that decreased solubility in rewarmed tissues will not be a problem.

=== Risk due to loss of competence ===
Reduced core temperature is known to reduce situation awareness and analytical skills, both necessary for recognising the development of an unsafe situation and for timely correction or mitigation.

Cold exposure generally causes impairment of cognitive processes in healthy subjects at core temperatures above technical hypothermia. An exposure to cold may impair attention, speed of processing, memory and executive function, although the effects can depend to some extent on individual physiology and details of the specific exposure. Acclimatisation and repeated exposure can affect results. Delirium may occur in mild hypothermia with a core temperature of 32–35 °C (90–95 °F) The sensation of discomfort from cold may encourage poor judgement in a decision to not extend decompression time when the decompression risk has been increased by vasoconstriction.

Physical strength and dexterity are known to be reduced when the muscles are chilled. Even when core temperature and acceptable general body comfort is maintained in cold water, chilling of the extremities may result in loss of strength and dexterity in the affected parts. This cane compromise the ability of the diver to operate essential equipment in an emergency.

=== Risk associated with specific thermal management equipment ===
There is a greater risk of decompression sickness associated with the use of hot water suits in comparison with dry suits using only passive insulation. This is explained by the hypothesis that more inert gas is dissolved in the tissues during the bottom sector of the dive while the diver is working relatively hard as a consequence of higher perfusion due to exertion, and less vasoconstriction, due to the sensation of skin warmth from the external heating. Symptoms were predominantly skin bends. Similar effects can be expected with other active external heating systems (electric, chemical, latent heat), but core heating by heated breathing gas is not known to have this effect, and the effects on decompression risk of hot food and drinks after diving are thought to be negligible.

== Long term effects of cold water exposure ==
There are a few long term effects of cold water exposure; Persistent exposure of the external auditory canal to cold water can induce the growth of exostoses., and permanent effects of non-freezing cold injury can arise from exposure of hands and feet to cold water. The damage depends on temperature and length of exposure.
