= Role of geography in World War I =

Geography greatly affected the events and outcomes of World War I. As World War I was one of the first true global conflicts, it was shaped by the influence of multiple nations and each country's unique problems. Other factors helped shape the war and changed the course of fighting. With the rise of imperialism and a desire for resources, the war involved almost all European nations, and was therefore fought on several fronts. Geographic barriers created diversions and weather patterns helped in leading the Allies to victory. Also, the new spread of technology along with trench warfare and disease eventually led to the defeat of Germany and Austria-Hungary.

== Background ==
Imperialism before World War I had been on the rise since the mid-nineteenth century because industrialization had caused a growing need for natural resources. Regions like Africa and India had been settled by European countries in order to make profit and extend power. Tensions began to rise as nations formed alliances with one another to improve their strength. Due to geographical closeness, Germany, Austria-Hungary, and Italy came together as the Triple Alliance and later became the Central powers due to their central positioning in Europe. France and Britain became allies along with Russia in order to defend their borders and support each other in case of war. Conflicts in the Balkans grew steadily, and after the assassination of Archduke Franz Ferdinand, alliances drew almost all European nations and colonies into what would become known as World War I.

== The Fronts ==
Due to the geographical positioning of the Triple Entente, the Central Powers were faced on all sides by their enemies. Once Italy had joined in on the side of the Allies, the war became a three front war. The big Western front was in France, and Italian Front in the mountains of Italy, and the Eastern Front was on the border of Russia. Because Germany and Austria-Hungary had to split their armies, they were severely weakened. While the Schlieffen Plan intended for Germany to send ninety percent of their army to France and quickly overtake it then move to Russia, they were held up by fierce fighting at the First Battle of the Marne.

== Battles ==
Throughout major battles in the war, geography influenced the method of fighting and often the victor. At Ypres, many men died by drowning in thick, liquid mud and fighting conditions were awful The Gallipoli Campaign involved the death of many Australian Allied soldiers because of the positioning of the peninsula. The Ottoman soldiers were able to position themselves at the top of a hill while all of the Allied soldiers remained at the bottom. In order to defeat the Central Powers, they had to get to the top of the hill without getting shot. Very few men ever made it up the hill, and if they did, they were shot shortly after. The Gallipoli Campaign was a devastating loss for the Allies.

== Geographic Barriers ==
Fighting on the Italian Front involved the Swiss Alps and other mountains. Rivers, such as the Isonzo were fought over, to gain access to supplies and resources. The domination of seas was important because naval fighting was also a true sign of power. The vastness of Russia made it difficult for the Germans to reach, and once they dropped out of the war their front was simply used to catch the Central Powers on both sides.

== Weather ==
Brutal winters diminished supplies and left both sides cold, starving, and wet. Lack of shoes and good clothes caused vulnerability and the spread of disease. Rain, snow, heat, and cold all played their role in World War One because of the giant amount of areas the war was fought in.

== Transfer of Knowledge ==
The Atlantic Ocean was home to submarines, naval ships, and also the transfer of goods. Domination on the seas was necessary for getting supplies, people, and weapons from place to place. With new technology, ideas were able to spread quickly and new warfare was created by both sides such as poison gas. Communication also played a role in getting the United States to join the war. The interception of the Zimmermann Telegram as well as the sinking of the RMS Lusitania both helped persuade the US in joining the war.

== The Trenches ==
Trench Warfare was common during WWI, although it was not exactly the healthiest or morale-boosting experience for soldiers living in the trenches. They were constantly wet and water would often build up to several inches. Urine, body odor, poison gas, bad food, rats, little clothing, and misery all defined the trench lifestyle. Diseases such as trench foot emerged and close quarters caused the infection to be passed from one person to another and from rats and bugs to humans as well. Loud bombs often were the cause of deafness and long periods in the trench often led to mental illness such as shell shock (Now known as PTSD). While the Germans had running water, electricity, and had the moral support of the troops

== Outcome and Effects ==
The geography of World War One helped it to play out the way it did. The brutal conditions, geographic landmarks, and outbreaks of disease as well as location helped in bringing the defeat of the Central Powers. After the war at the Treaty of Versailles, Austria-Hungary was broken up into two separate countries, and much of the German landscape was given away to France, Poland, and others. This angered Germany and set up tensions for another war of the worlds.
