= Non-freezing cold injury =

Tissue injury due to sustained low temperature without freezing

- Other names: NFCI
- Usual onset: Following exposure
- Duration: Indefinite
- Causes: Prolonged exposure to low temperatures above freezing
- Risk factors: Occupational, social
- Diagnostic method: Based on symptoms and history of exposure
- Differential diagnosis: Decompression sickness, hand-arm vibration syndrome
- Prevention: Personal protective clothing
- Treatment: Rewarming
- Medication: Analgesic
- Prognosis: Variable

A non-freezing cold injury (NFCI) is tissue damage caused by prolonged exposure to cold temperatures above freezing, typically in wet conditions. It primarily affects the extremities and is characterized by microvascular and nerve injury, often resulting in pain, sensory changes, and long-term cold sensitivity. There are several forms of NFCI, and the common names may refer to the circumstances in which they commonly occur or were first described, such as trench foot, which was named after its association with trench warfare. NFCI is caused by microvascular endothelial damage, stasis and vascular occlusion and is characterised by peripheral neuropathy. NFCI generally affects the hands or feet during exposure to temperatures just above freezing, often wet, and is typically found in soldiers.

Development may be gradual, and it may be difficult to recognize and treat. Initially the affected area is cold and numb, but this changes to hyperemia (changes to blood flow) within a day or two, along with an intense, painful, burning sensation, blisters, redness, and in some cases ulceration. It may have lifelong effects, including numbness, paraesthesia, and chronic pain, the etiology of which is not yet adequately demonstrated. Hypersensitivity to cold may also occur.

Strategies to reduce the impact of the condition focus on recognizing those at risk, limiting exposure, and using suitable personal protective equipment.

Symptoms may be similar to those of decompression sickness and hand-arm vibration syndrome, and NFCI may occur in conditions where these are possible or likely – diving in cold water, and logging and construction work in cold environments.

== Classification ==
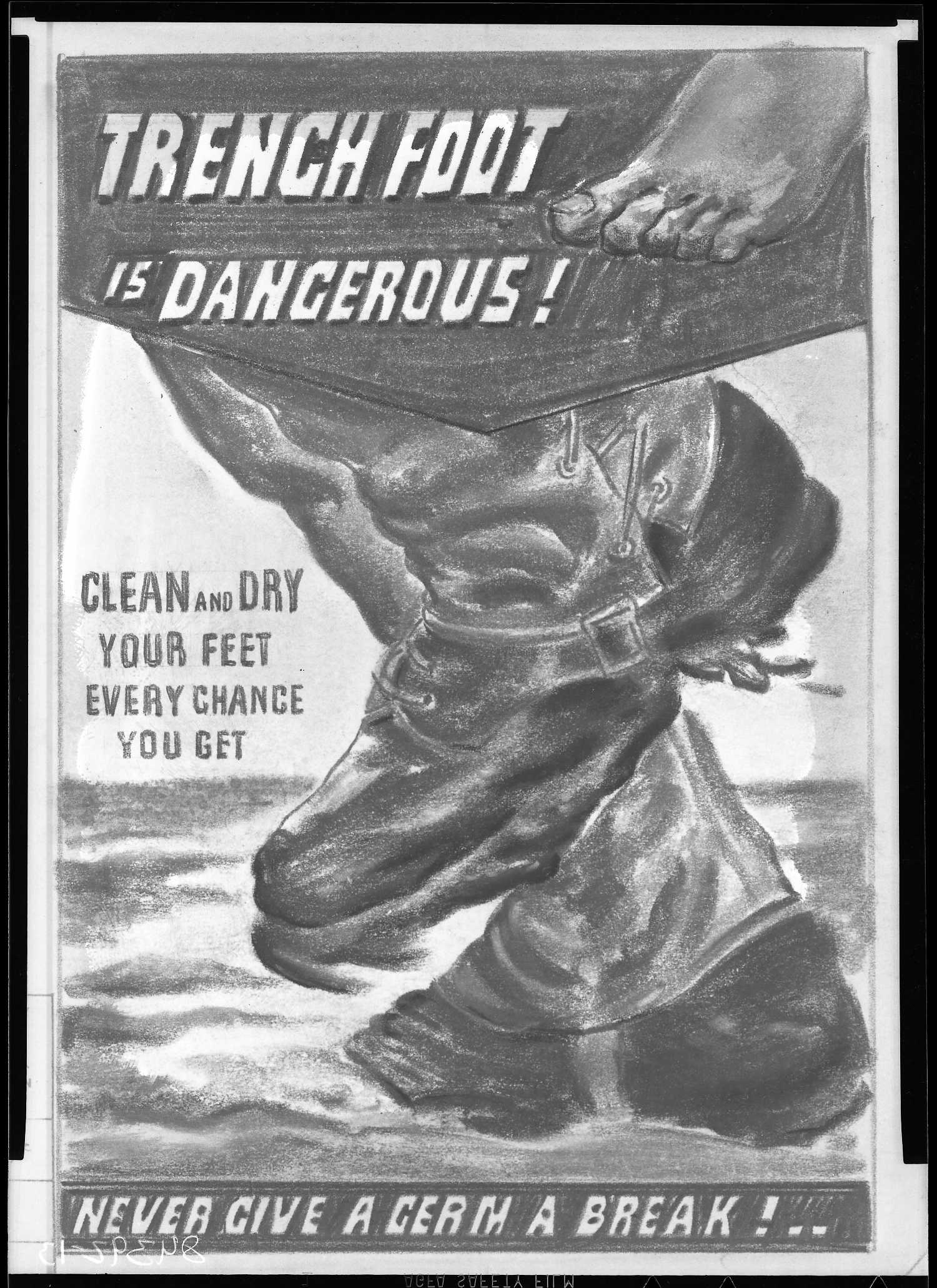
Trench foot poster/Health and sanitation

Non-freezing cold injury is a form of cold injury in which there is no freeze–thaw damage. Cold injury may be divided into local and systemic cold injury. Systemic cold injury is generally known as hypothermia. Local cold injury can be divided into freezing and non-freezing cold injury. Freezing cold injury (FCI) is generally known as frostbite.

Types of NFCI:

- Trench foot
- Immersion foot
- NFCI due to cold water diving exposure.

== Presentation ==
Four distinct stages occur:

1. During cold exposure, vasoconstriction reduces perfusion, and the tissue becomes cold and numb. This may affect senses of touch and proprioception, resulting in loss of dexterity and strength, clumsiness, and disturbance of gait. Skin color may be initially flushed, followed by pallor.
2. After cold exposure, and during warming, a short phase of mottled cyanosis may occur, while remaining cold and numb, with swelling and reduced peripheral pulses.
3. The third stage, of hyperaemia, may last for several weeks. with swelling and hot, red, dry skin, poor microcirculation, but full peripheral pulses. Paraesthesias and pain are likely, and areas of skin may show signs of necrosis.
4. The final stages may last for weeks to years, even indefinitely. Obvious physical signs may dissipate, with reduced inflammatory responses and reduced limb temperature. Complications may occur.

=== Complications ===
Short-term complications can include infection of the affected area and gangrene. Walking in the first few days of recovery may be affected by poor coordination of the affected limb and have a springless gait. Longer-term complications may include chronic pain and temperature sensitivity.

== Causes ==
NFCI is caused by microvascular endothelial damage, stasis and vascular occlusion, and generally affects the hands or feet during exposure to temperatures just above freezing, often wet.

Risk factors include exposure of the extremities to cold 0 to 15 °C (32 to 59 °F) and wet for prolonged periods, usually two to three days or longer, but the duration is relative to the temperature, and cases have been reported after immersion in cold sea water 0 to 8 °C (32 to 46 °F) after considerably shorter exposures, and higher temperatures (up to 21 °C (70 °F) for longer periods (order of 8 days). NFCI correlates with exposure to cold environment with fatigue, malnutrition, and immobility or restricted movement, poor environmental protection, inadequate fluid or caloric intake, fatigue, and stress, often while wearing constricting shoes or boots continuously for many days. Pre-existing conditions that may increase susceptibility include circulatory problems, including peripheral vascular disease or Raynaud phenomenon, and diabetes. Smoking, older age, and ethnicity may have effects, but data are inconclusive. Mental illness and alcohol use may also be risk factors.

== Mechanism ==
The skin has an important thermoregulatory function, controlled by variation of blood flow, which can be reduced to about 10% of baseline without ischaemia, as the metabolic requirements of skin are low. Maximum skin vasoconstriction occurs in the extremities when cooled to around 15 °C (59 °F), with further cooling causing an increased perfusion due to the "hunting response", or cold-induced vasodilation, which occurs in 5 to 10 minute cycles, which may adapt in strength and cycling rate with repeated exposures. A strong response is thought to improve resistance to NFCI, but evidence is not conclusive.

The mechanism of NFCI is poorly understood. Reduced control of circulation and damage to the microcirculation are characteristic. Although some authorities consider the cause to be only prolonged vasoconstriction, others think it likely to be more complex. There is evidence suggesting that extent and severity of tissue damage is due to a combination of temperature and duration, and that repeated exposures may cause more damage than a single longer exposure. Damage to nerves and to the microvascular blood supply of nerves may be reversible or irreversible. The duration of a single exposure at a given temperature that is likely to cause NFCI is not known, and the quantitative effects of multiple exposures are similarly unclear. The presence of a wet environment appears to be important, and immobility and malnutrition appear to be contributory. Experimental evidence suggests a complex mode of injury with microvascular disruption, cyclic ischaemia, reperfusion injury and direct damage to nerves due to cold. Large, myelinated nerve fibres appear to be more susceptible.

Tissue loss may occur in severe cases, but is thought to be caused by pressure injury, with or without compartment syndrome, and mechanical injury, and not by the cold.

== Diagnosis ==
It can be difficult to distinguish FCI from NFCI and to assess the degree of injury during initial examination, as both types of local cold injury can occur on the same limb, and deep tissue damage may take weeks to manifest. Frostbite can be ruled out if there was no exposure to temperatures several degrees below freezing.

NFCI can occur in situations where decompression sickness is possible in underwater diving in cold water, and in situations where hand-arm vibration syndrome is possible in outdoor work with machinery such as chainsaws and jackhammers in cold climates, which can complicate differential diagnosis.

In underwater diving diagnosis is complicated by a significant overlap of symptoms between decompression sickness and NFCI. The symptoms of decompression sickness with a peripheral neuropathy (such as pain and numbness) may be similar to NFCI. Both conditions are caused by environmental exposure, and there are no high sensitivity and specificity diagnostic tests for either condition. Diagnosis may rely on dive history, particularly water temperature, though the quality of insulation and fit of the suit will have an influence on perfusion and heat loss. Definitive treatment for DCS is hyperbaric oxygen therapy, which is expensive, but unlikely to aggravate NFCI, and first aid provision of 100% oxygen for suspected DCS is relatively inexpensive, often available and will do no harm, whereas over-warming of a case of DCS may cause bubble growth and aggravate the condition.

== Prevention ==
Strategies to reduce the impact of the condition focus on recognition of those at risk, limiting exposure, and use of suitable personal protective equipment.

== Treatment ==
First aid treatment is similar to first aid for frostbite.

Treatment should prioritise systemic cold injury, as it may be immediately life-threatening, then freezing cold injury, followed by non-freezing cold injury where combinations occur.

In cases of isolated NFCI the extremities should be allowed to rewarm gradually with rest and elevation of the affected limbs. Rapid rewarming will increase pain and edema. Air drying is preferred.

== Prognosis ==
Persistent symptoms including increased sensitivity to cold can continue long after the original injury, and may have long term psychological and financial effects, and are the basis of a significant number of military legal claims.

== Epidemiology ==
NFCI is known as a cause of significant morbidity in military personnel and civilians who work in cold conditions, mountaineers, fishermen, homeless people, and occasionally, underwater divers.

Cold injuries have long been recognised as a military problem. Early descriptions were recorded by Napoleon's chief surgeon, Dominique Jean Larrey. Trench foot was a major problem in World War I, and millions of man–days were lost in World War II to cold injury. Both Argentinian and British troops reported cold injuries in the Falklands campaign. In civilians, those affected include homeless people and the urban poor, wilderness enthusiasts and mountaineers, and people taking part in winter sports. It is often also associated with psychiatric illness and drug and alcohol abuse, and occasionally with underwater diving.

== See also ==
Other cold-related conditions:

- Frostbite – Effect of low temperature on skin and other tissues
- Pernio, or chilblains – Inflammation due to damage of skin capillaries when blood perfuses into nearby tissue
- Cold urticaria – Allergic reaction to low temperatures
- Raynaud syndrome – Medical condition
