= Lysinibacillus xylanilyticus =

Scientific classification
- Domain: Bacteria
- Kingdom: Bacillati
- Phylum: Bacillota
- Class: Bacilli
- Order: Bacillales
- Family: Caryophanaceae
- Genus: Lysinibacillus
- Species: L. xylanilyticus

Binomial name
- Lysinibacillus xylanilyticus Lee et al. 2010

Type strain
- XDB9

Bacterium of genus of Lysinibacillus

Lysinibacillus xylanilyticus is a Gram-positive, aerobic, xylan-degrading, endospore-forming and motile bacterium from the genus of Lysinibacillus which has been isolated from forest humus from the Gyeryong Mountain.
