= Lysinibacillus louembei =

Scientific classification
- Domain: Bacteria
- Kingdom: Bacillati
- Phylum: Bacillota
- Class: Bacilli
- Order: Bacillales
- Family: Caryophanaceae
- Genus: Lysinibacillus
- Species: L. louembei

Binomial name
- Lysinibacillus louembei Ouoba et al. 2015

Type strain
- NM73

Bacterium of genus of Lysinibacillus

Lysinibacillus louembei is a Gram-positive, aerobic, rod-shaped and motile bacterium from the genus of Lysinibacillus.
