= Lysinibacillus parviboronicapiens =

Scientific classification
- Domain: Bacteria
- Kingdom: Bacillati
- Phylum: Bacillota
- Class: Bacilli
- Order: Bacillales
- Family: Caryophanaceae
- Genus: Lysinibacillus
- Species: L. parviboronicapiens

Binomial name
- Lysinibacillus parviboronicapiens Miwa et al. 2009

Type strain
- BAM-582

Synonyms
- Lysinibacillus soli

Bacterium of genus of Lysinibacillus

Lysinibacillus parviboronicapiens is a Gram-positive, rod-shaped, spore-forming and motile bacterium from the genus of Lysinibacillus which has been isolated from soil.
