= Lysinibacillus cavernae =

Scientific classification
- Domain: Bacteria
- Kingdom: Bacillati
- Phylum: Bacillota
- Class: Bacilli
- Order: Bacillales
- Family: Caryophanaceae
- Genus: Lysinibacillus
- Species: L. cavernae

Binomial name
- Lysinibacillus cavernae Kan et al. 2021

Type strain
- SYSU K30005

Bacterium of genus of Lysinibacillus

Lysinibacillus cavernae is a Gram-positive, rod-shaped and motile bacterium from the genus of Lysinibacillus which has been isolated from soil from a karst cave in Libo County.
