= Lysinibacillus boronitolerans =

Scientific classification
- Domain: Bacteria
- Kingdom: Bacillati
- Phylum: Bacillota
- Class: Bacilli
- Order: Caryophanales
- Family: Caryophanaceae
- Genus: Lysinibacillus
- Species: L. boronitolerans

Binomial name
- Lysinibacillus boronitolerans Ahmed et al. 2007

Species of bacterium

Lysinibacillus boronitolerans is a spore-forming, Gram-positive, motile, rod-shaped and boron-tolerant bacterium with type strain 10a^{T} (=DSM 17140^{T} =IAM 15262^{T} = ATCC BAA-1146^{T}).
