= Ureibacillus terrenus =

Scientific classification
- Domain: Bacteria
- Kingdom: Bacillati
- Phylum: Bacillota
- Class: Bacilli
- Order: Caryophanales
- Family: Caryophanaceae
- Genus: Ureibacillus
- Species: U. terrenus

Binomial name
- Ureibacillus terrenus Fortina et al. 2001

Species of bacterium

Ureibacillus terrenus is a species of bacteria with type species TH9A^{T} (= DSM 12654^{T} = LMG 19470^{T}).
