= Lysinibacillus contaminans =

Scientific classification
- Domain: Bacteria
- Kingdom: Bacillati
- Phylum: Bacillota
- Class: Bacilli
- Order: Bacillales
- Family: Caryophanaceae
- Genus: Lysinibacillus
- Species: L. contaminans

Binomial name
- Lysinibacillus contaminans Kämpfer et al. 2013

Type strain
- FSt3A

Bacterium of genus of Lysinibacillus

Lysinibacillus contaminans is a Gram-positive, aerobic and endospore-forming bacterium from the genus of Lysinibacillus which has been isolated from surface water.
