= Lysinibacillus agricola =

Scientific classification
- Domain: Bacteria
- Kingdom: Bacillati
- Phylum: Bacillota
- Class: Bacilli
- Order: Bacillales
- Family: Caryophanaceae
- Genus: Lysinibacillus
- Species: L. agricola

Binomial name
- Lysinibacillus agricola Lu and Liu 2021

Type strain
- FJAT-51161

Bacterium of genus of Lysinibacillus

Lysinibacillus agricola is a Gram-positive and rod-shaped bacterium from the genus of Lysinibacillus which has been isoladed from soil from Fujian.
