= Lysinibacillus varians =

Scientific classification
- Domain: Bacteria
- Kingdom: Bacillati
- Phylum: Bacillota
- Class: Bacilli
- Order: Bacillales
- Family: Caryophanaceae
- Genus: Lysinibacillus
- Species: L. varians

Binomial name
- Lysinibacillus varians Zhu et al. 2014

Type strain
- GY32

Bacterium of genus of Lysinibacillus

Lysinibacillus varians is a Gram-positive, rod-shaped, spore-forming and motile bacterium from the genus of Lysinibacillus.
