= Ureibacillus suwonensis =

Scientific classification
- Domain: Bacteria
- Kingdom: Bacillati
- Phylum: Bacillota
- Class: Bacilli
- Order: Caryophanales
- Family: Caryophanaceae
- Genus: Ureibacillus
- Species: U. suwonensis

Binomial name
- Ureibacillus suwonensis Kim et al. 2006

Type strain
- DSM 16752, KACC 11287, strain 6T19

Genus of bacteria

Ureibacillus suwonensis is a bacterium from the genus of Ureibacillus which has been isolated from cotton waste compost from Suwon in Korea.
