= Lysinibacillus capsici =

Scientific classification
- Domain: Bacteria
- Kingdom: Bacillati
- Phylum: Bacillota
- Class: Bacilli
- Order: Bacillales
- Family: Caryophanaceae
- Genus: Lysinibacillus
- Species: L. capsici

Binomial name
- Lysinibacillus capsici Burkett-Cadena et al. 2019

Type strain
- PB300

Bacterium of genus of Lysinibacillus

Lysinibacillus capsici is a Gram-positive, strictly aerobic, rod-shaped, endospore-forming and motile bacterium from the genus of Lysinibacillus which has been isolated from rhizospheric soil of a pepper plant.
