= Lysinibacillus tabacifolii =

Scientific classification
- Domain: Bacteria
- Kingdom: Bacillati
- Phylum: Bacillota
- Class: Bacilli
- Order: Bacillales
- Family: Caryophanaceae
- Genus: Lysinibacillus
- Species: L. tabacifolii

Binomial name
- Lysinibacillus tabacifolii Duan et al. 2014

Type strain
- K3514

Synonyms
- Lysinibacillus tabacum

Bacterium of genus of Lysinibacillus

Lysinibacillus tabacifolii is a Gram-positive, strictly aerobic and endospore-forming bacterium from the genus of Lysinibacillus which has been isolated from leaves of the plant Nicotiana tabacum.
