= Lysinibacillus cresolivorans =

Scientific classification
- Domain: Bacteria
- Kingdom: Bacillati
- Phylum: Bacillota
- Class: Bacilli
- Order: Bacillales
- Family: Caryophanaceae
- Genus: Lysinibacillus
- Species: L. cresolivorans

Binomial name
- Lysinibacillus cresolivorans Ren et al. 2015

Type strain
- SC03

Bacterium of genus of Lysinibacillus

Lysinibacillus cresolivorans is a Gram-positive, facultatively anaerobic, rod-shaped and endospore-forming bacterium from the genus of Lysinibacillus.
