= Lysinibacillus meyeri =

Scientific classification
- Domain: Bacteria
- Kingdom: Bacillati
- Phylum: Bacillota
- Class: Bacilli
- Order: Bacillales
- Family: Caryophanaceae
- Genus: Lysinibacillus
- Species: L. meyeri

Binomial name
- Lysinibacillus meyeri Seiler et al. 2013

Type strain
- WS 4626

Bacterium of genus of Lysinibacillus

Lysinibacillus meyeri is a Gram-positive bacterium from the genus of Lysinibacillus which has been isolated from a medical practice.
