= Ureibacillus composti =

Scientific classification
- Domain: Bacteria
- Kingdom: Bacillati
- Phylum: Bacillota
- Class: Bacilli
- Order: Caryophanales
- Family: Caryophanaceae
- Genus: Ureibacillus
- Species: U. composti

Binomial name
- Ureibacillus composti Weon et al. 2007

Type strain
- DSM 17951, KACC 11361, strain HC145

Synonyms
- Ureibacillus rudaensis

Genus of bacteria

Ureibacillus composti is a Gram-positive, rod-shaped and thermophilic bacterium from the genus of Ureibacillus which has been isolated from livestock-manure compost from Ichon in South Korea.
