= Ureibacillus defluvii =

Scientific classification
- Domain: Bacteria
- Kingdom: Bacillati
- Phylum: Bacillota
- Class: Bacilli
- Order: Caryophanales
- Family: Caryophanaceae
- Genus: Ureibacillus
- Species: U. defluvii

Binomial name
- Ureibacillus defluvii Zhou et al. 2014

Type strain
- CGMCC 1.12358, KCTC 33127, strain DX-1

Genus of bacteria

Ureibacillus defluvii is a Gram-positive, thermophilic, rod-shaped and non-motile bacterium from the genus of Ureibacillus.
