= Lysinibacillus mangiferihumi =

Scientific classification
- Domain: Bacteria
- Kingdom: Bacillati
- Phylum: Bacillota
- Class: Bacilli
- Order: Bacillales
- Family: Caryophanaceae
- Genus: Lysinibacillus
- Species: L. mangiferihumi

Binomial name
- Lysinibacillus mangiferihumi Yang et al. 2012

Type strain
- M-GX18

Synonyms
- Lysinibacillus mangiferahumi

Bacterium of genus of Lysinibacillus

Lysinibacillus mangiferihumi is a Gram-positive bacterium from the genus of Lysinibacillus.
