= Lysinibacillus fusiformis =

Scientific classification
- Domain: Bacteria
- Kingdom: Bacillati
- Phylum: Bacillota
- Class: Bacilli
- Order: Bacillales
- Family: Caryophanaceae
- Genus: Lysinibacillus
- Species: L. fusiformis

Binomial name
- Lysinibacillus fusiformis (Ahmed et al., 2007)

Type strain
- ZC1; ZB2; HK1; B-1; DSM 2898; JCM 12229; LMG 9816; ATCC 7055; CCUG 28888; NBRC 15717

Synonyms
- Bacillus fusiformis Aerobacillus fusiformis (Meyer and Gottheil, 1901); Bacillus sphaericus subsp. fusiformis (Smith et al., 1946)

Species of bacterium

Lysinibacillus fusiformis (commonly abbreviated L. fusiformis) is a gram-positive, rod-shaped bacterium of the genus Lysinibacillus. Scientists have yet to completely characterize this microbe's pathogenic nature. Though little is known about this organism, several genome sequencing projects for various strains of L. fusiformis are currently underway.

== History ==
Lysinibacillus fusiformis was initially isolated from the surface of Beta vulgaris by German biologist Dr. O. Gottheil in 1901. Dr. Gottheil used a variety of isolation techniques, which included cultivating the organism on carrot and beet slices. L. fusiformis was originally known as Bacillus fusiformis prior to 2007; at which point it was reclassified to the genus Lysinibacillus, along with its close relative Bacillus sphaericus. The taxonomic classification of the organism was reassigned as a result of L. fusiformis' distinctive characteristics, such as physiology, phylogeny, and peptidoglycan composition.

=== Etymology ===
The meaning of "lysini," as it pertains to members of the genus Lysinibacillus, signifies the presence of lysine, alanine, glutamic acid, and aspartic acid in the peptidoglycan layer of the cell wall. “Bacillus”, meaning small-rod, refers to the rod-shaped physiology of the bacterial form. “Fusum” translates to spindle and “forma” denotes a particular figure, appearance, or configuration. Thus, “fusiformis” is derived from the bacteria's spindle-like structure.

== Morphology ==
Lysinibacillus fusiformis is gram-positive, rod-shaped, non-motile bacterium. Active cells have an approximate length of 2.5-3.0 micrometers and an approximate width of 0.5-0.9 micrometers. Under strenuous conditions, this microbe can generate inactive spherical endospores that are resistant to high temperatures, damaging chemicals, and ultraviolet light. The developing endospores localize either centrally or terminally within the enlarged sporangia and can remain functional for long periods of time.

== Ecology ==
Lysinibacillus fusiformis is a naturally occurring bacterium and various strains have been isolated from multiple environments including farming soil and factory wastewater. This organism is considered to be altogether mesophilic; growing best at a temperature range of 17-37 degrees Celsius. L. fusiformis is also considered to be mildly alkaliphilic and moderately halophilic; growing best at a pH range of 6–9.5 and an NaCl concentration of 2-7%.

=== Pathogenicity ===
In the 20th century, Lysinibacillus fusiformis was believed to cause a form of pathogenicity in humans relating to tropical ulcer formations and dermal and/or respiratory infections. Some researchers believed that L. fusiformis infections could only occur as a symbiotic relationship with certain spirochaete species. Multiple experiments to prove the existence of pathogenicity have turned up inconclusive In 2010, researchers identified a strain of L. fusiformis, B-1, from 16S rRNA gene analysis. This strain has been found exclusively in the toxin of the puffer fish, Takifugu obscurus. This toxin is a tetrodotoxin, which is a highly fatal neurotoxin that destroys the central nervous system of humans causing paralysis. L. fusiformis is shown to be sensitive to the common broad-spectrum antibiotic known as tetracycline.

== Metabolism ==
Lysinibacillus fusiformis tests positive for oxidase and is an obligate aerobe. This means that it can utilize oxygen to metabolize various sugars and other simple carbohydrates. However, it does not metabolize polysaccharides such as starch. This organism does not produce acid or gas from the metabolism of D-glucose or any other carbohydrates and does not reduce nitrate to nitrite. L. fusiformis can hydrolyze casein and gelatin. It can also utilize acetate, citrate, formate, lactate, and succinate as carbon sources. From a metabolic standpoint, L. fusiformis and Lysinibacillus sphaericus are nearly identical. As of now, the only known factor that distinguishes these two species is that L. fusiformis is positive for urease. This means that L. fusiformis can hydrolyze urea to produce ammonia and CO_{2}. In 2011, the strain L. fusiformis ZC1 was shown to retain the ability to reduce chromate to chromium.

== Genomics ==
As of 2014, there are a couple partial 16S rRNA gene sequences (GenBank No. AF169537 and EU430993) that have been analyzed for L. fusiformis and several whole genome sequences of various strains. There are multiple ongoing genome sequencing projects involving this organism. Currently, these genomic sequences exist as scaffolds and include the following strains: Lysinibacillus fusiformis H1K, Lysinibacillus fusiformis ZB2, and Lysinibacillus fusiformis ZC1. According to the National Center for Biotechnology Information, L. fusiformis ZC1 (BioProject: PRJNA226204) is the current genomic representative for L. fusiformis. The L. fusiformis ZC1 genome was sequenced using the whole genome shotgun sequencing method. Genomic analysis of strain ZC1 shows a genome with an approximate length of 4.65 megabases that contains 4,729 protein-coding genes and maintains a relatively moderate GC content (mol%) of 37.3%. The gene chrA was found in L. fusiformis and encodes a chromate Cr(VI) transporter that confirms chromate Cr(VI) resistance.

== Applications to science and medicine ==
The mechanism of L. fusiformis’ pathogenicity is not well understood by microbiologists.

=== Plastic Degradation ===
In 2016, a group of researchers led by Prof. A. B. Ade at the Department of Botany, Savitribai Phule University, Pune, MS, India reported 22% reduction in weight loss of the plastic (polythene) with Lysinibacillus fusiformis strain VASB14/WL after 2 months of regular shaking at room temperature.
