= Lysinibacillus =

Scientific classification
- Domain: Bacteria
- Kingdom: Bacillati
- Phylum: Bacillota
- Class: Bacilli
- Order: Bacillales
- Family: Caryophanaceae
- Genus: Lysinibacillus; Ahmed et al. 2007

Type species
- Lysinibacillus boronitolerans Ahmed et al. 2007

Species
- See text

Synonyms
- "Fusibacillus" Pribram 1929 non Bai et al. 2024; "Lineola" Pringsheim & Robinow 1947 ex Pringsheim 1950 non von Baer 1827

Genus of bacteria

Lysinibacillus is a genus of gram-positive bacteria from the family of Bacillaceae. Members of this genus, in contrast to the type species of the genus Bacillus, contains peptidoglycan with lysine, aspartic acid, alanine and glutamic acid.

== Phylogeny ==
The currently accepted taxonomy is based on the List of Prokaryotic names with Standing in Nomenclature (LPSN) and National Center for Biotechnology Information (NCBI)

16S rRNA based LTP_10_2024

- Lysinibacillus
  - - L. irui Akintayo et al. 2023
    - - - L. macroides Bennett & Canale-Parola 1965 ex Coorevits et al. 2012
        - L. pakistanensis Ahmed et al. 2014
      - - L. capsici Burkett-Cadena et al. 2019
        - - L. boronitolerans Ahmed et al. 2007
          - L. cresolivorans Ren et al. 2015
  - - L. xylanilyticus Lee et al. 2010
    - - - L. sphaericus (Meyer & Neide 1904) Ahmed et al. 2007
        - - L. cavernae Kan et al. 2021
          - L. fusiformis (Priest, Goodfellow & Todd 1989) Ahmed et al. 2007
      - - L. parviboronicapiens Miwa et al. 2009
        - - L. contaminans Kämpfer, Martin & Glaeser 2013
          - Solibacillus [incl. Caryophanon]

120 marker proteins based GTDB 09-RS220

- Lysinibacillus
  - - - "L. agricola" Lu & Liu 2021
      - L. xylanilyticus
    - - - L. mangiferihumi corrig. Yang et al. 2012
        - L. sphaericus [incl. L. tabacifolii; L. varians]
      - - L. contaminans
        - L. parviboronicapiens
  - - L. pakistanensis
    - - L. macroides
      - - L. fusiformis
        - - L. cavernae
          - - L. boronitolerans
            - L. capsici

Lysinibacillus species assigned to other genera:

- L. alkaliphilus Zhao et al. 2015
- L. alkalisoli Sun, Xu & Wu 2017
- L. antri Narsing Rao et al. 2020
- L. composti Hayat et al. 2014
- L. endophyticus Yu et al. 2017
- L. halotolerans Kong et al. 2014
- L. louembei Ouoba et al. 2015
- L. meyeri Seiler, Scherer & Wenning 2013
- L. odysseyi (La Duc, Satomi & Venkateswaran 2004) Jung et al. 2012
- L. telephonicus Rahi et al. 2017
- "L. timonensis" Ndiaye et al. 2019
- L. yapensis Yu et al. 2020

== See also ==
- List of bacterial orders
- List of bacteria genera
