= Lysinibacillus telephonicus =

Scientific classification
- Domain: Bacteria
- Kingdom: Bacillati
- Phylum: Bacillota
- Class: Bacilli
- Order: Bacillales
- Family: Caryophanaceae
- Genus: Lysinibacillus
- Species: L. telephonicus

Binomial name
- Lysinibacillus telephonicus Rahi et al. 2017

Type strain
- S5H2222

Bacterium of genus of Lysinibacillus

Lysinibacillus telephonicus is a Gram-positive, aerobic, rod-shaped, endospore-forming and motile bacterium from the genus of Lysinibacillus which has been isolated from the screen of a cellular phone.
