= Lysinibacillus halotolerans =

Scientific classification
- Domain: Bacteria
- Kingdom: Bacillati
- Phylum: Bacillota
- Class: Bacilli
- Order: Bacillales
- Family: Caryophanaceae
- Genus: Lysinibacillus
- Species: L. halotolerans

Binomial name
- Lysinibacillus halotolerans Kong et al. 2014

Type strain
- LAM612

Bacterium of genus of Lysinibacillus

Lysinibacillus halotolerans is a Gram-positive, aerobic, halotolerant, endospore-forming and rod-shaped bacterium from the genus of Lysinibacillus which has been isolated from saline-alkaline soil from Lingxian County.
