= Lysinibacillus composti =

Scientific classification
- Domain: Bacteria
- Kingdom: Bacillati
- Phylum: Bacillota
- Class: Bacilli
- Order: Bacillales
- Family: Caryophanaceae
- Genus: Lysinibacillus
- Species: L. composti

Binomial name
- Lysinibacillus composti Hayat et al. 2014

Type strain
- NCCP-36

Bacterium of genus of Lysinibacillus

Lysinibacillus composti is a Gram-positive, rod-shaped, endospore-forming and motile bacterium from the genus of Lysinibacillus which has been isolated from compost.
