= Lysinibacillus endophyticus =

Scientific classification
- Domain: Bacteria
- Kingdom: Bacillati
- Phylum: Bacillota
- Class: Bacilli
- Order: Bacillales
- Family: Caryophanaceae
- Genus: Lysinibacillus
- Species: L. endophyticus

Binomial name
- Lysinibacillus endophyticus Yu et al. 2017

Type strain
- C9

Bacterium of genus of Lysinibacillus

Lysinibacillus endophyticus is a Gram-positive, aerobic and rod-shaped bacterium from the genus of Lysinibacillus which has been isolated from the root of a maize plant. Lysinibacillus endophyticus produces indole-3-acetic acid.
