= Lysinibacillus antri =

Scientific classification
- Domain: Bacteria
- Kingdom: Bacillati
- Phylum: Bacillota
- Class: Bacilli
- Order: Bacillales
- Family: Caryophanaceae
- Genus: Lysinibacillus
- Species: L. antri

Binomial name
- Lysinibacillus antri Narsing Rao et al. 2020

Type strain
- SYSU K30002

Bacterium of genus of Lysinibacillus

Lysinibacillus antri is a Gram-positive, rod-shaped, endospore-forming and motile bacterium from the genus of Lysinibacillus which has been isolated from soil from a karst cave in Xingyi county.
