= Immersion foot syndromes =

Immersion foot
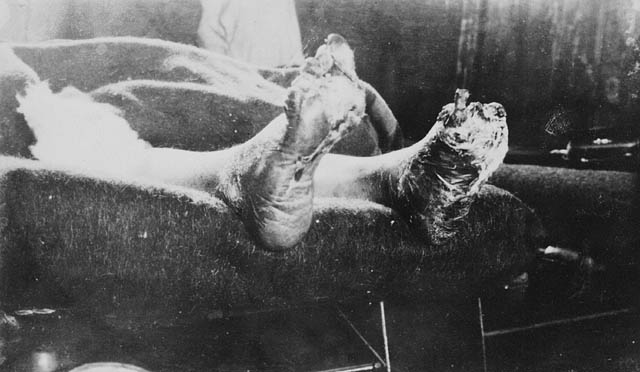
- Trench foot as seen on an unidentified soldier during World War I
- Specialty: Dermatology

Immersion foot syndromes are a class of foot injury caused by water absorption in the outer layer of skin. There are different subclass names for this condition based on the temperature of the water to which the foot is exposed. These include trench foot, tropical immersion foot, and warm water immersion foot. In one 3-day military study, it was found that submersion in water allowing for a higher skin temperature resulted in worse skin maceration and pain.

== Causes ==
=== Trench foot ===
Trench foot is a medical condition caused by prolonged exposure of the feet to damp, unsanitary, and cold conditions. The use of the word trench in the name of this condition is a reference to trench warfare, mainly associated with World War I. Affected feet may become numb, affected by erythrosis (turning red) or cyanosis (turning blue) as a result of poor vascular supply, and feet may begin to have a decaying odour due to the possibility of the early stages of necrosis setting in. As the condition worsens, feet may also begin to swell. Advanced trench foot often involves blisters and open sores, which lead to fungal infections; this is sometimes called tropical ulcer (jungle rot).

If left untreated, trench foot usually results in gangrene, which can cause the need for amputation. If trench foot is treated properly, complete recovery is normal, though it is marked by severe short-term pain when feeling returns. As with other cold-related injuries, trench foot leaves those affected more susceptible to it in the future.

=== Tropical immersion foot ===
Tropical immersion foot (also known as "Paddy foot", and "Paddy-field foot") is a skin condition of the feet seen after continuous immersion of the feet in water or mud of temperature above 22 °C (72 °F) for two to ten days.

=== Warm water immersion foot ===
Warm water immersion foot is a skin condition of the feet that results after exposure to warm, wet conditions for 48 hours or more and is characterized by maceration ("pruning"), blanching, and wrinkling of the soles, padding of toes (especially the big toe) and padding of the sides of the feet.

Foot maceration occur whenever exposed for prolonged periods to moist conditions. Large watery blisters appear which are painful when they open and begin to peel away from the foot itself. The heels, sides and bony prominences are left with large areas of extremely sensitive, red tissue, exposed and prone to infection. As the condition worsens, more blisters develop due to prolonged dampness which eventually covers the entire heel and/or other large, padded sections of the foot, especially the undersides as well as toes. Each layer in turn peels away resulting in deep, extremely tender, red ulcers.

Healing occurs only when the feet are cleansed, dried and exposed to air for weeks. Scarring is permanent with dry, thin skin that appears red for up to a year or more. The padding of the feet returns but healing can be painful as the nerves repair with characteristics of diabetic neuropathy. Antibiotics and/or antifungal are sometimes prescribed.

Foot immersion is a common problem with homeless individuals wearing one pair of socks and shoes for extensive periods of time, especially wet shoes and sneakers from rain and snow. The condition is exacerbated by excessive dampness of the feet for prolonged periods of time. Fungus and bacterial infections prosper in the warm, dark, wet conditions and are characterized by a sickly odor that is distinct to foot immersion.

== Prevention ==
In the British Army, policies were developed to help the soldiers keep their feet dry—the surest way of preventing the disease. Soldiers were told to dry their feet, and keep them dry by changing socks several times a day. After the first year of the First World War, British troops were instructed to keep at least three pairs of socks with them and to frequently change them. The use of whale oil was also successful in combating trench foot. A British battalion in front line positions could be expected to use ten gallons of whale oil every day.
