= Lysinibacillus timonensis =

Scientific classification
- Domain: Bacteria
- Kingdom: Bacillati
- Phylum: Bacillota
- Class: Bacilli
- Order: Bacillales
- Family: Caryophanaceae
- Genus: Lysinibacillus
- Species: L. timonensis

Binomial name
- Lysinibacillus timonensis Ndiaye et al. 2019

Bacterium of genus of Lysinibacillus

Lysinibacillus timonensis is a bacterium from the genus of Lysinibacillus which has been isolated from human skin.
