= Lysinibacillus yapensis =

Scientific classification
- Domain: Bacteria
- Kingdom: Bacillati
- Phylum: Bacillota
- Class: Bacilli
- Order: Bacillales
- Family: Caryophanaceae
- Genus: Lysinibacillus
- Species: L. yapensis

Binomial name
- Lysinibacillus yapensis Yu et al. 2020

Type strain
- YLB-03

Bacterium of genus of Lysinibacillus

Lysinibacillus yapensis is a Gram-positive, aerobic, spore-forming and motile bacterium from the genus of Lysinibacillus which has been isolated from deep-sea sediments from the Yap Trench.
