= Lysinibacillus alkaliphilus =

Scientific classification
- Domain: Bacteria
- Kingdom: Bacillati
- Phylum: Bacillota
- Class: Bacilli
- Order: Bacillales
- Family: Caryophanaceae
- Genus: Lysinibacillus
- Species: L. alkaliphilus

Binomial name
- Lysinibacillus alkaliphilus Zhao et al. 2015

Type strain
- OMN17

Synonyms
- Lysinibacillus fengqiuensis

Bacterium of genus of Lysinibacillus

Lysinibacillus alkaliphilus is a Gram-positive, aerobic, extremely alkaliphilic and endospore-forming bacterium from the genus of Lysinibacillus.
