= Tropical ulcer =

Type of chronic ulcerative skin lesion

- Other names: Aden ulcer, Jungle rot, Malabar ulcer, Tropical phagedena
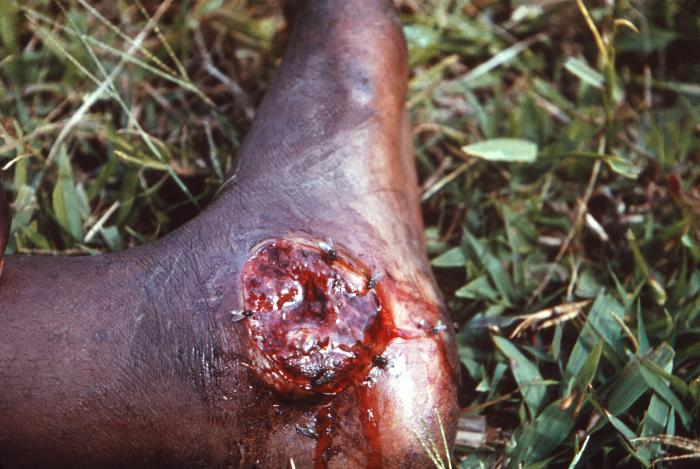
- The left foot of a person with acute tropical ulcer upon his admission to Toborra Goroka Hospital, in Goroka, Papua New Guinea.
- Specialty: Dermatology

Tropical ulcer, more commonly known as jungle rot, is a chronic ulcerative skin lesion thought to be caused by polymicrobial infection with a variety of microorganisms, including mycobacteria. It is common in tropical climates.

Ulcers occur on exposed parts of the body, primarily on anterolateral aspect of the lower limbs and may erode muscles and tendons, and sometimes, the bones. These lesions may frequently develop on preexisting abrasions or sores sometimes beginning from a mere scratch.

== Signs and symptoms ==
The vast majority of the tropical ulcers occur below the knee, usually around the ankle. They may also occur on arms. They are often initiated by minor trauma, and subjects with poor nutrition are at higher risk. Once developed, the ulcer may become chronic and stable, but also it can run a destructive course with deep tissue invasion, osteitis, and risk of amputation. Unlike Buruli ulcer, tropical ulcers are very painful. Lesions begin with inflammatory papules that progress into vesicles and rupture with the formation of an ulcer. Chronic ulcers involve larger areas and may eventually develop into squamous epithelioma after 10 years or more.

=== Complications ===
- Skin color: Rarely, jungle rot will result in complications with skin pigmentation. It has been known to leave the victim with different colors such as bright red, blue, green, and a rare color change of orange.
- Deep tissue invasion: Infection may spread deep to the subcutaneous tissue, but rarely involve the bone.
- Chronic ulceration: Characterised by thick rim of fibrous tissue around the ulcer edges.
- Recurrent ulceration: Most commonly in children.
- Squamous cell carcinoma: May develop at the rate of 2 to 15% of the chronic ulcers that persists for more than three years.
- Tetanus: By entry of tetanus bacilli through the ulcer.

== Microbiology ==
There is now considerable evidence to suggest that this disease is an infection. Mycobacterium ulcerans has recently been isolated from lesions and is unique to tropical ulcers. Early lesions may be colonized or infected by Bacillus fusiformis (Vincent's organism), anaerobes and spirochaetes. Later, tropical ulcer may become infected with a variety of organisms, notably, staphylococci and/or streptococci. The condition has been shown to be transmissible by inoculation of material from affected patients.

== Prevention ==
Adequate footwear is important to prevent trauma. General good health and nutrition also reduce ulcer risk. Adequate and prompt cleansing and treatment of ankle and leg skin breaks is also important. Improving hygiene and nutrition may help to prevent tropical ulcers.

== Treatment ==
- Antibiotics: In early stages, penicillin or metronidazole are used in combination with topical antiseptic.
- Improved nutrition and vitamins.
- Non-adherent dressings and elevation of limbs.
- Large infected ulcers may require debridement under anesthesia.
- Skin grafting may be helpful in advanced cases to ensure the lesion does not progress to chronic stage.
- In extreme cases, amputation is necessary.

== Epidemiology ==
Tropical ulcer has been described as a disease of the 'poor and hungry'; it may be that slowly improving socioeconomic conditions and nutrition account for its decline. Urbanization of populations could be another factor, as a tropical ulcer is usually a rural problem. More widespread use of shoes and socks also provides protection from initiating trauma. Despite this, susceptible individuals still develop tropical ulcers. Sometimes outbreaks can occur; one was recorded in Tanzania in sugarcane workers cutting the crops while barefoot. Tropical ulcers can also occur to the visitors of tropics. The disease is most common in native laborers and in schoolchildren of the tropics and subtropics during the rainy season and is caused in many instances by the bites of insects, poor hygiene, and pyogenic infections. Males are more commonly infected than females.

=== Geographic distribution ===
Tropical ulcer is seen throughout the tropics and subtropics. In some of these countries, such as northern Papua New Guinea, it is the most common skin disease.

== See also ==
- Skin lesion
- Trench foot, sometimes also known as Jungle Rot
