= Trench foot =

Injury to the foot due to poor circulation, cold and moisture

- Other names: Immersion foot
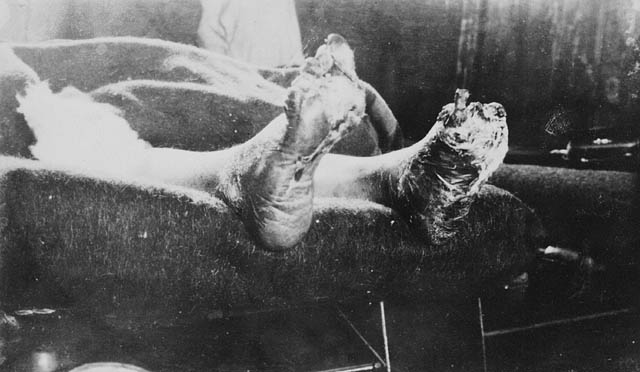
- Trench foot as seen on an unidentified soldier during World War I
- Specialty: Emergency medicine, podiatry
- Symptoms: Tingling, itching, numbness or pain in feet
- Complications: Infection
- Causes: Prolonged exposure of feet in damp environments
- Treatment: Keeping feet dry, surgical debridement

Trench foot, also known by other names, is a type of foot damage due to moisture. Initial symptoms often include tingling or itching which can progress to numbness. The feet may become red or bluish in color. As the condition worsens the feet can start to swell and smell of decay. Complications may include skin breakdown or infection.

Trench foot occurs through prolonged exposure of the feet to cold, damp, and often unsanitary conditions. Unlike frostbite, trench foot usually occurs at temperatures above freezing, and can be classed as a form of non-freezing cold injury. Onset can be as rapid as 10 hours. Risk factors include overly tight boots and not moving. The underlying mechanism is believed to involve constriction of blood vessels resulting in insufficient blood flow to the feet. Diagnosis is based on symptoms and examination.

Prevention involves keeping the feet warm, dry, and clean. After the condition has occurred, pain medications may be required during the gradual rewarming process. Pain may persist for months following treatment. Surgery to remove damaged tissue or amputation may be necessary.

Those in the military are most commonly affected, though cases also occur among homeless people. The condition was first described during Napoleon Bonaparte's retreat from Russia in the winter of 1812.

== Names ==
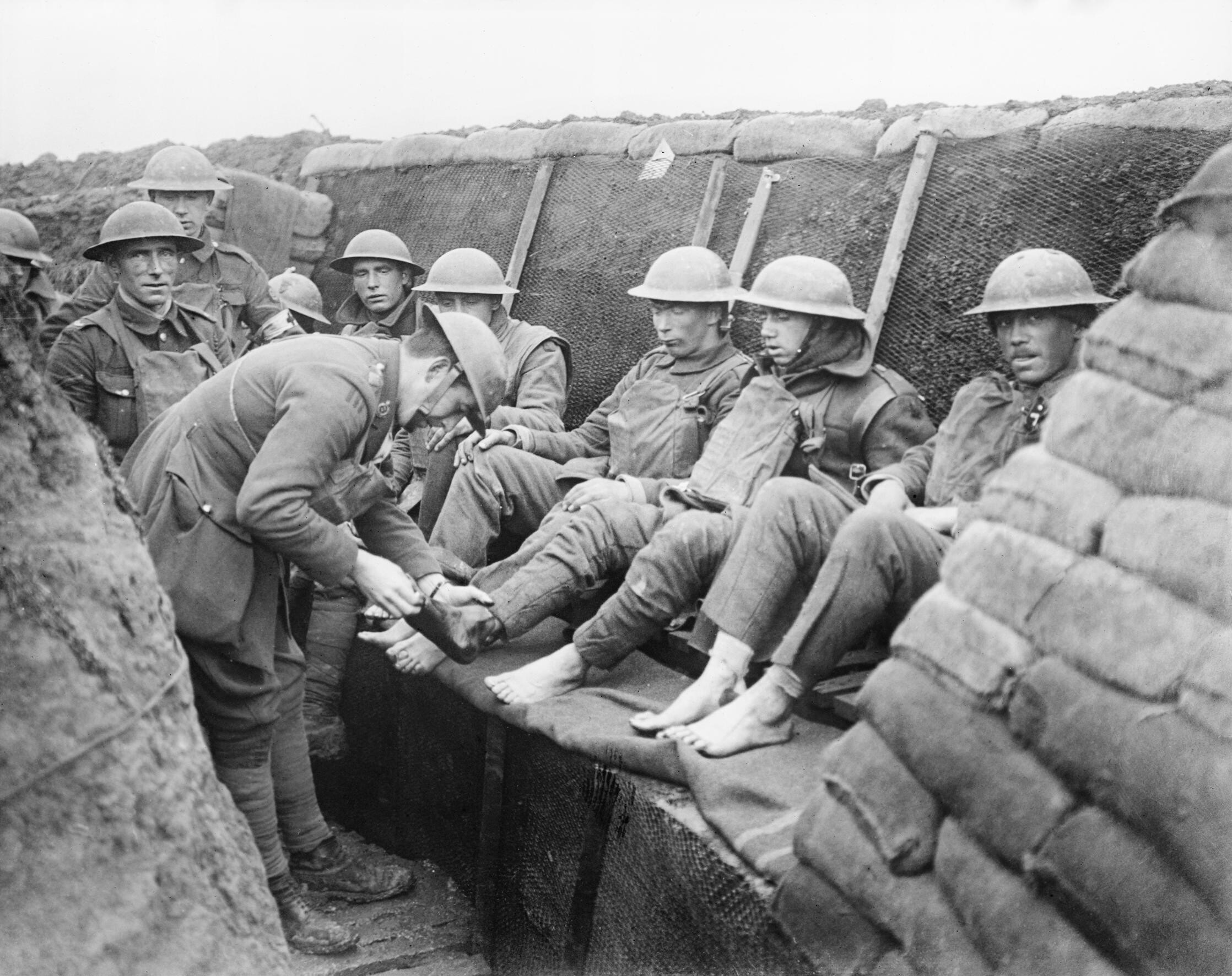
A medical officer conducts a foot inspection in a support trench near Roclincourt, 9 January 1918

Trench foot was an informal name applied to the condition from its prevalence during the trench warfare of World War I. Health officials at the time used a variety of other terms as they studied the condition, but trench foot was eventually formally sanctioned and used. Informally, it was also known as jungle rot during the Vietnam War.

It is also known as immersion foot syndrome and as a nonfreezing cold injury.

== Signs and symptoms ==
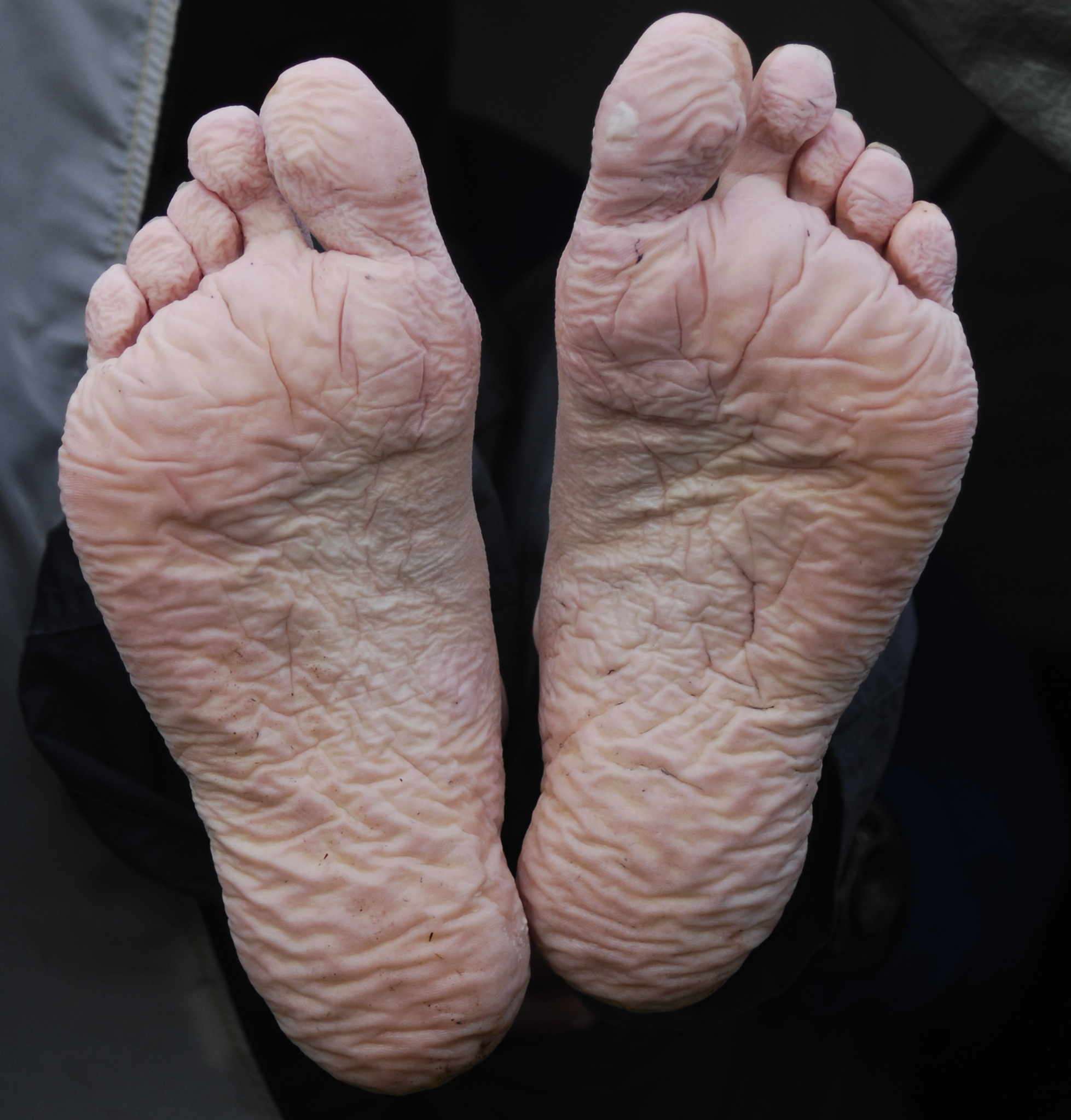
Mild case of trench foot

Trench foot frequently begins with the feeling of tingling and an itch in affected feet, and subsequently progresses to numbness or pain. The feet may become red or blue as a result of poor blood supply. Later, as the condition worsens, feet can start to swell and smell of decay as muscle and tissue become macerated. The feet often feel warm to the touch.

Advanced trench foot often involves blisters and open sores, which lead to fungal infections; this is sometimes called jungle rot. It is marked by severe short-term pain when feeling returns.

== Causes ==
Unlike frostbite, trench foot does not require freezing temperatures. It can occur in temperatures up to 16 °C (61 °F) and within as little as 10 hours. Exposure to these environmental conditions causes deterioration and destruction of the capillaries and leads to damage of the surrounding flesh. Excessive sweating (hyperhidrosis) has long been regarded as a contributory cause. Unsanitary, cold, and wet conditions can also cause trench foot.

== Diagnosis ==
The diagnosis of trench foot does not usually require any investigations unless an underlying infection of bone is suspected, when an X-ray is performed. A full blood count might show a high white blood cell count if infection is present and inflammatory markers such as an erythrocyte sedimentation rate or C-reactive protein (CRP) might highlight severity.

== Prevention ==
Trench foot can be prevented by keeping the feet clean, warm, and dry.

== Treatment ==
Keeping the feet dry is the first line treatment. The initial aim is to protect undamaged tissue of the feet and prevent any further destruction of the feet. Applying emollient helps.

The mainstay of treatment—as with gangrene—is surgical debridement. Severe cases may require amputation.

Self-treatment consists of changing socks two or three times a day and usage of plenty of talcum powder. Whenever possible, shoes and socks should be taken off, the feet bathed for five minutes and patted dry, talcum powder applied, and feet elevated to let air get to them.

== History ==
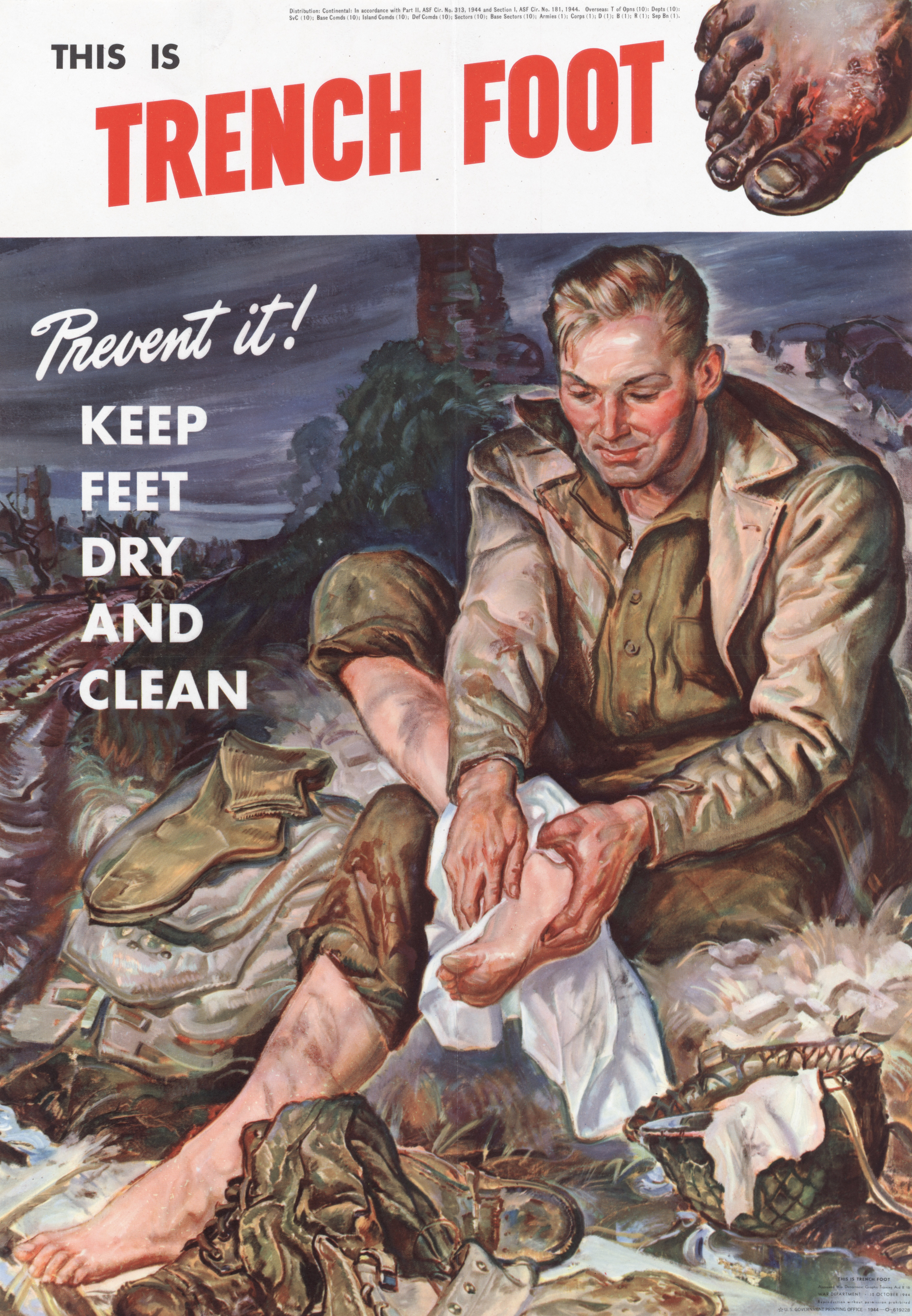
Office of War Information – WWII

Trench foot was first reported in 1812 by the French army surgeon Dominique Jean Larrey when Napoleon’s army was retreating from Russia. It was also a problem for soldiers engaged in trench warfare during World War I, particularly during the winters. Official statistics put the casualty figure for the condition at around 75,000 for the British and 2,000 for the Americans. Amputation was avoided if at all possible and the incidence of trench foot had greatly reduced by the winter of 1917–1918 through improvements to the trenches, modification of soldiers' footwear, and the provision of greases—chiefly whale oil—to prevent damage from excess moisture. It was also discovered that a key preventive measure was regular foot inspections. Rather than leave each soldier to his own devices, they were all paired and each partner made responsible for the feet of the other. As a team, they were more likely to go to the trouble of actually removing their boots and socks, to check for any damage, and to begin treatment at an earlier stage of damage. Trench foot reappeared in the US Army during the Vietnam War in the 1960s and 1970s and in the British Army during the 1982 Falklands War. It has been reported among Ukrainian soldiers in 2022 amid the Russian invasion of Ukraine.

Aside from soldiers, the condition has been documented in coal miners, homeless people, survivors of shipwrecks and plane crashes, as well as music festival attendees at Glastonbury in 1998 and 2007, elderly shut-ins trapped in their baths and hikers.

== See also ==
- Chilblains
- Trench fever
- Tropical ulcer, also known as jungle rot
- Trench mouth, a form of dental gingivitis
