= Planococcus (bacterium) =

Scientific classification
- Domain: Bacteria
- Kingdom: Bacillati
- Phylum: Bacillota
- Class: Bacilli
- Order: Caryophanales
- Family: Caryophanaceae
- Genus: Planococcus; Migula 1894

Type species
- Planococcus citreus Migula 1894

Species
- See text

Synonyms
- Planomicrobium Yoon et al. 2001

Genus of bacteria

Planococcus is a genus of Gram-Positive or Gram-variable, cocci or short rod-shaped bacteria in the family Caryophanaceae from the order Caryophanales. The type species of this genus is Planococcus citreus.

Some members of Planococcus are previously species belonging to Planomicrobium. Instead of branching with species from Planomicrobum, these species formed a monophyletic branch with members of Planococcus in various phylogenetic trees constructed based on conserved genome sequences, indicating their phylogenetic relatedness. The family Caryophanaceae encompassed many branching anomalies such as this one, partially due to the reliance on 16S rRNA sequences as a method for classification, which is known to have low resolution power and give differing results depending on the algorithm used. In 2020, a comparative genomic study emended the family, resulting in the establishment of three new genera as well as the amendment of a number of genera including Planococcus.

The name Planococcus is derived from the Greek noun planes, translating into "a wanderer" and the Latin term coccus. Together, Planococcus can be translated as a motile coccus.

== Biochemical Characteristics and Molecular Signatures ==
Cells exhibit Gram-positive or Gram-variable staining and they are cocci or short rods and generally motile.

Genomic analyses identified five conserved signature indels (CSIs) that are uniquely present in members of this genus in the following proteins: penicillin-binding protein 2, hypothetical protein, NADPH-dependent 7-cyano-7-deazaguanine reductase QueF, ACT domain-containing protein, and methylmalonyl-CoA mutase. These molecular signatures provide a reliable method for differentiating Planococcus species from other genera within the family Caryophanaceae and all other bacteria.

== Phylogeny ==
Planococcus, as of 2021, contains 24 species with validly published names. This genus was identified as a monophyletic clade and phylogenetically unrelated to other species in the family Caryophanaceae in studies examining the taxonomic relationships within the family. The currently accepted taxonomy is based on the List of Prokaryotic names with Standing in Nomenclature (LPSN) and National Center for Biotechnology Information (NCBI)

16S rRNA based LTP_10_2024

- Planococcus
  - P. salinus Gan et al. 2018
  - - P. plakortidis Kaur et al. 2012
    - - - P. maritimus Yoon et al. 2003
        - - - P. columbae Suresh et al. 2007
            - P. maitriensis Alam et al. 2004
          - - P. citreus Menge 1892 ex Migula 1894
            - P. rifietoensis corrig. Romano et al. 2003
      - - P. ruber Wang et al. 2017
        - - P. salinarum Yoon et al. 2010
          - - - - Planomicrobium flavidum Jung et al. 2009
                - P. halotolerans Gan et al. 2018
              - - P. alkanoclasticus Engelhardt et al. 2001
                - - - P. koreensis (Yoon et al. 2001) Gupta & Patel 2020
                    - P. psychrophilus Reddy et al. 2002
                  - - Planomicrobium iranicum Ramezani et al. 2019
                    - - P. mcmeekinii Junge et al. 1998
                      - - P. chinensis (Dai et al. 2005) Gupta & Patel 2020
                        - P. glaciei (Zhang et al. 2009) Gupta & Patel 2020
            - - "P. soli" (Luo et al. 2014) Gupta & Patel 2019 non Zhang et al. 2021
              - - - P. okeanokoites (ZoBell & Upham 1944) Nakagawa, Sakane & Yokota 1996
                  - P. stackebrandtii Mayilraj et al. 2005
                - - - P. donghaensis Choi et al. 2007
                    - - P. halocryophilus Mykytczuk, Wilhelm & Whyte 2012
                      - P. versustus See-Too et al. 2017
                  - - P. antarcticus Reddy et al. 2002
                    - - P. faecalis Kim et al. 2015
                      - P. kocurii Hao & Komagata 1986

120 marker proteins based GTDB 09-RS220

- Planococcus
  - - - P. plakortidis
      - P. maitriensis
    - - P. maritimus
      - - P. citreus
        - P. rifietoensis
  - - P. salinus
    - - - "P. soli" Zhang et al. 2021 non (Luo et al. 2014) Gupta & Patel 2019
        - - P. ruber
          - - P. koreensis
            - - P. chinensis
              - P. glaciei
      - - - - "P. beigongshangi" Hao et al. 2023
            - P. salinarum
          - - P. halotolerans
            - P. okeanokoites
        - - P. wigleyi Pallen 2024
          - - P. stackebrandtii
            - - "P. soli" (Luo et al. 2014) Gupta & Patel 2019 non Zhang et al. 2021
              - - P. antarcticus
                - - P. kocurii
                  - - P. versustus
                    - - P. donghaensis
                      - P. halocryophilus

Unassigned species:

- "P. antioxidans" Zhang et al. 2020
- "P. beijingensis" Hao et al. 2023
- "P. crocinus" Yun & Lee 2007
- "P. dechangensis" Wang et al. 2015
- "P. kazaiensis" Mayilraj & Chakrabarti 2003
- P. notacanthi Uniacke-Lowe et al. 2024
- "P. pelagicus" Mayilraj et al. 2007
- "P. psychrotoleratus" Zhu, Liu & Zhou 2007

== See also ==
- List of bacterial orders
- List of bacteria genera
