= Sporosarcina aquimarina =

Scientific classification
- Domain: Bacteria
- Kingdom: Bacillati
- Phylum: Bacillota
- Class: Bacilli
- Order: Caryophanales
- Family: Caryophanaceae
- Genus: Sporosarcina
- Species: S. aquimarina

Binomial name
- Sporosarcina aquimarina (Nakamura 1984) Yoon et al. 2001

Species of bacterium

Sporosarcina aquimarina is a rod-shaped bacterium of the genus Sporosarcina.

== Characteristics ==
Cells of Sporosarcina aquimarina are 0.9–1.2 μm x 2.0–3.5 μm. It is motile by means of a single polar flagellum. The bacterium forms endospores (like all species of the genus).

== Metabolism ==
Sporosarcina aquimarina is heterotrophic, as it does not perform photosynthesis. It is facultative anaerobe. If oxygen is present the metabolism is due to cellular respiration, but it can also grow anaerobic if oxygen is absent. The species is halophilic. 13% NaCl are still tolerated. Sporosarcina aquimarina is one of the bacteria that can make use of urea with the enzyme urease. Others bacteria of the same genus which possess the enzyme urease are for example S. ureaea und S. pasteurii.

== Etymology ==
The genus name derives from the Greek word spora ("spore") and the Latin word sarcina ("package", "bundle") and refers to the fact that it forms endospores and the typical arrangement of the cells. The species name S. aquimarina derives from the fact that it was found in sea water.

== Systematics ==
The species Sporosarcina aquimarina belongs to the family Planococcaceae of the Bacillota.
