= Amylolyticum =

Amylolyticum may refer to:

- Chryseomicrobium amylolyticum, species of bacteria
- Clostridium amylolyticum, species of bacteria
- Microbacterium amylolyticum, species of bacteria
- Tenacibaculum amylolyticum, species of bacteria
