= Metalysinibacillus =

Scientific classification
- Domain: Bacteria
- Kingdom: Bacillati
- Phylum: Bacillota
- Class: Bacilli
- Order: Caryophanales
- Family: Caryophanaceae
- Genus: Metalysinibacillus; Gupta and Patel 2020

Type species
- Metalysinibacillus jejuensis Gupta & Patel 2020

Species
- M. jejuensis; M. saudimassiliensis

Genus of Gram-positive bacteria

Metalysinibacillus is a genus of Gram-positive rod-shaped bacteria in the family Caryophanaceae from the order Caryophanales. The type species of this genus is Metalysinibacillus jejuensis.

Members of Metalysinibacillus are previously species belonging to Lysinibacillus. Instead of branching with species from Lysinibacillus, these two species formed a monophyletic branch in various phylogenetic trees constructed based on conserved genome sequences, indicating their phylogenetic relatedness. The family Caryophanaceae encompassed many branching anomalies such as this one, partially due to the reliance on 16S rRNA sequences as a method for classification, which is known to have low resolution power and give differing results depending on the algorithm used. In 2020, a comparative genomic study emended the family, resulting in the establishment of three new genera, including Metalysinibacillus.

The name Metalysinibacillus is derived from the Greek adjective meta, translating into "besides" and the Latin term Lysinibacillus, referring the genus name. Together, Metalysinibacillus can be translated as a genus besides Lysinibacillus.

== Biochemical characteristics and molecular signatures ==
Members of this genus are aerobic and endospore-forming. Metalysinibacillus grows optimally in temperatures in the range of 30–37°C. Some species are reported to be positive for catalase and Voges–Proskauer tests.

Analyses of genome sequences from Metalysinibacillus species identified 17 conserved signature indels (CSIs) that are specific for this genus in the following proteins: arginine-binding extracellular protein ArtP precursor, oxygen-independent coproporphyrinogen III oxidase, putative hydrolase MhqD, helix-turn-helix transcriptional regulator, tRNA preQ1(34)S-adenosylmethionine ribosyltransferase-isomerase QueA, DNA primase, FMN reductase (NADPH), UvrABC system protein C, sensor histidine kinase YycG, hypothetical proteins, ribonuclease Y, cell division protein FtsA, ABC transporter ATP- binding protein YtrB, cysteine–tRNA ligase, coproporphyrinogen III oxidase, and PBP1A family penicillin-binding protein. These molecular signatures provide a reliable method of identification and differentiation of Metalysinibacillus species from other genera in the family Caryophanaceae and all other bacteria.

== Taxonomy ==
Metalysinibacillus, as of 2021, contains one species with a validly published name. This genus was identified as a monophyletic clade and phylogenetically unrelated to other species in the family Caryophanaceae in studies examining the taxonomic relationships within the family.

There is one other species that is non-validly published, but are considered to be a member of this genus due to shared molecular markers and grouping on phylogenetic trees with the type species.

== Phylogeny ==
The currently accepted taxonomy is based on the List of Prokaryotic names with Standing in Nomenclature (LPSN) and National Center for Biotechnology Information (NCBI)

16S rRNA based LTP_10_2024

- - Metalysinibacillus jejuensis
  - Lysinibacillus alkalisoli

120 marker proteins based GTDB 09-RS220

- Metalysinibacillus
  - Lysinibacillus alkalisoli Sun, Xu & Wu 2017
  - - M. jejuensis Gupta & Patel 2020
    - M. saudimassiliensis Gupta & Patel 2019

== See also ==
- List of bacterial orders
- List of bacteria genera
