= Planococcus =

Planococcus may refer to:

- Planococcus (bug), a genus of bugs in the family Pseudococcidae
- Planococcus (bacterium), a genus of bacteria in the family Planococcaceae
