= Filibacter =

Scientific classification
- Domain: Bacteria
- Kingdom: Bacillati
- Phylum: Bacillota
- Class: Bacilli
- Order: Caryophanales
- Family: Caryophanaceae
- Genus: Filibacter; Maiden and Jones 1985

Type species
- Filibacter limicola

Species
- F. limicola

Genus of bacteria

Filibacter is a Gram-negative strictly aerobic bacteria genus from the family of Planococcaceae. Up to now there iso only one species of this genus known (Filibacter limicola).
