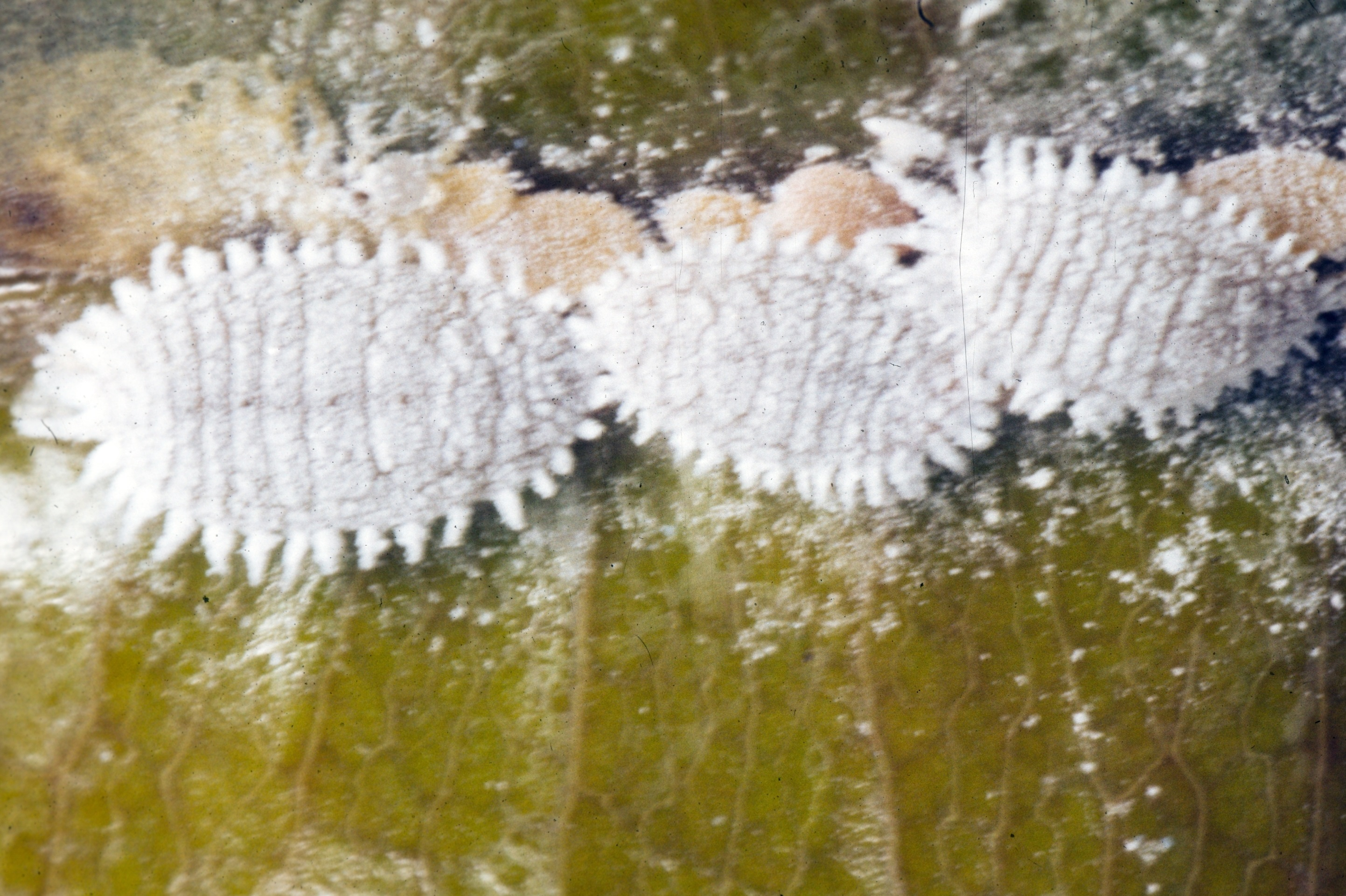

Scientific classification
- Kingdom: Animalia
- Phylum: Arthropoda
- Clade: Pancrustacea
- Class: Insecta
- Order: Hemiptera
- Suborder: Sternorrhyncha
- Family: Pseudococcidae
- Genus: Planococcus
- Species: P. citri

Binomial name
- Planococcus citri Risso, 1813

= Planococcus citri =

Species of true bug

Planococcus citri, commonly known as the citrus mealybug, is a species of mealybugs native to Asia. It has been introduced to the rest of the world, including Europe, the Americas, and Oceania, as an agricultural pest. It is associated with citrus, but it attacks a wide range of crop plants, ornamental plants, and wild flora.

== Description ==
Mealybugs are sexually dimorphic. The adult female citrus mealybug is about 3 mm (0.12 in) long with a white, brownish, or pink body covered in white wax. The edges of the body are lined with waxy filaments. It has a light gray longitudinal line down its back. Its legs and antennae are brown. The adult female lacks wings and resembles a nymph. The adult male is slightly larger, has long wax filaments on the posterior end of the body, and has functional wings. In flight the male resembles a gnat.

The female deposits masses of eggs on plants. The masses, known as ovisacs, are covered in fluffy, cottony layers of wax filaments. The ovisac can contain up to 20 shiny yellowish, pink, or amber eggs each about 0.3 mm (0.012 in) long. The first-instar nymph is called a crawler. It is yellowish with red eyes and has a wax coating. Crawlers are active and gregarious. The female nymph resembles the adult female, while the male nymph is longer and narrower. As they develop, the female nymph progresses through more instars than the male, and the male undergoes a pre-pupal stage. The male constructs a cottony cocoon for pupation, and the female does not.

The citrus mealybug looks very similar to the vine mealybug (Planococcus ficus), and the two species are mainly distinguished by the arrangement of pores and tubular ducts on the tiny body of the female. This similarity can pose a problem in agriculture. For example, when growers are ready to attempt biological pest control of either mealybug, the use of molecular analysis is recommended to confirm the identity of the species so an appropriate parasitoid can be employed.

== Taxonomy ==
Planococcus citri was first described in 1813 by the Niçard naturalist Antoine Risso. It belongs to the genus Planococcus in the mealybug family Pseudococcidae. They are classified under the superfamily Coccoidea (scale insects) in the order Hemiptera (true bugs).

== Biology ==
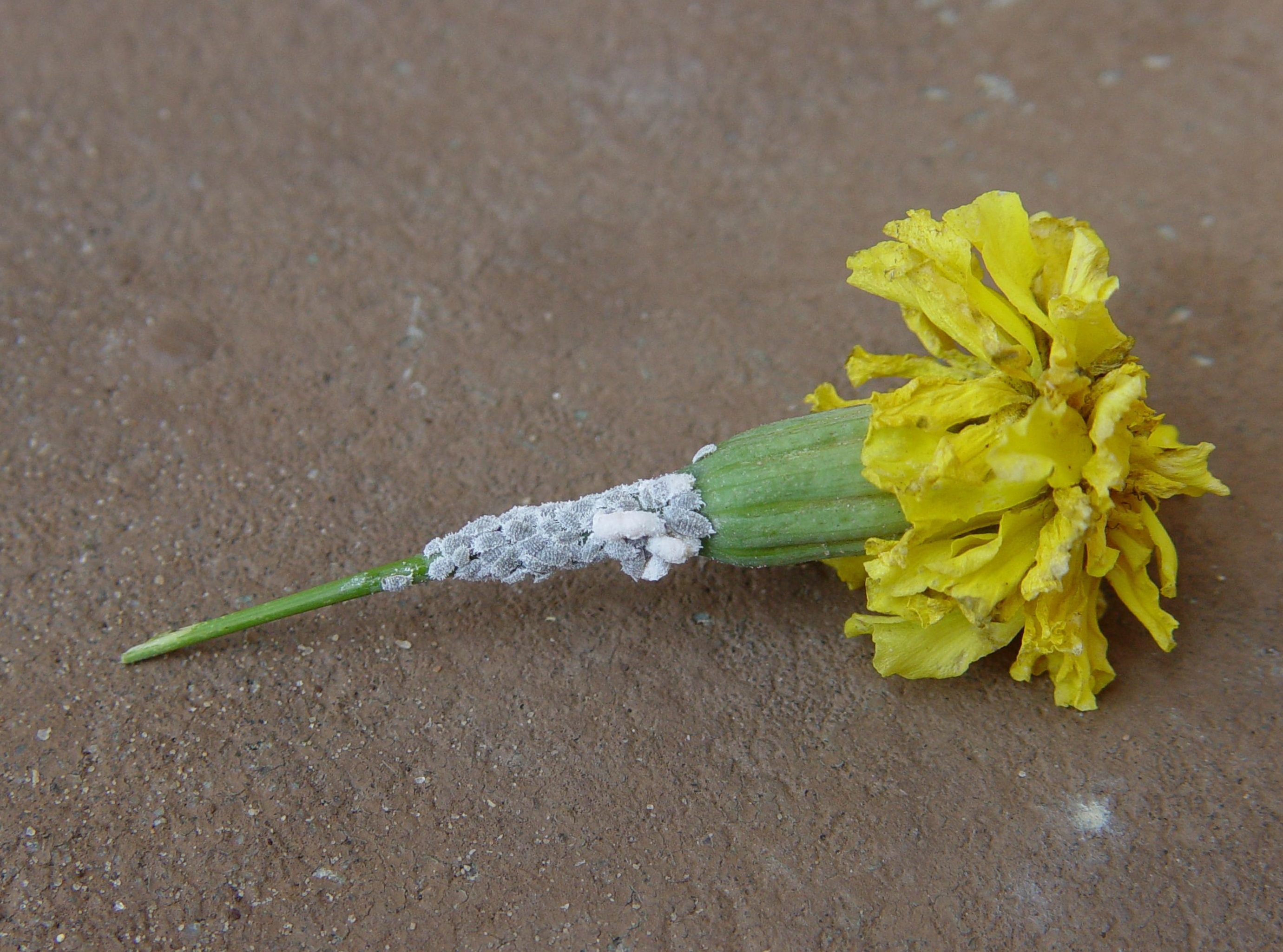
Infesting a marigold

The longevity of the adult depends on temperature, but while females live for several weeks, males live fewer than three days in adult form. During this time, the male does not feed. It takes flight with its single pair of wings and seeks females. The female spends its longer lifetime feeding and producing eggs. Most other aspects of the life cycle depend on temperature, as well, including egg mortality, nymph mortality, rate of development, sex ratio, fecundity, and the length of the egg-laying period.

During mating, the citrus mealybug is known to engage in "triple coitus"; a female may copulate with two males at the same time, and a third male may at least make attempts to join the process. Males spend the one or two days of their adult lives mating, and have been observed achieving copulation with up to 23 females, with an average of about nine.

There are usually several generations per year. The mealybug is most common in spring and summer, its populations fluctuating according to temperature and available host plants. Peak abundance is noted in early summer in Florida citrus. Mealybugs infesting plants in the constant conditions of greenhouses have stable, steadily reproducing populations all year.

All mealybug species investigated so far have endosymbionts: symbiotic bacteria that live inside their bodies and synthesize useful compounds such as amino acids that the insect can utilize. Most mealybugs examined contain the betaproteobacterium Candidatus Tremblaya princeps. Other bacterial taxa have recently been found in mealybugs, as well. The citrus mealybug has a nested endosymbiosis. Its resident Ca. T. princeps contain their own endosymbionts, the gammaproteobacterium Candidatus Moranella endobia. This "matryoshka" nested arrangement of a bacterium inside a bacterium inside an insect has been compared to the structure of a cell. Ca. T. princeps has almost no metabolic functions except for the production of amino acids, having lost the genes for most other life functions. It relies on Ca. M. endobia for energy, and is even unable to reproduce without it. Ca. T. princeps attracted attention when genetic analysis revealed that it has the smallest genome of any bacterium studied thus far. At 139 kilo-base pairs, it has only about 120 genes, which helps to explain why it cannot function without its endosymbiont.

== Impacts ==
The citrus mealybug can live "on almost any flowering plant". It is considered a citrus pest with a preference for grapefruit, but it has been found on plants from almost 70 families. It is found on fruit, vegetable, and other food crops, including pineapple, sugar-apple, coconut, melon, yam, figs, strawberry, sweet potato, mangoes, bananas, avocado, date palm, common guava, pomegranate, common pear, apple, eggplant, cacao tree, and soybean. It infests ornamental plants, including indoor plants, and it is common in greenhouses. It is found on Amaryllis, Begonia, Bougainvillea, Canna, Cyclamen, Impatiens, Narcissus, Nicotiana, cacti, coleus, croton, sedges, dahlias, spurges, gardenias, roses, and tulips.

Adult females and nymphs suck sap with their piercing mouthparts. This leads to plant damage in the form of wilting and chlorosis of the foliage, leaf drop, stunted growth, and sometimes the death of the plant. Fruits such as oranges become lumpy and discolored when the insect feeds on them, and they may fall off the tree. Insects packed with harvested fruits continue to feed, causing more losses during shipping. The mealybug secretes honeydew, which coats leaves and fruits and causes the growth of sooty molds. A layer of mold can reduce the ability of a leaf to perform photosynthesis, and makes fruit unmarketable. The citrus mealybug is also a vector for plant viruses.

== Management ==
In agriculture, the insect can be managed with cultural, biological, and chemical control methods. Keeping orchard trees clipped so that they do not touch each other may help slow the spread. Cleaning farm equipment and other objects used in the field can help prevent its transport. Few insecticides are known to be very effective on mealybugs, because they can hide and avoid spraying, their wax layers resist some chemicals, and their overlapping generations prevent complete control.

Insecticide treatment has two major problems: P. citri has developed resistance to some of them, and control of P. citri is heavily dependent on natural enemies whose numbers are reduced or eliminated by the same insecticides. Chlorpyrifos is commonly used, but in Tunisia a high degree of resistance has developed, possibly due to repetitive use. In an attempt to forestall resistance, California commonly uses chlorpyrifos only during P. citri dormancy or as a postharvest treatment. (California's vineyards being in a similar climate to Tunisia, they are concerned about suffering a similar fate.)

A variety of natural enemies exist. One survey in Egypt noted 12 species of parasitoid wasps on the citrus mealybug. It also recorded nine predatory insects, including ladybird beetles, moths, a gall midge, and a green lacewing.

Agents of biological control include a number of parasitoid wasps that attack the nymphs, including Leptomastidea abnormis, Leptomastix dactylopii, Chrysoplatycerus splendens, and Anagyrus pseudococci. Predators include the brown lacewing Sympherobius barberi, the green lacewing Chrysopa lateralis, hoverfly larvae, and the scale-feeding snout-moth larva. The mealybug destroyer (Cryptolaemus montrouzieri), a ladybird beetle, readily attacks the citrus mealybug.

Another option is a sticky trap baited with the sex pheromone of the species to capture males. The pheromone has been isolated and synthesized, and is commercially available.

== See also ==
- Nasuia deltocephalinicola
