= Solibacillus silvestris =

Scientific classification
- Domain: Bacteria
- Kingdom: Bacillati
- Phylum: Bacillota
- Class: Bacilli
- Order: Caryophanales
- Family: Caryophanaceae
- Genus: Solibacillus
- Species: S. silvestris

Binomial name
- Solibacillus silvestris (Rheims et al. 1999) Krishnamurthi et al. 2009<

Type strain
- ATCC BAA-269, CIP 106059, DSM 12223, LMG 18991, strain HR3-23

Synonyms
- Bacillus silvestris

Genus of bacteria

Solibacillus silvestris is a Gram-positive, aerobic and rod-shaped bacterium from the genus of Solibacillus which has been isolated from forest soil near Braunschweig in Germany.
