= Sporosarcina luteola =

Scientific classification
- Domain: Bacteria
- Kingdom: Bacillati
- Phylum: Bacillota
- Class: Bacilli
- Order: Caryophanales
- Family: Caryophanaceae
- Genus: Sporosarcina
- Species: S. luteola

Binomial name
- Sporosarcina luteola Tominaga et al. 2009

Type strain
- JCM 15791, NBRC 105378, NCIMB 14541, NRRL B-59180, strain Y1

Genus of bacteria

Sporosarcina luteola is a Gram-variable, spore-forming and motile bacterium from the genus of Sporosarcina which has been isolated from equipment used for soy sauce production in Japan.
