= Chryseomicrobium excrementi =

Scientific classification
- Domain: Bacteria
- Kingdom: Bacillati
- Phylum: Bacillota
- Class: Bacilli
- Order: Caryophanales
- Family: Caryophanaceae
- Genus: Chryseomicrobium
- Species: C. excrementi

Binomial name
- Chryseomicrobium excrementi Saha et al. 2018

Type strain
- JCM 32415, KCTC 33943, LMG 30119, strain ET03

Species of bacterium

Chryseomicrobium excrementi is a Gram-positive, rod-shaped, slightly halotolerant and nitrate-reducing bacterium from the genus Chryseomicrobium which has been isolated from the cast of an earthworm (Eisenia fetida) from the University of North Bengal at Siliguri in India.
