= Sporosarcina newyorkensis =

Scientific classification
- Domain: Bacteria
- Kingdom: Bacillati
- Phylum: Bacillota
- Class: Bacilli
- Order: Caryophanales
- Family: Caryophanaceae
- Genus: Sporosarcina
- Species: S. newyorkensis

Binomial name
- Sporosarcina newyorkensis Wolfgang et al. 2012

Type strain
- CCUG 59649, DSM 23544, LMG 26022, strain 6062

Genus of bacteria

Sporosarcina newyorkensis is a Gram-positive and endospore-forming bacterium from the genus of Sporosarcina which has been isolated from human blood and raw cow milk.
