= Bhargavaea ginsengi =

Scientific classification
- Domain: Bacteria
- Kingdom: Bacillati
- Phylum: Bacillota
- Class: Bacilli
- Order: Caryophanales
- Family: Caryophanaceae
- Genus: Bhargavaea
- Species: B. ginsengi

Binomial name
- Bhargavaea ginsengi (Qiu et al. 2009) Verma et al. 2012

Type strain
- CGMCC 1.6763, DSM 19038, ge14

Synonyms
- Bacillus ginsengi

Species of bacterium

Bhargavaea ginsengi is a Gram-positive, moderately halotolerant and non-motile bacterium from the genus Bhargavaea which has been isolated from the roots of a ginseng plant in Beijing in China.
