= Sporosarcina globispora =

Scientific classification
- Domain: Bacteria
- Kingdom: Bacillati
- Phylum: Bacillota
- Class: Bacilli
- Order: Caryophanales
- Family: Caryophanaceae
- Genus: Sporosarcina
- Species: S. globispora

Binomial name
- Sporosarcina globispora (Larkin and Stokes 1967) Yoon et al. 2001

Species of bacterium

Sporosarcina globispora, formerly known as Bacillus globisporus, is a Gram-positive, aerobic, round spore-forming bacillus. Strains of this species were originally described in 1967 and were found to be fairly similar to the species Bacillus pantothenticus. The species was later reassigned to the genus Sporosarcina along with the species Bacillus psychrophilus and Bacillus pasteurii.
