= Sporosarcina contaminans =

Scientific classification
- Domain: Bacteria
- Kingdom: Bacillati
- Phylum: Bacillota
- Class: Bacilli
- Order: Caryophanales
- Family: Caryophanaceae
- Genus: Sporosarcina
- Species: S. contaminans

Binomial name
- Sporosarcina contaminans Kämpfer et al. 2010

Type strain
- CCUG 53915, DSM 22204, CCUG 53915

Genus of bacteria

Sporosarcina contaminans is a Gram-positive and endospore-forming bacterium from the genus of Sporosarcina which has been isolated from an industrial clean-room floor from Gothenburg in Sweden.
