= Paenisporosarcina antarctica =

Scientific classification
- Domain: Bacteria
- Kingdom: Bacillati
- Phylum: Bacillota
- Class: Bacilli
- Order: Bacillales
- Family: Caryophanaceae
- Genus: Paenisporosarcina
- Species: P. antarctica

Binomial name
- Paenisporosarcina antarctica (Wu et al. 2008) Reddy et al. 2013

Type strain
- CGMCC 1.6503, JCM 14646, strain N-05

Synonyms
- Sporosarcina antarctica

Genus of bacteria

Paenisporosarcina antarctica is a psychrophilic, Gram-positive and rod-shaped bacterium from the genus of Paenisporosarcina which has been isolated from soil from the King George Island.
