= Sporosarcina saromensis =

Scientific classification
- Domain: Bacteria
- Kingdom: Bacillati
- Phylum: Bacillota
- Class: Bacilli
- Order: Caryophanales
- Family: Caryophanaceae
- Genus: Sporosarcina
- Species: S. saromensis

Binomial name
- Sporosarcina saromensis An et al. 2007

Type strain
- IAM 15429, JCM 23205, KCTC 13119, MBIC 08270, NBRC 103571, HG645

Genus of bacteria

Sporosarcina saromensis is a Gram-positive, endospore-forming, rod-shaped and aerobic bacterium from the genus of Sporosarcina.
