= N-carbamoylase =

N-carbamoylase may refer to the following enzymes:

- N-carbamoyl-D-amino acid hydrolase
- N-carbamoyl-L-amino-acid hydrolase
