= Sporosarcina terrae =

Scientific classification
- Domain: Bacteria
- Kingdom: Bacillati
- Phylum: Bacillota
- Class: Bacilli
- Order: Caryophanales
- Family: Caryophanaceae
- Genus: Sporosarcina
- Species: S. terrae

Binomial name
- Sporosarcina terrae Sun et al. 2017

Type strain
- KACC 18822, MCCC 1K03174, strain LZ2

Species of bacterium

Sporosarcina terrae is a species of Gram-positive, non-motile, rod-shaped bacterium in the genus Sporosarcina. It was first isolated from orchard soil collected in Laizhou, Shandong Province, China.

== See also ==
- Sporosarcina
- List of bacterial orders
- List of Gram-positive bacteria
