= Bhargavaea cecembensis =

Scientific classification
- Domain: Bacteria
- Kingdom: Bacillati
- Phylum: Bacillota
- Class: Bacilli
- Order: Caryophanales
- Family: Caryophanaceae
- Genus: Bhargavaea
- Species: B. cecembensis

Binomial name
- Bhargavaea cecembensis Manorama et al. 2009

Type strain
- DSE10, JCM 14375, LMG 24411

Species of bacterium

Bhargavaea beijingensis is a Gram-positive, non-spore-forming, rod-shaped and non-motile bacterium from the genus Bhargavaea which has been isolated from deep-sea sediments from the Chagos-Laccadive Ridge from the Indian Ocean.
