= Calidifontibacillus =

Scientific classification
- Domain: Bacteria
- Kingdom: Bacillati
- Phylum: Bacillota
- Class: Bacilli
- Order: Bacillales
- Family: Bacillaceae
- Genus: Calidifontibacillus; Adiguzel et al. 2020

Type species
- Calidifontibacillus erzurumensis Adiguzel et al. 2020

Species
- C. erzurumensis

Genus of bacteria

Calidifontibacillus is a genus of bacteria from the family of Bacillaceae.

== Phylogeny ==
The currently accepted taxonomy is based on the List of Prokaryotic names with Standing in Nomenclature (LPSN) and National Center for Biotechnology Information (NCBI)

16S rRNA based LTP_10_2024

- - Calidifontibacillus erzurumensis Adiguzel et al. 2020
  - - Schinkia
      - S. azotoformans (Pichinoty et al. 1983) Gupta et al. 2020
      - S. oryziterrae (Bao et al. 2017) Gupta et al. 2020

120 marker proteins based GTDB 09-RS220

- Schinkiaceae
  - Calidifontibacillus oryziterrae (Bao et al. 2017) Adiguzel et al. 2020
  - - Calidifontibacillus erzurumensis Adiguzel et al. 2020
    - Schinkia azotoformans (Pichinoty et al. 1983) Gupta et al. 2020

== See also ==
- List of bacterial orders
- List of bacteria genera
