= Schinkia =

Scientific classification
- Domain: Bacteria
- Kingdom: Bacillati
- Phylum: Bacillota
- Class: Bacilli
- Order: Caryophanales
- Family: Bacillaceae
- Genus: Schinkia; Gupta et al. 2020

Type species
- Schinkia azotoformans (Pichinoty et al. 1983) Gupta et al. 2020

Species
- S. azotoformans; S. oryziterrae

Genus of Gram-positive bacteria

Schinkia is a genus of Gram-positive rod-shaped bacteria in the family Bacillaceae from the order Bacillales. The type species of this genus is Schinkia azotoformans.

Members of Schinkia are previously species belonging to Bacillus, a genus that has been recognized as displaying extensive polyphyly and phylogenetic heterogeneity due to the vague criteria (such as the ability to form endospores in the presence of oxygen) previously used to assign species to this clade. Multiple studies using comparative phylogenetic analyses have been published in an attempt to clarify the evolutionary relationships between Bacillus species, resulting in the establishment of numerous novel genera such as Alkalihalobacillus, Brevibacillus, Solibacillus, Alicyclobacillus, Virgibacillus, and Evansella. In addition, the genus Bacillus has been restricted to only include species closely related to Bacillus subtilis and Bacillus cereus.

The name Schinkia was named after German microbiologist Professor Bernard Schink, University of Konstanz, for his studies of diverse microorganisms and his contributions in the discipline of microbial taxonomy.

== Biochemical characteristics and molecular signatures ==
Members of this genus are aerobic or facultatively anaerobic and found in soil. All members can produce endospores and are motile by means of peritrichous flagella. Schinkia can grow in temperatures ranging from 20°C to 46°C but the optimal growth temperature is in the range of 30-40°C. Members of this genus are industrially significant as Schinkia azotoformans is able to produce nitrogen (N_{2}) by co-denitrification, and Schinkia oryziterrae is a selenium nanoparticle-producing and nitrate-reducing bacterium.

13 conserved signature indels were identified for this genus in the following proteins: leucyl aminopeptidase, helicase-exonuclease AddAB subunit AddA, class I SAM-dependent methyltransferase, N-acetylalpha-d-glucosaminyl l-malate synthase BshA, YpdA family putative bacillithiol disulfide reductase, penicillin-binding protein 2, type II/IV secretion system protein, ammonia-forming cytochrome c nitrite reductase subunit c552, hydroxymethylbilane synthase, acetolactate synthase large subunit, hypothetical protein, DEAD/ DEAH box helicase and UDP-N-acetylmuramoyl-l-alanyld-glutamate-2,6-diaminopimelate ligase, which in most cases are exclusively shared by either all or most members of this genus. These conserved signature indels were identified through analyses of genome sequences from Schinkia species and can be used to reliably demarcate this genus from other Bacillaceae genera and bacteria in molecular terms.

== Phylogeny ==
The currently accepted taxonomy is based on the List of Prokaryotic names with Standing in Nomenclature (LPSN) and National Center for Biotechnology Information (NCBI) and as of May 2021, contains a total of 2 species with validly published names. This genus was identified as a monophyletic clade and phylogenetically unrelated to other Bacillus species in studies examining the taxonomic relationships within Bacillus. This branching pattern is also observed in the Genome Taxonomy Database (GTDB).

16S rRNA based LTP_10_2024

- - Calidifontibacillus erzurumensis Adiguzel et al. 2020
  - - Schinkia
      - S. azotoformans (Pichinoty et al. 1983) Gupta et al. 2020
      - S. oryziterrae (Bao et al. 2017) Gupta et al. 2020

120 marker proteins based GTDB 09-RS220

- Schinkiaceae
  - Calidifontibacillus oryziterrae (Bao et al. 2017) Adiguzel et al. 2020
  - - Calidifontibacillus erzurumensis Adiguzel et al. 2020
    - Schinkia azotoformans (Pichinoty et al. 1983) Gupta et al. 2020
