= Kurthia huakuii =

Scientific classification
- Domain: Bacteria
- Kingdom: Bacillati
- Phylum: Bacillota
- Class: Bacilli
- Order: Caryophanales
- Family: Caryophanaceae
- Genus: Kurthia
- Species: K. huakuii

Binomial name
- Kurthia huakuii Ruan et al. 2014

Type strain
- ACCC 06121, JCM 19187, strain LAM0618

Species of bacterium

Kurthia huakuii is a Gram-positive, facultatively anaerobic, spore-forming, short rod-shaped and motile bacterium from the genus Kurthia which has been isolated from biogas slurry from the Hebei Province in China.
