= Tenacibaculum aestuariivivum =

Scientific classification
- Domain: Bacteria
- Kingdom: Pseudomonadati
- Phylum: Bacteroidota
- Class: Flavobacteriia
- Order: Flavobacteriales
- Family: Flavobacteriaceae
- Genus: Tenacibaculum
- Species: T. aestuariivivum

Binomial name
- Tenacibaculum aestuariivivum Park et al. 2017

Type strain
- KCTC 52980, KCTC 52980

Species of bacterium

Tenacibaculum aestuariivivum is a Gram-negative, aerobic, non-spore-forming and non-motile bacterium from the genus of Tenacibaculum which has been isolated from tidal flat sediments from Jindo in Korea. Tenacibaculum aestuariivivum has an optimum growth temperature of 25 °C and produces yellow colonies on marine agar. Cells are catalase and oxidase positive.
