= Metasolibacillus =

Scientific classification
- Domain: Bacteria
- Kingdom: Bacillati
- Phylum: Bacillota
- Class: Bacilli
- Order: Caryophanales
- Family: Caryophanaceae
- Genus: Metasolibacillus; Gupta and Patel. 2020

Type species
- Metasolibacillus meyeri (Seiler et al. 2013) Gupta & Patel 2020

Species
- "M. fluoroglycofeniltyicus"; "M. louembei"; M. meyeri; "M. ndiopicus"

Genus of bacteria

Metasolibacillus is a genus of gram-positive rod-shaped bacteria in the family Caryophanaceae from the order Caryophanales. The type species of this genus is Metasolibacillus meyeri.

Members of Metasolibacillus are previously species belonging to Lysinibacillus and Bacillus. Instead of branching with species from their respective genus, these four species formed a monophyletic branch in various phylogenetic trees constructed based on conserved genome sequences, indicating their phylogenetic relatedness. The family Caryophanaceae encompassed many branching anomalies such as this one, partially due to the reliance on 16S rRNA sequences as a method for classification, which is known to have low resolution power and give differing results depending on the algorithm used. In 2020, a comparative genomic study emended the family, resulting in the establishment of three new genera, including Metasolibacillus.

The name Metasolibacillus is derived from the Greek adjective meta, translating into "besides" and the Latin term Solibacillus, referring the genus name. Together, Metasolibacillus can be translated as a genus besides Solibacillus.

== Biochemical characteristics and molecular signatures ==
Members of this genus are aerobic, motile and endospore-forming. Metasolibacillus can grow in temperatures ranging from 10 °C to 45 °C but the optimal growth temperature is in the range of 30-37 °C. Studied species are reported to be positive for catalase and Voges–Proskauer tests.

12 conserved signature indels (CSIs) were identified as exclusively present in this genus in the following proteins: DUF456 domain-containing protein, toxic anion resistance protein, undecaprenyldiphosphomuramoylpentapeptide beta-N-acetylglucosaminyltransferase, c-type cytochrome biogenesis protein CcsB, thiol-disulfide oxidoreductase ResA, hypothetical proteins, arginase, preprotein translocase subunit SecY, ATP-binding cassette domain-containing protein, and purine permease. These CSIs were identified through genomic analysis and serve as a reliable molecular means for identifying and distinguishing members of this genus from other genera within the family Caryophanaceae and all other bacteria.

== Classification ==
Metasolibacillus, as of 2021, contains one species with a validly published name. This genus was identified as a monophyletic clade and phylogenetically unrelated to other species in the family Caryophanaceae in studies examining the taxonomic relationships within the family.

There are three species that are non-validly published, but are considered to be members of this genus due to shared molecular markers and grouping on phylogenetic trees with the type species.

=== Phylogeny ===
The currently accepted taxonomy is based on the List of Prokaryotic names with Standing in Nomenclature (LPSN) and National Center for Biotechnology Information (NCBI)

16S rRNA based LTP_10_2024

- Metasolibacillus
  - "M. ndiopicus"
  - - "M. louembei" (Ouoba et al. 2015) Gupta & Patel 2019
    - M. meyeri

120 marker proteins based GTDB 09-RS220

- Metasolibacillus
  - M. meyeri (Seiler et al. 2013) Gupta & Patel 2020
  - - "M. fluoroglycofenilyticus" Gupta & Patel 2019
    - "M. ndiopicus" (Lo et al. 2017) Gupta & Patel 2019

== See also ==
- List of bacterial orders
- List of bacteria genera
