= Bhargavaea beijingensis =

Scientific classification
- Domain: Bacteria
- Kingdom: Bacillati
- Phylum: Bacillota
- Class: Bacilli
- Order: Caryophanales
- Family: Caryophanaceae
- Genus: Bhargavaea
- Species: B. beijingensis

Binomial name
- Bhargavaea beijingensis (Qiu et al. 2009) Verma et al. 2012

Type strain
- CGMCC 1.6762, DSM 19037, ge10

Synonyms
- Bacillus beijingensis

Species of bacterium

Bhargavaea beijingensis is a Gram-positive, moderately halotolerant and non-motile bacterium from the genus Bhargavaea which has been isolated from the root of a ginseng plant.
