= Solibacillus isronensis =

Scientific classification
- Domain: Bacteria
- Kingdom: Bacillati
- Phylum: Bacillota
- Class: Bacilli
- Order: Caryophanales
- Family: Caryophanaceae
- Genus: Solibacillus
- Species: S. isronensis

Binomial name
- Solibacillus isronensis (Shivaji et al. 2009) Mual et al. 2016

Type strain
- DSM 21046, JCM 13838, MTCC 7902, strain B3W22

Synonyms
- Bacillus isronensis

Genus of bacteria

Solibacillus isronensis is a bacterium from the genus of Solibacillus which has been isolated from a cryogenic tube from India. It is named after ISRO, India's space agency which discovered the species.
