= Kurthia massiliensis =

Scientific classification
- Domain: Bacteria
- Kingdom: Bacillati
- Phylum: Bacillota
- Class: Bacilli
- Order: Caryophanales
- Family: Caryophanaceae
- Genus: Kurthia
- Species: K. massiliensis

Binomial name
- Kurthia massiliensis Roux et al. 2013

Type strain
- CSUR P141, DSM 24639, JC30

Species of bacterium

Kurthia massiliensis is a gram-positive and aerobic bacterium from the genus Kurthia which has been isolated from human feces from Dielmo in Senegal.
