= Paenisporosarcina indica =

Scientific classification
- Domain: Bacteria
- Kingdom: Bacillati
- Phylum: Bacillota
- Class: Bacilli
- Order: Bacillales
- Family: Caryophanaceae
- Genus: Paenisporosarcina
- Species: P. indica

Binomial name
- Paenisporosarcina indica Reddy et al. 2013

Type strain
- JCM 15114, LMG 23933, strain PN2

Genus of bacteria

Paenisporosarcina indica is a psychrophilic, Gram-positive, aerobic, spore-forming and rod-shaped bacterium from the genus of Paenisporosarcina which has been isolated from soil near the Pindari glacier in the Himalayas.
