= Bhargavaea ullalensis =

Scientific classification
- Domain: Bacteria
- Kingdom: Bacillati
- Phylum: Bacillota
- Class: Bacilli
- Order: Caryophanales
- Family: Caryophanaceae
- Genus: Bhargavaea
- Species: B. ullalensis

Binomial name
- Bhargavaea ullalensis Glaeser et al. 2013

Type strain
- CCM 8429, CIP 110542, LMG 27071, ZMA 19

Species of bacterium

Bhargavaea ullalensis is a Gram-positive, aerobic and non-spore-forming bacterium from the genus Bhargavaea which has been isolated from coastal sand from the coast of Ullal in India.
