= Paenisporosarcina macmurdoensis =

Scientific classification
- Domain: Bacteria
- Kingdom: Bacillati
- Phylum: Bacillota
- Class: Bacilli
- Order: Bacillales
- Family: Caryophanaceae
- Genus: Paenisporosarcina
- Species: P. macmurdoensis

Binomial name
- Paenisporosarcina macmurdoensis (Reddy et al. 2003) Krishnamurthi et al. 2009

Type strain
- CIP 107784, DSM 15428, MTCC 4670, strain CMS 21w

Synonyms
- Sporosarcina macmurdoensis

Genus of bacteria

Paenisporosarcina macmurdoensis is a bacterium from the genus of Paenisporosarcina which has been isolated from cyanobacterial mat from the Mc Murdo dry Valley in the Antarctica.
