= Chryseomicrobium palamuruense =

Scientific classification
- Domain: Bacteria
- Kingdom: Bacillati
- Phylum: Bacillota
- Class: Bacilli
- Order: Caryophanales
- Family: Caryophanaceae
- Genus: Chryseomicrobium
- Species: C. palamuruense

Binomial name
- Chryseomicrobium palamuruense Pindi et al. 2016

Type strain
- CCUG 59101, JCM 16712, KCTC 13722, NBRC 106750, strain PU1

Synonyms
- Bacillus palmuruensis

Species of bacterium

Chryseomicrobium palamuruense is a Gram-positive, rod-shaped, haloalkali-tolerant and motile bacterium from the genus Chryseomicrobium which has been isolated from a drainage near a hostel of the Palamuru University in India.
