= Kurthia populi =

Scientific classification
- Domain: Bacteria
- Kingdom: Bacillati
- Phylum: Bacillota
- Class: Bacilli
- Order: Caryophanales
- Family: Caryophanaceae
- Genus: Kurthia
- Species: K. populi

Binomial name
- Kurthia populi Fang et al. 2015

Type strain
- CFCC 11600, KCTC 33522, 06C10-3-14, 10y-14

Species of bacterium

Kurthia populi is a bacterium from the genus of Kurthia.
