= Sporosarcina soli =

Scientific classification
- Domain: Bacteria
- Kingdom: Bacillati
- Phylum: Bacillota
- Class: Bacilli
- Order: Caryophanales
- Family: Caryophanaceae
- Genus: Sporosarcina
- Species: S. soli

Binomial name
- Sporosarcina soli Kwon et al. 2007

Type strain
- DSM 16920, JCM 16401, KACC 11300, strain I80

Genus of bacteria

Sporosarcina soli is a Gram-positive, aerobic and spore-forming bacterium from the genus of Sporosarcina which has been isolated from soil from Suwon in Korea.
