= Solibacillus kalamii =

Scientific classification
- Domain: Bacteria
- Kingdom: Bacillati
- Phylum: Bacillota
- Class: Bacilli
- Order: Caryophanales
- Family: Caryophanaceae
- Genus: Solibacillus
- Species: S. kalamii

Binomial name
- Solibacillus kalamii Checinska et al. 2017<

Type strain
- DSM 101595, NRRL B-65388, ISSFR-015

Genus of bacteria

Solibacillus kalamii is a Gram-positive, rod-shaped, endospore-forming and aerobic bacterium from the genus of Solibacillus which has been isolated from a high-efficiency particulate arrestance filter system from the International Space Station.

The bacteria is named after the late President of India, Dr. A.P.J. Abdul Kalam, who was a renowned Indian aerospace scientist.

== Discovery ==
The bacteria was found in the high-efficiency particulate arrestance filter or HEPA filter, which is the routine housekeeping and cleaning system on board the International Space Station. The filter on which the new bug was found remained on board the ISS for 40 months. This filter was later analysed at the Jet Propulsion Laboratory (JPL), the foremost lab of NASA for work on interplanetary travel, in 2017. The discovery was published by Dr. Kasthuri Venkateswaran, senior research scientist, Biotechnology and Planetary Protection Group, in the International Journal of Systematic and Evolutionary Microbiology.

== Characteristics ==
They tend to withstand high radiation and also produce some useful compounds protein-wise which will be helpful for biotechnology applications. Researchers have not characterised the bacteria fully but they are of the view that the new bug could be a key source for chemicals that can help protect against radiation damage.
