= Metaplanococcus =

Scientific classification
- Domain: Bacteria
- Kingdom: Bacillati
- Phylum: Bacillota
- Class: Bacilli
- Order: Caryophanales
- Family: Caryophanaceae
- Genus: Metaplanococcus; Gupta and Patel 2020

Type species
- Metaplanococcus flavidus (Jung et al. 2009) Gupta & Patel 2020

Species
- M. flavidus

Genus of bacteria

Metaplanococcus is a genus of gram-positive or gram-variable, cocci or short rod-shaped bacteria in the family Caryophanaceae from the order Caryophanales. The type species of this genus is Metaplanococcus flavidus.

Members of Metaplanococcus are previously species belonging to Planococcus. Instead of branching with species from Planococcus, this species and an unnamed Planomicrobium species formed a monophyletic branch in various phylogenetic trees constructed based on conserved genome sequences, indicating their phylogenetic relatedness. The family Caryophanaceae encompassed many branching anomalies such as this one, partially due to the reliance on 16S rRNA sequences as a method for classification, which is known to have low resolution power and give differing results depending on the algorithm used. In 2020, a comparative genomic study emended the family, resulting in the establishment of three new genera, including Metaplanococcus.

The name Metaplanococcus is derived from the Greek adjective meta, translating into "besides" and the Latin term Planococcus, referring the genus name. Together, Metaplanococcus can be translated as a genus besides Planococcus.

== Biochemical characteristics and molecular signatures ==
Members of this genus motile by means of a single polar flagellum.

17 conserved signature indels (CSIs) were identified through genomic analyses as uniquely present in this genus in the following proteins: ABC transporter substrate-binding protein, methionine–tRNA ligase, MetQ/NlpA family ABC transporter substrate-binding protein, ABC transporter permease, spore protease YyaC, N-acetyl-alpha-D-glucosaminyl-5′L-malate synthase BshA, orotidine-5-phosphate decarboxylase, and phospho-N-acetylmuramoyl-pentapeptide-transferase. These CSIs provide a reliable molecular means for distinguishing members of Metaplanococcus from other genera in the family Caryophanaceae and all other bacteria.

== Taxonomy ==
Metaplanococcus, as of 2021, contains one species with a validly published name. This genus was identified as a monophyletic clade and phylogenetically unrelated to other species in the family Caryophanaceae in studies examining the taxonomic relationships within the family.

== See also ==
- List of bacterial orders
- List of bacteria genera
