= Tenacibaculum holothuriorum =

Scientific classification
- Domain: Bacteria
- Kingdom: Pseudomonadati
- Phylum: Bacteroidota
- Class: Flavobacteriia
- Order: Flavobacteriales
- Family: Flavobacteriaceae
- Genus: Tenacibaculum
- Species: T. holothuriorum

Binomial name
- Tenacibaculum holothuriorum Wang et al. 2015

Type strain
- BCCM/LMG:27758, LMG 27758, MCCC 1A09872

Species of bacterium

Tenacibaculum holothuriorum is a Gram-negative and aerobic bacterium from the genus of Tenacibaculum which has been isolated from the sea cucumber Apostichopus japonicus from Xiapu in China. T. holothuriorum demonstrates gliding motility. Colonies on marine agar are yellow and circular.
