= Chryseomicrobium aureum =

Scientific classification
- Domain: Bacteria
- Kingdom: Bacillati
- Phylum: Bacillota
- Class: Bacilli
- Order: Caryophanales
- Family: Caryophanaceae
- Genus: Chryseomicrobium
- Species: C. aureum

Binomial name
- Chryseomicrobium aureum Deng et al. 2014

Type strain
- CCTCC AB2013082, BUT-2, KACC 17219

Species of bacterium

Chryseomicrobium aureum is a Gram-positive, rod-shaped, aerobic non-spore-forming and non-motile bacterium from the genus Chryseomicrobium which has been isolated from activated sludge from a herbicide-manufacturing wastewater treatment plant in Kunshan in China.
