= Chryseomicrobium imtechense =

Scientific classification
- Domain: Bacteria
- Kingdom: Bacillati
- Phylum: Bacillota
- Class: Bacilli
- Order: Caryophanales
- Family: Caryophanaceae
- Genus: Chryseomicrobium
- Species: C. imtechense

Binomial name
- Chryseomicrobium imtechense Arora et al. 2011

Type strain
- JCM 16573, MTCC 10098, MW 10

Species of bacterium

Chryseomicrobium imtechense is a Gram-positive, rod-shaped, strictly aerobic, non-spore-forming and non-motile bacterium from the genus Chryseomicrobium which has been isolated from seawater from Bengal in India.
