= Sporosarcina siberiensis =

Scientific classification
- Domain: Bacteria
- Kingdom: Bacillati
- Phylum: Bacillota
- Class: Bacilli
- Order: Caryophanales
- Family: Caryophanaceae
- Genus: Sporosarcina
- Species: S. siberiensis

Binomial name
- Sporosarcina siberiensis Zhang et al. 2014

Type strain
- CGMCC 1.12516, LMG 27494, strain 1111S-42

Synonyms
- Sporosarcina arctic

Genus of bacteria

Sporosarcina siberiensis is a Gram-positive, rod-shaped and non-motile bacterium from the genus of Sporosarcina which has been isolated from the East Siberian Sea.
