= Paenisporosarcina quisquiliarum =

Scientific classification
- Domain: Bacteria
- Kingdom: Bacillati
- Phylum: Bacillota
- Class: Bacilli
- Order: Bacillales
- Family: Caryophanaceae
- Genus: Paenisporosarcina
- Species: P. quisquiliarum

Binomial name
- Paenisporosarcina quisquiliarum Krishnamurthi et al. 2009

Type strain
- JCM 14041, MTCC 7604, strain SK 55

Genus of bacteria

Paenisporosarcina quisquiliarum is a bacterium from the genus of Paenisporosarcina.
