= Kurthia =

Scientific classification
- Domain: Bacteria
- Kingdom: Bacillati
- Phylum: Bacillota
- Class: Bacilli
- Order: Caryophanales
- Family: Caryophanaceae
- Genus: Kurthia; Trevisan 1885

Type species
- Kurthia zopfii (Kurth 1883) Trevisan 1885

Species
- See text

Synonyms
- "Bacterium" ("Kurthia") Kurth 1883; "Zopfius" Wenner & Rettger 1919

Genus of bacteria

Kurthia is a bacterial genus from the family Caryophanaceae. Kurthia is a gram-positive, non-spore forming, rod-like bacteria. This strain has been isolated from diarrhea samples, however, no evidence has been brought forward suggesting it is pathogenic in nature. It has also been found in various meats, milks, and soils.

Kurthia species produce carbamoylase and hydantoinase. They also can produce L-Proline from glutamic acid or aspartic acid with the aid of a detergent.

== Phylogeny ==
The currently accepted taxonomy is based on the List of Prokaryotic names with Standing in Nomenclature (LPSN) and National Center for Biotechnology Information (NCBI)

16S rRNA based LTP_10_2024

- Kurthia
  - K. sibirica
  - - - K. gibsonii
      - K. zopfii
    - - K. massiliensis
      - - K. populi Fang et al. 2015
        - - K. huakuii
          - K. senegalensis

120 marker proteins based GTDB 09-RS220

- Kurthia
  - - K. gibsonii Shaw & Keddie 1983
    - - K. sibirica Belikova, Cherevach & Kalakoutskii 1988
      - K. zopfii (Kurth 1883) Trevisan 1885
  - - K. senegalensis Roux et al. 2016
    - - K. massiliensis Roux et al. 2013
      - - K. huakuii Ruan et al. 2014
        - "Ca. K. intestinigallinarum" Gilroy et al. 2021

Unassigned species:

- "K. catenaforma" Kato et al. 1968
- "Ca. K. equi" Gilroy et al. 2022
- "K. ruminicola" Kim et al. 2018
