= Kurthia senegalensis =

Scientific classification
- Domain: Bacteria
- Kingdom: Bacillati
- Phylum: Bacillota
- Class: Bacilli
- Order: Caryophanales
- Family: Caryophanaceae
- Genus: Kurthia
- Species: K. senegalensis

Binomial name
- Kurthia senegalensis Roux et al. 2016

Type strain
- CSUR P138, DSM 24641, strain JC8E

Species of bacterium

Kurthia senegalensis is an aerobic bacterium from the genus Kurthia which has been isolated from human feces from Dielmo in Senegal.
