= Planomicrobium alkanoclasticum =

Scientific classification
- Domain: Bacteria
- Kingdom: Bacillati
- Phylum: Bacillota
- Class: Bacilli
- Order: Bacillales
- Family: Caryophanaceae
- Genus: Planomicrobium
- Species: P. alkanoclasticum

Binomial name
- Planomicrobium alkanoclasticum (Engelhardt et al. 2001) Dai et al. 2005

Type strain
- CIP 107718, NCIMB 13489, strain MAE2

Synonyms
- Planococcus alkanoclasticus

Genus of bacteria

Planomicrobium alkanoclasticum is a Gram-positive, aerobic and chemoorganotrophic bacterium from the genus of Planomicrobium.
