= Tenacibaculum =

Tenacibaculum soleae

Scientific classification
- Domain: Bacteria
- Kingdom: Pseudomonadati
- Phylum: Bacteroidota
- Class: Flavobacteriia
- Order: Flavobacteriales
- Family: Flavobacteriaceae
- Genus: Tenacibaculum; Suzuki et al. 2001

Type species
- Tenacibaculum maritimum

Species
- T. adriaticum T. aestuarii T. aestuariivivum T. agarivorans T. aiptasiae T. amylolyticum T. ascidiaceicola T. caenipelagi T. crassostreae T. dicentrarchi T. discolor T. gallaicum T. geojense T. haliotis T. holothuriorum T. insulae T. jejuense T. litopenaei T. litoreum T. lutimaris T. maritimum T. mesophilum T. ovolyticum T. sediminilitoris T. skagerrakense T. soleae T. todarodis T. xiamenense

Synonyms
- Haerentibaculum

Genus of bacteria

Tenacibaculum is a gram-negative and motile bacterial genus from the family of Flavobacteriaceae.

Many opportunistic pathogens for fish species are included in the genus Tenacibaculum including Tenacibaculum maritimum, Tenacibaculum soleae, Tenacibaculum discolor, Tenacibaculum gallaicum, and Tenacibaculum dicentrarchi. These pathogens cause an ulcerative disease known as tenacibaculosis. Characteristics of tenacibaculosis include lesions on the body, necrosis, frayed fin, tail rot, eroded mouth, and sometimes necrosis on the gills and eyes. The disease can lead to mortality and can leave afflicted species susceptible to secondary infections from the open lesions. Tenacibaculosis is also known as salt water columnaris disease, gliding bacterial disease of sea fish, bacterial stomatitis, eroded mouth syndrome, and black patch necrosis.

It is thought, though not proven, that medusas and salmon louse help spread the bacteria.

== Etiology ==
Diagnosis of the disease is conducted through cultivation and biochemical characterization. T. maritimum is also detectable internally through real-time RT-PCR. The bacterium targets teeth, which is high in the calcium needed to promote their growth. T. maritimum can also be isolated from the kidney, suggesting it is systematic.

== Affected species ==
Many fish species around the world are affected by tenacibaculosis caused by T. maritimum. Species in Japan that are affected by tenacibaculosis include the blackhead seabream (Acanthopagrus schlegelii), red seabream (Pagrus major), Japanese flounder (Paralichthys olivaceous), Yellowtail Seriola quinqueradiata, and Rock bream (Oplegnathus fasciatus). In Europe, affected species include Dover sole (Solea solea), Turbot (Scophthalmus maximus), Atlantic salmon Salmo salar, Gilthead seabream (Sparus aurata) in Spain, and sea bass (Dicentrarchus labrax) in France. In North America, white sea bass (Atractoscion nobilis), Pacific sardine (Sardinops sagax), northern anchovy (Engraulis mordax), and Chinook salmon (Oncorhynchus tschawytscha) were found to be afflicted by T. maritimum. In Australia, rainbow trout (Oncorhynchus mykiss), striped trumpeter (Latris lineata), greenback flounder (Rhombosolea tapirina), yellow-eye mullet (Aldrichetta forsteri), and black bream (Acanthopagrus butcheri) were also afflicted.

T. solea caused tenacibaculosis in fish species sole Solea senegalensis Kaup, brill (Scophthalmus rhombus), and wedge sole (Dicologoglossa cuneata).

T. discolor was found isolated from fish species D. labrax in Italy.

T. dicentrarchi was discovered on the Chilean red conger eel (Genypterus chilensis).

Tenacibaculum has also been the cause of mortalitity in shellfish species as well. Tenacibaculum soleae has been seen to cause mortality in adult Pacific oysters 11 days post-infection.
