= Chryseomicrobium amylolyticum =

Scientific classification
- Domain: Bacteria
- Kingdom: Bacillati
- Phylum: Bacillota
- Class: Bacilli
- Order: Caryophanales
- Family: Caryophanaceae
- Genus: Chryseomicrobium
- Species: C. amylolyticum

Binomial name
- Chryseomicrobium amylolyticum Raj et al. 2013

Type strain
- DSM 23442, JC16, NBRC 105215

Synonyms
- Shivajiella amylolytica

Species of bacterium

Chryseomicrobium amylolyticum is a Gram-positive, rod-shaped and non-motile bacterium from the genus Chryseomicrobium which has been isolated from semi-arid tropical soil from India.
