= Tenacibaculum lutimaris =

Scientific classification
- Domain: Bacteria
- Kingdom: Pseudomonadati
- Phylum: Bacteroidota
- Class: Flavobacteriia
- Order: Flavobacteriales
- Family: Flavobacteriaceae
- Genus: Tenacibaculum
- Species: T. lutimaris

Binomial name
- Tenacibaculum lutimaris Yoon et al., 2005

Species of bacterium

Tenacibaculum lutimaris is a bacterium. It was first isolated from the Yellow Sea, Korea. It is Gram-negative, rod-shaped and its type strain is TF-26^{T} (=KCTC 12302^{T} =DSM 16505^{T}).
