= Tenacibaculum insulae =

Scientific classification
- Domain: Bacteria
- Kingdom: Pseudomonadati
- Phylum: Bacteroidota
- Class: Flavobacteriia
- Order: Flavobacteriales
- Family: Flavobacteriaceae
- Genus: Tenacibaculum
- Species: T. insulae

Binomial name
- Tenacibaculum insulae Park et al. 2018

Type strain
- KCTC 52749, NBRC 112783

Species of bacterium

Tenacibaculum insulae is a Gram-negative, aerobic, non-spore-forming and non-motile bacterium from the genus of Tenacibaculum which has been isolated from tidal flat sediments from Jindo in South Korea.
