= Sporosarcina limicola =

Scientific classification
- Domain: Bacteria
- Kingdom: Bacillati
- Phylum: Bacillota
- Class: Bacilli
- Order: Caryophanales
- Family: Caryophanaceae
- Species: S. limicola

Binomial name
- Sporosarcina limicola Gupta and Patel 2020

Type strain
- 1SS101, ATCC 43646, DSM 12288, DSM 13886, ISS101, NCIB 11923, NCIMB 11923

Synonyms
- Filibacter limicola (Maiden and Jones 1985)

Species of bacterium

Sporosarcina limicola is a Gram-negative bacterium from the genus of Sporosarcina which has been isolated from lake sediment from the English Lake District in Blelham Tarn in England.
