= Tenacibaculum litopenaei =

Scientific classification
- Domain: Bacteria
- Kingdom: Pseudomonadati
- Phylum: Bacteroidota
- Class: Flavobacteriia
- Order: Flavobacteriales
- Family: Flavobacteriaceae
- Genus: Tenacibaculum
- Species: T. litopenaei

Binomial name
- Tenacibaculum litopenaei Sheu et al. 2007

Type strain
- B-I, BCRC 17590, CCRC 17590, LMG 23706

Species of bacterium

Tenacibaculum litopenaei is a Gram-negative, aerobic and rod-shaped bacterium from the genus of Tenacibaculum which has been isolated from shrimp (Litopenaeus vannamei) farmed in a mariculture pond from southern Taiwan. The species can be cultured on chitin salt agar and marine agar.
