= Tenacibaculum agarivorans =

Scientific classification
- Domain: Bacteria
- Kingdom: Pseudomonadati
- Phylum: Bacteroidota
- Class: Flavobacteriia
- Order: Flavobacteriales
- Family: Flavobacteriaceae
- Genus: Tenacibaculum
- Species: T. agarivorans

Binomial name
- Tenacibaculum agarivorans Xu et al. 2017

Type strain
- KCTC 52476, MCCC 1H00174

Species of bacteria

Tenacibaculum agarivorans is a Gram-negative, aerobic, rod-shaped agar-digesting bacterium from the genus of Tenacibaculum which has been isolated from the alga (Porphyra yezoensis) from the coast of Weihai in China.
