= Tenacibaculum ovolyticum =

Scientific classification
- Domain: Bacteria
- Kingdom: Pseudomonadati
- Phylum: Bacteroidota
- Class: Flavobacteriia
- Order: Flavobacteriales
- Family: Flavobacteriaceae
- Genus: Tenacibaculum
- Species: T. ovolyticum

Binomial name
- Tenacibaculum ovolyticum Hansen et al., 1992

Synonyms
- Flexibacter ovolyticus

Species of bacterium

Tenacibaculum ovolyticum is a species of marine, gram-negative bacteria. The species is best known as an opportunistic pathogen of Atlantic halibut (Hippoglossus hippoglossus) eggs and larvae, where it can contribute to egg mortality be degrading the egg envelope.

== Taxonomy ==
The species was originally described as Flexibacter ovolyticus after its isolation from halibut eggs in Norway. It was later transferred to the genus Tenacibaculum following phylogenic studies demonstrating that it was only distantly related to the type species of Flexibacter and instead formed a distinct lineage with several marine flavobacteria, including Tenacibaculum maritimum.

== Phenotypic characteristics ==
=== Morphology ===
Tenacibaculum ovolyticum is a gram-negative, rod-shaped bacterium. Cells are typically 2-20 μm long and approximately 0.5 μm wide. The bacterium demonstrates gliding motility, a characteristic shared with several other members of the genus Tenacibaculum. This species tolerates pH between 5.9 and 9.0.

=== Growth characteristics ===
T. ovolyticum is adapted to cold marine environments and grows at temperatures between approximately 4 and 25 °C. Growth is dependent on seawater and does not occur in media supplemented with sodium chloride alone, distinguishing it from many related species that tolerate a wider range of salinities.

T. ovolyticum produces both catalase and oxidase. The species does not reduce nitrate under normal laboratory conditions.

== Aquaculture relevance ==
Tenacibaculum ovolyticum has been isolated from several species of fish including Atlantic halibut, sardine (Sardina pilchardus) eggs, and American lobster (Homarus americanus).

=== Disease in halibut hatcheries ===
Tenacibaculum ovolyticum was originally identified during investigations of disease outbreaks affecting Atlantic halibut eggs and larvae in marine hatcheries. Experimental studies demonstrated that the bacterium could colonize egg surfaces and contribute to mortality during embryonic development and early larval stages.

== Ecology ==
Tenacibaculum ovolyticum is a marine bacterium that has been recovered from fish eggs and other seawater-associated environments. The species is adapted to cold marine conditions and requires seawater-derived ions for growth. Its ability to degrade biological polymers such as casein, DNA, and chitin suggests a role in the turnover of organic material in marine ecosystems.
