= Tenacibaculum aestuarii =

Scientific classification
- Domain: Bacteria
- Kingdom: Pseudomonadati
- Phylum: Bacteroidota
- Class: Flavobacteriia
- Order: Flavobacteriales
- Family: Flavobacteriaceae
- Genus: Tenacibaculum
- Species: T. aestuarii

Binomial name
- Tenacibaculum aestuarii Jung et al. 2006

Type strain
- JCM 13491, KCTC 12569

Species of bacterium

Tenacibaculum aestuarii is a Gram-negative and rod-shaped bacterium from the genus of Tenacibaculum which has been isolated from tidal flat sediments from Korea. Unlike many members of its genus, T. aesyuarii is able to grow in laboratory media without seawater. The species requires sodium chloride for growth; however, growth is inhibited in sodium chloride concentrations above 7%.
