= Tenacibaculum haliotis =

Scientific classification
- Domain: Bacteria
- Kingdom: Pseudomonadati
- Phylum: Bacteroidota
- Class: Flavobacteriia
- Order: Flavobacteriales
- Family: Flavobacteriaceae
- Genus: Tenacibaculum
- Species: T. haliotis

Binomial name
- Tenacibaculum haliotis Kim et al. 2017

Type strain
- KCTC 52419, NBRC 112382

Species of bacterium

Tenacibaculum haliotis is a bacterium from the genus of Tenacibaculum which has been isolated from the gut of an abalone (Haliotis discus hannai) from the sea near Jeju Island in Korea. The optimum growth temperature is 20 °C. The species is oxidase positive and weakly catalase positive.
