= Tenacibaculum discolor =

Scientific classification
- Domain: Bacteria
- Kingdom: Pseudomonadati
- Phylum: Bacteroidota
- Class: Flavobacteriia
- Order: Flavobacteriales
- Family: Flavobacteriaceae
- Genus: Tenacibaculum
- Species: T. discolor

Binomial name
- Tenacibaculum discolor Piñeiro-Vidal et al. 2008

Type strain
- DSM 18842, LL04 11.1.1, NCIMB 14278

Species of bacterium

Tenacibaculum discolor is a Gram-negative and rod-shaped bacterium from the genus of Tenacibaculum which has been isolated from the kidney of a sole Solea senegalensis from Galicia in Spain. Colonies are yellow, flat and produce uneven edges. T. discolor has an optimum growth temperature of 25 -30 °C. The species requires seawater for growth and is unable to grow in media supplemented with sodium chloride alone. T. discolor is able to hydrolyze casein and gelatin.
