= Tenacibaculum crassostreae =

Scientific classification
- Domain: Bacteria
- Kingdom: Pseudomonadati
- Phylum: Bacteroidota
- Class: Flavobacteriia
- Order: Flavobacteriales
- Family: Flavobacteriaceae
- Genus: Tenacibaculum
- Species: T. crassostreae

Binomial name
- Tenacibaculum crassostreae Lee et al. 2009

Type strain
- JCM 15428, KCTC 22329

Species of bacterium

Tenacibaculum crassostreae is a species of gram-negative bacterium from the genus of Tenacibaculum. The species was first isolated from a Pacific oyster (Crassostrea gigas) from the Wan Island in Korea.
