= Schinkia azotoformans =

Scientific classification
- Domain: Bacteria
- Kingdom: Bacillati
- Phylum: Bacillota
- Class: Bacilli
- Order: Caryophanales
- Family: Bacillaceae
- Genus: Bacillus
- Species: B. azotoformans

Binomial name
- Bacillus azotoformans Pichinoty et al. 1983

Species of bacterium

Bacillus azotoformans is a species of bacteria within the genus Bacillus. Novel nitrite reductases have been isolated from strains of this species.

This species has been recently transferred into the genus Schinkia. The correct nomenclature is Schinkia azotoformans.
