= Tenacibaculum dicentrarchi =

Scientific classification
- Domain: Bacteria
- Kingdom: Pseudomonadati
- Phylum: Bacteroidota
- Class: Flavobacteriia
- Order: Flavobacteriales
- Family: Flavobacteriaceae
- Genus: Tenacibaculum
- Species: T. dicentrarchi

Binomial name
- Tenacibaculum dicentrarchi Piñeiro-Vidal et al. 2012

Type strain
- 35/09, CECT 7612, NCIMB 14598

Species of bacterium

Tenacibaculum dicentrarchi is a Gram-negative and rod-shaped bacterium from the genus of Tenacibaculum which has been isolated from diseased European sea bass from Spain. The species requires media supplemented with seawater for growth, with 70% seawater being the optimum concentration. This salt requirement is specific to seawater, as the bacterium is unable to grow in media supplemented with sodium chloride alone. Similar to many other members of the genus, T. dicentrarchi produces catalase and oxidase.
