= Tenacibaculum ascidiaceicola =

Scientific classification
- Domain: Bacteria
- Kingdom: Pseudomonadati
- Phylum: Bacteroidota
- Class: Flavobacteriia
- Order: Flavobacteriales
- Family: Flavobacteriaceae
- Genus: Tenacibaculum
- Species: T. ascidiaceicola

Binomial name
- Tenacibaculum ascidiaceicola Kim et al. 2016

Type strain
- KCTC 42702, NBRC 111225

Species of bacterium

Tenacibaculum ascidiaceicola is a Gram-negative and non-spore-forming bacterium from the genus of Tenacibaculum which has been isolated from the sea squirt Halocynthia aurantium.
