= Tenacibaculum geojense =

Scientific classification
- Domain: Bacteria
- Kingdom: Pseudomonadati
- Phylum: Bacteroidota
- Class: Flavobacteriia
- Order: Flavobacteriales
- Family: Flavobacteriaceae
- Genus: Tenacibaculum
- Species: T. geojense

Binomial name
- Tenacibaculum geojense Kang et al. 2012

Type strain
- CCUG 60527, KCTC 23423

Species of bacterium

Tenacibaculum geojense is a Gram-negative and non-spore-forming bacterium from the genus of Tenacibaculum which has been isolated from seawater from Korea. T. geojense is motile through gliding motility. The species produces catalase but not oxidase.
