= Bhargavaea =

Scientific classification
- Domain: Bacteria
- Kingdom: Bacillati
- Phylum: Bacillota
- Class: Bacilli
- Order: Caryophanales
- Family: Caryophanaceae
- Genus: Bhargavaea; Manorama et al. 2009

Type species
- Bhargavaea cecembensis Manorama et al. 2009

Species
- Bhargavaea beijingensis; Bhargavaea cecembensis; "Bhargavaea changchunensis"; Bhargavaea ginsengi; "Bhargavaea indica"; Bhargavaea massiliensis; Bhargavaea ullalensis

Genus of bacteria

Bhargavaea is a bacteria genus from the family Caryophanaceae.

== Phylogeny ==
The currently accepted taxonomy is based on the List of Prokaryotic names with Standing in Nomenclature (LPSN) and National Center for Biotechnology Information (NCBI)

16S rRNA based LTP_10_2024

- Bhargavaea
  - B. ginsengi (Qiu et al. 2009) Verma et al. 2012
  - - B. ullalensis Glaeser et al. 2013
    - - B. beijingensis (Qiu et al. 2009) Verma et al. 2012
      - - B. cecembensis Manorama et al. 2009
        - B. massiliensis Olowo-Okere et al. 2023

120 marker proteins based GTDB 09-RS220

- Bhargavaea
  - B. ginsengi
  - - B. cecembensis
    - - B. beijingensis
      - B. massiliensis
