= Planomicrobium koreense =

Scientific classification
- Domain: Bacteria
- Kingdom: Bacillati
- Phylum: Bacillota
- Class: Bacilli
- Order: Bacillales
- Family: Caryophanaceae
- Genus: Planomicrobium
- Species: P. koreense

Binomial name
- Planomicrobium koreense Yoon et al. 2001

Species of bacterium

Planomicrobium koreense is a bacterium, the type species of its genus. It was first isolated from jeotgal, a Korean dish, hence its name. Its type strain is JG07T.
