= Tenacibaculum adriaticum =

Scientific classification
- Domain: Bacteria
- Kingdom: Pseudomonadati
- Phylum: Bacteroidota
- Class: Flavobacteriia
- Order: Flavobacteriales
- Family: Flavobacteriaceae
- Genus: Tenacibaculum
- Species: T. adriaticum

Binomial name
- Tenacibaculum adriaticum Hendl et al., 2008

Species of bacterium

Tenacibaculum adriaticum is a species of gram-negative bacterium. Cells are rod-shaped. Colonies are translucent and yellow-pigmented. Its type strain is B390^{T} (=DSM 18961^{T} =JCM 14633^{T}). This species is able to hydrolyse aesculin. The optimum growth temperature is between 18 - 26 °C.
