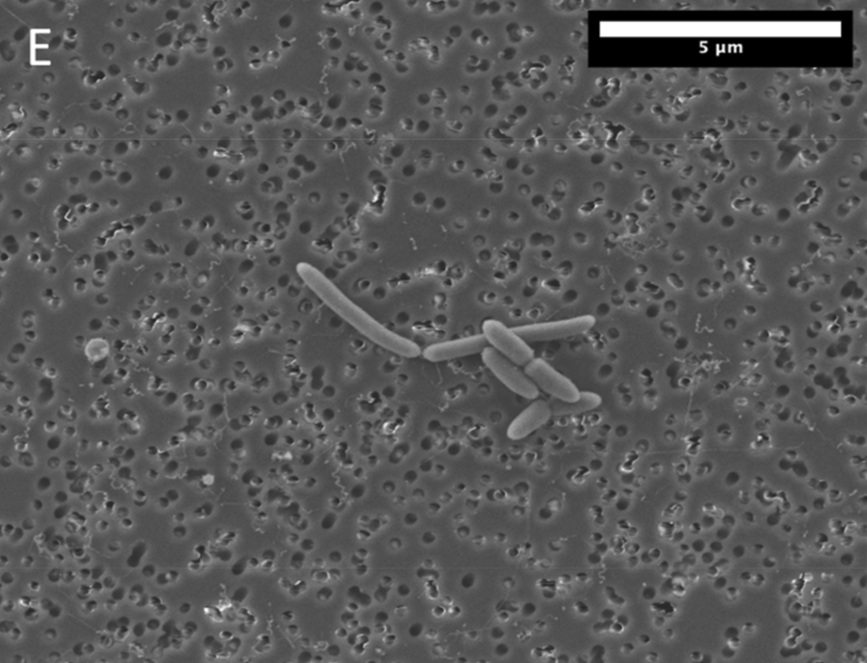
- Sporosarcina highlanderae

Scientific classification
- Domain: Bacteria
- Kingdom: Bacillati
- Phylum: Bacillota
- Class: Bacilli
- Order: Caryophanales
- Family: Caryophanaceae
- Genus: Sporosarcina; Kluyver and van Niel 1936 em. Yoon et al. 2001

Type species
- Sporosarcina ureae (Beijerinck 1901) Kluyver & van Niel 1936

Species
- See text

Synonyms
- Filibacter Maiden & Jones 1985; Sarcina ("Sporosarcina") (Orla-Jensen 1909) Breed 1948; "Urobacillus" Miquel 1889

= Sporosarcina =

Genus of bacteria

Sporosarcina is a genus of bacteria.

== Specification ==
The cells of the species of Sporosarcina are either rod-shaped or coccoid. Sporosarcina forms endospores. The majority species of Sporosarcina is moveable (motile).

== Metabolism ==
All species of Sporosarcina are heterotrophic. They do not perform photosynthesis. A few species are obligate aerobic, they need oxygen. Others are facultative aerobic, they can also perform metabolism in the absence of oxygen.

== Ecology ==
Some species, such as S. ureae have the enzyme urease and are thus able to break down urea. The species forms the highest population densities in soils that are subject to influence of urine. These include, for example, meadows where cattle are kept. Thus S. ureae plays an important role in the ecosystem.

== Molecular Signatures ==
Analyses of genome sequences of Sporosarcina species identified eight conserved signature indels (CSIs) that are uniquely present in this genus in the proteins aspartate–tRNA ligase, A/G-specific adenine glycosylase, thymidylate synthase, RDD family protein, DEAD/DEAH box helicase, membrane protein insertase YidC, cytochrome b6, and a hypothetical protein. These molecular signatures provide a novel and reliable method to molecularly distinguishing Sporosarcina species from other genera in the family Caryophanaceae and other bacteria.

== Phylogeny ==
The currently accepted taxonomy is based on the List of Prokaryotic names with Standing in Nomenclature (LPSN) and National Center for Biotechnology Information (NCBI)

16S rRNA based LTP_10_2024

- Sporosarcina
  - S. contaminans Kämpfer et al. 2010
  - - - S. koreensis Kwon et al. 2007
      - - - S. luteola Tominaga et al. 2009
          - - "S. highlanderae" Simpson et al. 2023
            - S. thermotolerans Kämpfer et al. 2010
        - - S. saromensis An et al. 2007
          - - S. aquimarina Yoon et al. 2001
            - - S. newyorkensis Wolfgang et al. 2012
              - S. ureae (Beijerinck 1901) Kluyver and van Niel 1936
    - - - S. limicola (Maiden & Jones 1985) Gupta & Patel 2020
        - - Filibacter tadaridae Kämpfer et al. 2019
          - - S. globispora (Larkin and Stokes 1967) Yoon et al. 2001
            - S. psychrophila (Nakamura 1984) Yoon et al. 2001
      - - S. soli Kwon et al. 2007
        - - S. siberiensis Zhang et al. 2014
          - - Savagea faecisuis Whitehead et al. 2015
            - - S. jiandibaonis Kong et al. 2022
              - - S. pasteurii (Miquel 1889) Yoon et al. 2001
                - S. terrae Sun et al. 2017

120 marker proteins based GTDB 09-RS220

- Sporosarcina
  - - S. newyorkensis
    - S. ureae
  - - - S. gallistercoris Pallen 2024
      - S. koreensis
    - - - "S. cyprini" Bharti et al. 2022
        - - S. quadrami Pallen 2024
          - - S. luteola
            - S. thermotolerans
      - - - S. jiandibaonis
          - - S. pasteurii
            - "S. ureilytica" Gupta & Patel 2019
        - - "Arthrobacter beigongshangensis"
          - - S. psychrophila
            - - S. limicola
              - Filibacter tadaridae

Unassigned species:

- "S. ginsengisoli" Achal et al. 2012
- "S. jeotgali" Yang et al. 2024
- "S. oncorhynchi" Yang et al. 2024
- "S. sphaerica" Gupta & Patel 2019
- "S. trichiuri" Yang et al. 2024

== See also ==
- List of bacterial orders
- List of bacteria genera
