= Paenisporosarcina =

Scientific classification
- Domain: Bacteria
- Kingdom: Bacillati
- Phylum: Bacillota
- Class: Bacilli
- Order: Caryophanales
- Family: Caryophanaceae
- Genus: Paenisporosarcina; Krishnamurthi et al. 2009

Type species
- Paenisporosarcina quisquiliarum Krishnamurthi et al. 2009

Species
- P. antarctica; P. cavernae; P. indica; P. macmurdoensis; P. quisquiliarum

Genus of bacteria

Paenisporosarcina is a bacteria genus from the family of Planococcaceae.

== Phylogeny ==
The currently accepted taxonomy is based on the List of Prokaryotic names with Standing in Nomenclature (LPSN) and National Center for Biotechnology Information (NCBI)

16S rRNA based LTP_10_2024

- Paenisporosarcina
  - P. cavernae Zhu et al.
  - - - P. indica Reddy et al. 2013
      - P. macmurdoensis (Reddy et al. 2003) Krishnamurthi et al. 2009
    - - P. antarctica (Yu et al. 2008) Reddy et al. 2013
      - P. quisquiliarum Krishnamurthi et al. 2009

120 marker proteins based GTDB 09-RS220

- Paenisporosarcina
  - P. cavernae
  - - P. indica
    - - P. antarctica
      - P. quisquiliarum

== See also ==
- List of bacterial orders
- List of bacteria genera
