= Tenacibaculum caenipelagi =

Scientific classification
- Domain: Bacteria
- Kingdom: Pseudomonadati
- Phylum: Bacteroidota
- Class: Flavobacteriia
- Order: Flavobacteriales
- Family: Flavobacteriaceae
- Genus: Tenacibaculum
- Species: T. caenipelagi

Binomial name
- Tenacibaculum caenipelagi Park and Yoon 2014

Type strain
- CECT 8283, HJ-26M, KCTC 32323

Species of bacterium

Tenacibaculum caenipelagi is a Gram-negative, aerobic, non-spore-forming and rod-shaped bacterium from the genus of Tenacibaculum which has been isolated from tidal flat sediments from Korea.
