= Chryseomicrobium deserti =

Scientific classification
- Domain: Bacteria
- Kingdom: Bacillati
- Phylum: Bacillota
- Class: Bacilli
- Order: Caryophanales
- Family: Caryophanaceae
- Genus: Chryseomicrobium
- Species: C. deserti

Binomial name
- Chryseomicrobium deserti Lin et al. 2017

Type strain
- CCTCC AB 2016179, KACC 18929, THG-T1.18

Species of bacterium

Chryseomicrobium deserti is a Gram-positive, rod-shaped, aerobic, and non-motile bacterium from the genus Chryseomicrobium which has been isolated from desert soil from Korea.
