= Planomicrobium chinense =

Scientific classification
- Domain: Bacteria
- Kingdom: Bacillati
- Phylum: Bacillota
- Class: Bacilli
- Order: Bacillales
- Family: Caryophanaceae
- Genus: Planomicrobium
- Species: P. chinense

Binomial name
- Planomicrobium chinense Dai et al. 2005

Type strain
- AS 1.3454, JCM 12466, strain DX3-12

Synonyms
- Planomicrobium novatatis

Genus of bacteria

Planomicrobium chinense is a Gram-positive, aerobic and motile bacterium from the genus of Planomicrobium which has been isolated from sediments from the coast of the Eastern China Sea in China.
