= Sporosarcina ureae =

Scientific classification
- Domain: Bacteria
- Kingdom: Bacillati
- Phylum: Bacillota
- Class: Bacilli
- Order: Caryophanales
- Family: Caryophanaceae
- Genus: Sporosarcina
- Species: S. ureae

Binomial name
- Sporosarcina ureae (Beijerinck 1901) Kluyver and van Niel 1936

Species of bacterium

Sporosarcina ureae is a type of bacteria of the genus Sporosarcina, and is closely related to the genus Bacillus. S. ureae is an aerobic, motile, spore-forming, Gram-positive coccus, originally isolated in the early 20th century from soil. S. ureae is distinguished by its ability to grow in relatively high concentrations of urea through production of at least one exourease, an enzyme that converts urea to ammonia. S. ureae has also been found to sporulate when environmental conditions become unfavorable, and can remain viable for up to a year .

== History ==
In the early 20th century, famous Dutch microbiologist Martinus Beijerinck isolated a microorganism that he named Planosarcina ureae. In an effort to isolate bacteria from urea-containing soil enrichments, he repeatedly came across a motile coccus that clustered in packets and had the ability to form endospores. The isolated organism's nomenclature changed often as the result of the morphological and biochemical observations done by early researchers. In 1911, Lohnis proposed that the organism should be called Sarcina ureae because of the cluster packets the organism formed in culture. In the 1960s, researchers MacDonald and MacDonald along with Kocur and Martinec moved Sarcina ureae to the genus Sporosarcina (proposed by Orla-Jensen in 1909 and first used by Kluyver and van Neil in 1936). Later in 1973, Pregerson isolated over 50 different strains of S. ureae from numerous soil samples around the world, finding that the organism is most commonly present in soils that reflected high activities of dogs and humans.

== Characteristics ==
The cells are coccoid. Cells are 1–2.5 μm. Cell division is carried out in two or three successive planes, such that tetrads or packets of eight or more cells are formed. S. ureae forms endospores (like all species of the genus). The endospores are 0.5–1.5 μm. The species can move using a flagellum.

== Metabolism ==
S. ureae is heterotrophic, as it does not perform photosynthesis. Its metabolism is due to cellular respiration. The species is strictly aerobic, as it needs oxygen. The optimal pH for growth is 7. The optimal temperature for growth is 25 °C. Growth under oxygen exclusion does not occur. The oxidase test is positive.

== Ecology ==
S. ureae is one of the bacteria that can make use of urea with the enzyme urease. It is often found in soil, and forms the highest population densities in soils exposed to large amounts of urine, for example, cow pastures. Through plating serial dilutions of soil, both Gibson and Pregerson found that a gram of soil could contain up to 10,000 S. ureae organisms. S. ureae probably plays an important role in the degradation of urine. It is also found in manure and tolerates a pH of 9–10.

== Isolation ==
Over the years, several methods have been developed to isolate and maintain cultures of S. ureae. In 1935, Gibson used standard nutrient agar supplemented with 3-5% urea to inhibit most other soil organisms that would otherwise outcompete S. ureae. Pregerson's (1973) isolation technique was similar, but she used tryptic soy yeast agar (27.5 g Difco tryptic soy broth, 5.0 g Difco yeast extract, 15.0 g Difco agar, 1 liter of water) supplemented with 1% urea and incubated serial dilutions of soil samples at a cooler 22 °C. Omitting the urea provides an effective maintenance medium.

== Etymology ==
The genus name derives from the Greek word spora ("spore") and the Latin word sarcina ("package", "bundle") and refers to the fact that it forms endospores and the typical arrangement of the cells. The species name derives from the ability of this species to break down urea.

== Genetics and phylogeny ==
Currently, only a draft genome of S. ureae exists. Automated annotation server RAST (rast.nmpdr.org) reveals specific genes involved in stress response, cell wall and capsule, and household genes, among others. Claus et al. (1983) determined the GC content of S.ureae to be 40.6-40.8%. S. ureae is closely related to other spore-forming organisms of the genus Bacillus, an observation first noted by Beijerinck in 1903. Fox et al. (1977) showed that S. ureae is most closely related to B. pasteurii.

== Biotechnological applications ==
Recently interest in S. ureae has increased due to the potential biotechnological applications; however, research has nearly been exclusively focused on the unique outer cell surface layer (S-layer). S-layers are composed of single proteins that form a predictable lattice structure and have potential applications in nanoelectronics, medicine, and biosensors. An example of this research is the S-layer's promising role in enzyme immobilization. The process of artificially breaking down certain metabolites and poisons is often slowed by the proximity of the required enzymes needed to one another. However, if one were able to use the S. ureae S-layer, all the required enzymes needed to metabolize a specific poison could be bound together, thus dramatically increasing rate of the reactions. Furthermore, much of the research is looking into the self-assembly property of S-layers which, when bound to certain antibodies, has the ability to advance the vaccine development. Studies are also looking its role in certain pathogens, such as B. anthracis, where it is implicated in cellular attachment.

Other important areas of this research can be seen in some of the current work being done at the Ames Research Center (NASA), looking at organisms that convert urea to ammonium. A presentation by Lynn Rothschild (Horizon Lectures, Sept. 2012) indicated some of the first colonizers of Mars might use these organisms to convert human waste to ammonium and subsequently use the ammonium to lower the pH of the Mars soils to make calcium carbonate cement. This cement could then be used to make bricks and other building materials.

The ability for S.ureae to convert urea to ammonia has important potential applications in the production of biofuels and fertilizers. Ammonia is currently being actively researched as a carbon-alternative fuel source. The high octane rating (110-130) and its relative safety when compared to gasoline make it an ideal replacement for current gasoline. Traditional methods of generating ammonia for fertilizer rely heavily on the use of natural gas; in fact, to produce the ammonia needed for current fertilizer demands accounts for an estimated 2% of the entire world's energy consumption.
