= Tenacibaculum skagerrakense =

Scientific classification
- Domain: Bacteria
- Kingdom: Pseudomonadati
- Phylum: Bacteroidota
- Class: Flavobacteriia
- Order: Flavobacteriales
- Family: Flavobacteriaceae
- Genus: Tenacibaculum
- Species: T. skagerrakense

Binomial name
- Tenacibaculum skagerrakense Frette et al., 2004

Species of bacterium

Tenacibaculum skagerrakense is a bacterium. It is named after Skagerrak, Denmark, where it was first isolated. Its type strain is D30^{T} (=ATCC BAA-458^{T} =DSM 14836^{T}).

== Description ==
T. skagerrakense is Gram-negative, oxidase- and catalase-positive. Cells are rods (0.5–15 micrometres in length) during exponential growth; spherical cells occur in stationary phase. Colonies are bright yellow and flexirubin-type pigment is absent.
