= Tenacibaculum mesophilum =

Scientific classification
- Domain: Bacteria
- Kingdom: Pseudomonadati
- Phylum: Bacteroidota
- Class: Flavobacteriia
- Order: Flavobacteriales
- Family: Flavobacteriaceae
- Genus: Tenacibaculum
- Species: T. mesophilum

Binomial name
- Tenacibaculum mesophilum Suzuki, Nakagawa, Harayama & Yamamoto, 2001

Species of bacterium

Tenacibaculum mesophilum is a bacterium. T. mesophilum was first isolated from sponge and green algae which were collected on the coast of Japan and Palau. Its type strain is MBIC 1140^{T} (= IFO 16307^{T}).
