= Tenacibaculum litoreum =

Scientific classification
- Domain: Bacteria
- Kingdom: Pseudomonadati
- Phylum: Bacteroidota
- Class: Flavobacteriia
- Order: Flavobacteriales
- Family: Flavobacteriaceae
- Genus: Tenacibaculum
- Species: T. litoreum

Binomial name
- Tenacibaculum litoreum Choi et al. 2006

Type strain
- JCM 13039, KCCM 42115

Species of bacterium

Tenacibaculum litoreum is a species of gram-negative bacterium from the genus of Tenacibaculum which has been isolated from tidal flat sediments from Ganghwa in Korea.
