= Tenacibaculum soleae =

Scientific classification
- Domain: Bacteria
- Kingdom: Pseudomonadati
- Phylum: Bacteroidota
- Class: Flavobacteriia
- Order: Flavobacteriales
- Family: Flavobacteriaceae
- Genus: Tenacibaculum
- Species: T. soleae

Binomial name
- Tenacibaculum soleae Piñeiro-Vidal et al., 2008

Species of bacterium

Tenacibaculum soleae is a species of bacterium from the order Flavobacteriales. T. soleae is a fish pathogen for some species of sole, brill and turbot, with a particularly high mortality rate. This species is Gram-negative, rod-shaped and demonstrates gliding motility. Its type strain is LL04 12.1.7^{T} (=CECT 7292^{T} =NCIMB 14368^{T}).
