= Chryseomicrobium =

Scientific classification
- Domain: Bacteria
- Kingdom: Bacillati
- Phylum: Bacillota
- Class: Bacilli
- Order: Caryophanales
- Family: Caryophanaceae
- Genus: Chryseomicrobium; Arora et al. 2011

Type species
- Chryseomicrobium imtechense Arora et al. 2011

Species
- Chryseomicrobium amylolyticum; Chryseomicrobium aureum; Chryseomicrobium deserti; Chryseomicrobium excrementi; Chryseomicrobium imtechense; Chryseomicrobium palamuruense

Synonyms
- "Tetzosporium" Tetz & Tetz 2018

Genus of bacteria

Chryseomicrobium is a bacteria genus from the family Caryophanaceae.

== Phylogeny ==
The currently accepted taxonomy is based on the List of Prokaryotic names with Standing in Nomenclature (LPSN) and National Center for Biotechnology Information (NCBI)

16S rRNA based LTP_10_2024

- Chryseomicrobium
  - C. palamuruense Pindi, Ashwitha & Rani 2016
  - - - C. aureum Deng et al. 2014
      - C. imtechense Arora et al. 2011
    - - C. excrementi Saha et al. 2018
      - C. amylolyticum Raj et al. 2013

120 marker proteins based GTDB 09-RS220

- Chryseomicrobium
  - C. aureum
  - - C. excrementi
    - Tetzosporium hominis Tetz & Tetz 2018
