= Tenacibaculum todarodis =

Scientific classification
- Domain: Bacteria
- Kingdom: Pseudomonadati
- Phylum: Bacteroidota
- Class: Flavobacteriia
- Order: Flavobacteriales
- Family: Flavobacteriaceae
- Genus: Tenacibaculum
- Species: T. todarodis

Binomial name
- Tenacibaculum todarodis Shin et al. 2018

Type strain
- JCM 31564, KACC 18887

Species of bacterium

Tenacibaculum todarodis is a Gram-negative, aerobic and rod-shaped bacterium from the genus of Tenacibaculum which has been isolated from a squid (Todarodes pacificus) from the Sea of Japan in Korea. The species has an optimum growth temperature of 25 °C.
