= Tenacibaculum maritimum =

Scientific classification
- Domain: Bacteria
- Kingdom: Pseudomonadati
- Phylum: Bacteroidota
- Class: Flavobacteriia
- Order: Flavobacteriales
- Family: Flavobacteriaceae
- Genus: Tenacibaculum
- Species: T. maritimum

Binomial name
- Tenacibaculum maritimum (Hikida et al. 1979) Yoon et al. 2005

Type strain
- CIP 12302, DSM 16505, KCTC 12302, TF-26

Synonyms
- Flexibacter marinus Cytophaga marina

Species of bacterium

Tenacibaculum maritimum is a bacterium from the genus of Tenacibaculum. Tenacibaculum maritimum can cause skin infections in marine fish. The disease caused by Tenacibaculum maritimum is called tenacibaculosis.

The genome of T. maritimum encodes numerous virulence factors, including a type IX secretion system, hemolysins, adhesins, and proteases.
