= Tenacibaculum jejuense =

Scientific classification
- Domain: Bacteria
- Kingdom: Pseudomonadati
- Phylum: Bacteroidota
- Class: Flavobacteriia
- Order: Flavobacteriales
- Family: Flavobacteriaceae
- Genus: Tenacibaculum
- Species: T. jejuense

Binomial name
- Tenacibaculum jejuense Oh et al. 2012

Type strain
- JCM 15975, KCTC 22618

Species of bacterium

Tenacibaculum jejuense is a Gram-negative, strictly aerobic and rod-shaped bacterium from the genus of Tenacibaculum which has been isolated from seawater from the coast of Jeju Island in Korea. The bacterium demonstrates gliding motility.
