= Planomicrobium =

Scientific classification
- Domain: Bacteria
- Kingdom: Bacillati
- Phylum: Bacillota
- Class: Bacilli
- Order: Caryophanales
- Family: Caryophanaceae
- Genus: Planomicrobium

Species
- Planomicrobium alkanoclasticum Planomicrobium chinense Planomicrobium flavidum Planomicrobium glaciei Planomicrobium koreense Planomicrobium mcmeekinii Planomicrobium okeanokoites Planomicrobium psychrophilum Planomicrobium soli Planomicrobium stackebrandtii

Genus of bacteria

Planomicrobium (formerly Planococcus) is a genus of gram-positive bacteria. It includes the hydrocarbon-degrading strain P. alkanoclasticum MAE2.
