= Tenacibaculum sediminilitoris =

Scientific classification
- Domain: Bacteria
- Kingdom: Pseudomonadati
- Phylum: Bacteroidota
- Class: Flavobacteriia
- Order: Flavobacteriales
- Family: Flavobacteriaceae
- Genus: Tenacibaculum
- Species: T. sediminilitoris

Binomial name
- Tenacibaculum sediminilitoris Park et al. 2016

Type strain
- KCTC 52210, NBRC 111991

Species of bacterium

Tenacibaculum sediminilitoris is a Gram-negative and non-spore-forming bacterium from the genus of Tenacibaculum which has been isolated from tidal flat sediments from the Yellow Sea in Korea.
