= Tenacibaculum xiamenense =

Scientific classification
- Domain: Bacteria
- Kingdom: Pseudomonadati
- Phylum: Bacteroidota
- Class: Flavobacteriia
- Order: Flavobacteriales
- Family: Flavobacteriaceae
- Genus: Tenacibaculum
- Species: T. xiamenense

Binomial name
- Tenacibaculum xiamenense Li et al. 2013

Type strain
- CGMCC 1.12378, LMG 27422, WJ-1

Species of bacterium

Tenacibaculum xiamenense is a Gram-negative and aerobic bacterium from the genus of Tenacibaculum which has been isolated from seawater from Xiamen in China.
