= Tenacibaculum aiptasiae =

Scientific classification
- Domain: Bacteria
- Kingdom: Pseudomonadati
- Phylum: Bacteroidota
- Class: Flavobacteriia
- Order: Flavobacteriales
- Family: Flavobacteriaceae
- Genus: Tenacibaculum
- Species: T. aiptasiae

Binomial name
- Tenacibaculum aiptasiae Wang et al. 2008

Type strain
- a4, BCRC 17655, CCRC 17655, LMG 24004

Species of bacterium

Tenacibaculum aiptasiae is a Gram-negative, aerobic and rod-shaped bacterium from the genus of Tenacibaculum which has been isolated from the sea anemone (Aiptasia pulchella).
