= Planomicrobium flavidum =

Scientific classification
- Domain: Bacteria
- Kingdom: Bacillati
- Phylum: Bacillota
- Class: Bacilli
- Order: Caryophanales
- Family: Caryophanaceae
- Genus: Planomicrobium
- Species: P. flavidum

Binomial name
- Planomicrobium flavidum Jung et al. 2009

Type strain
- CCUG 56756, KCTC 13261, strain ISL-41

Genus of bacteria

Planomicrobium flavidum is a bacterium from the genus of Planomicrobium which has been isolated from a marine solar saltern.
