= Solibacillus =

Scientific classification
- Domain: Bacteria
- Kingdom: Bacillati
- Phylum: Bacillota
- Class: Bacilli
- Order: Caryophanales
- Family: Caryophanaceae
- Genus: Solibacillus; Krishnamurthi 2009

Type species
- Solibacillus silvestris (Rheims et al. 1999) Krishnamurthi, Chakrabarti & Stackebrandt 2009

Species
- S. cecembensis; S. daqui; S. faecavium; "S. ferritrahens"; S. isronensis; S. kalamii; "S. merdavium"; S. palustris; S. silvestris

Genus of bacteria

Solibacillus is a genus of Gram positive, rod shaped, spore-forming bacteria.

The first member of Solibacillus was first isolated in 1999, and was originally called Bacillus silvestris. However, further studies on B. silvestris found that the organism belonged in a separate genus. Solibacillus silvestris was proposed, referring to its original designation as a member of Bacillus, and the fact that the species was first isolated from soil. Bacillus isronensis was later reclassified as Solibacillus isronensis. S. isronensis was isolated from cryotubes that were used to collect air samples from high altitudes, and S. kalamii was found in an air filter from the International Space Station.

In 2020, the family Planococcaceae was merged with the family Caryophanaceae due to nomenclature rules under the International Code of Nomenclature of Prokaryotes. In addition, the family Caryophanaceae underwent several taxonomic changes to account for the large number of phylogenetically unrelated species that were misclassified. Using comparative genomic analyses, the study identified several unique molecular markers (specifically conserved signature indels) could serve as a reliable means to distinguish genera such as Solibacillus within the family.

== Molecular Signatures ==
12 conserved signature indels (CSIs) were identified through genomic analyses for this genus in the following proteins: flagellar hook–basal body protein, aminodeoxychorismate lyase, VOC family protein, DNA topoisomerase IV subunit A, DegV family protein, helicase–exonuclease AddAB subunit AddB, multidrug resistance efflux transporter family protein, heme-dependent peroxidase, methionine ABC transporter ATP-binding protein, tRNA 4-thiouridine(8) synthase ThiI, and AAA family ATPase. These CSIs provide a reliable molecular method for distinguishing Solibacillus species from other genera within the family Caryophanaceae and all other bacteria.

== Phylogeny ==
The currently accepted taxonomy is based on the List of Prokaryotic names with Standing in Nomenclature (LPSN) and National Center for Biotechnology Information (NCBI)

16S rRNA based LTP_10_2024

- Solibacillus
  - S. cecembensis (Reddy, Uttam & Shivaji 2008) Gupta & Patel 2020
  - - Caryophanon
    - - S. daqui Liang et al. 2023
      - - S. isronensis (Shivaji et al. 2009) Mual et al. 2016
        - - S. kalamii Checinska Sielaff et al. 2017
          - S. silvestris (Rheims et al. 1999) Krishnamurthi, Chakrabarti & Stackebrandt 2009

120 marker proteins based GTDB 09-RS220

- Solibacillus
  - S. cecembensis
  - - - S. faecavium Pallen 2024
      - "S. merdavium" Gilroy et al. 2021
    - - S. isronensis
      - S. silvestris [incl. S. kalamii]

== See also ==
- List of bacterial orders
- List of bacteria genera
