= Lysinibacillus alkalisoli =

Scientific classification
- Domain: Bacteria
- Kingdom: Bacillati
- Phylum: Bacillota
- Class: Bacilli
- Order: Bacillales
- Family: Caryophanaceae
- Genus: Lysinibacillus
- Species: L. alkalisoli

Binomial name
- Lysinibacillus alkalisoli Sun et al. 2017

Type strain
- Y2A20

Bacterium of genus of Lysinibacillus

Lysinibacillus alkalisoli is a Gram-positive, aerobic and motile bacterium from the genus of Lysinibacillus which has been isolated from saline-alkaline soil from Hanggin Banner.
