= N-carbamoyl-L-amino-acid hydrolase =

Identifiers
- EC no.: 3.5.1.87

Databases
- BRENDA: enzyme data
- ExPASy: NiceZyme view
- KEGG: enzyme entry
- MetaCyc: metabolic pathway
- Rhea: reactions
- PDB structures: RCSB PDB PDBe PDBsum
- Gene Ontology: AmiGO / QuickGO
Search
- PMC: articles
- PubMed: articles
- NCBI: proteins

N-carbamoyl-L-amino-acid hydrolase (EC 3.5.1.87) is an enzyme that catalyzes the general chemical reaction:

N-carbamoyl-L-2-amino acid (a 2-ureido carboxylate) + H_{2}O $\rightleftharpoons$ L-2-amino acid + NH_{3} + CO_{2}

For example, the enzyme characterised from Sinorhizobium meliloti hydrolyses carglumic acid to L-glutamic acid, with ammonia and carbon dioxide as byproducts:

carglumic acid
H_{2}O
NH_{3}
glutamic acid
+ CO_{2}

This reaction is part of biochemical pathway called the hydantoinase process which converts 5-substituted hydantoins into optically pure D- or L-amino acids.

This enzyme is a hydrolase which act on carbon-nitrogen bonds other than peptide bonds, specifically in linear amides. The systematic name of this enzyme class is N-carbamoyl-L-amino acid amidohydrolase.
