= Caryophanon =

Scientific classification
- Domain: Bacteria
- Kingdom: Bacillati
- Phylum: Bacillota
- Class: Bacilli
- Order: Caryophanales
- Family: Caryophanaceae
- Genus: Caryophanon; Peshkoff 1939

Species
- Caryophanon latum; Caryophanon tenue

Genus of bacteria

Caryophanon is a genus of bacteria ine the family of Caryophanaceae. Despite its limited importance, it is also type genus and namesake of the order Caryophanales over the synonym Bacillales based on the genus Bacillus.
