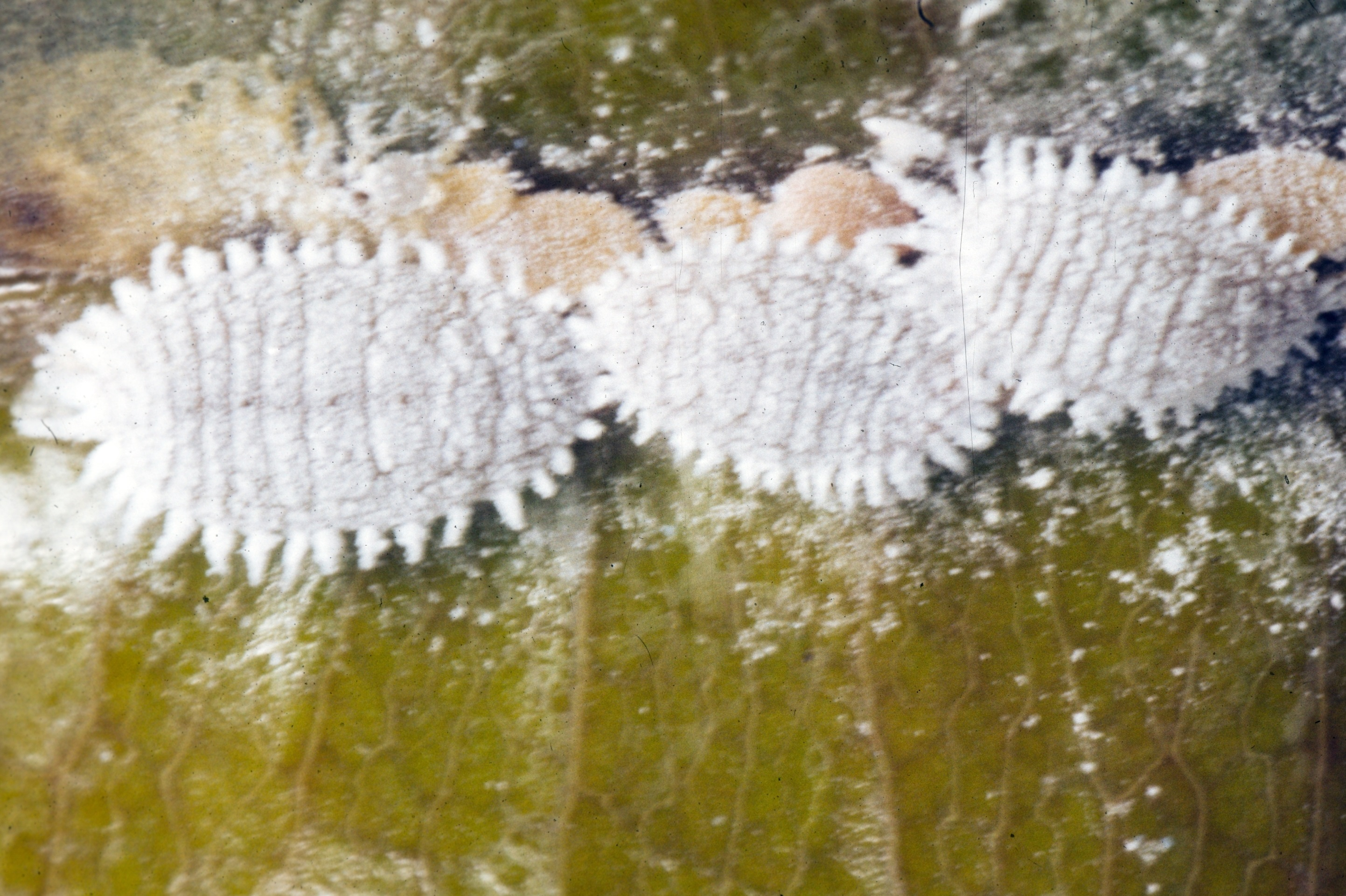
- Lab sample of planococcus citri

Scientific classification
- Domain: Eukaryota
- Kingdom: Animalia
- Phylum: Arthropoda
- Class: Insecta
- Order: Hemiptera
- Suborder: Sternorrhyncha
- Family: Pseudococcidae
- Genus: Planococcus; Ferris, 1950

= Planococcus (bug) =

Genus of bugs

Planococcus is a genus of true bugs belonging to the family Pseudococcidae. The genus has a cosmopolitan distribution. A number of species are invasive agricultural pests.

== Species ==
- Planococcus aemulor
- Planococcus angkorensis
- Planococcus aphelus
- Planococcus bagmaticus
- Planococcus bendovi
- Planococcus boafoensis
- Planococcus cajani
- Planococcus citri
- Planococcus dendrobii
- Planococcus dioscoreae
- Planococcus dischidiae
- Planococcus dubius
- Planococcus epulus
- Planococcus ficus
- Planococcus flagellatus
- Planococcus fungicola
- Planococcus furcisetosus
- Planococcus halli
- Planococcus hosnyi
- Planococcus hospitus
- Planococcus indicus
- Planococcus japonicus
- Planococcus kenyae
- Planococcus kraunhiae
- Planococcus lilacinus
- Planococcus litchi
- Planococcus mali
- Planococcus martini
- Planococcus minor
- Planococcus musae
- Planococcus nigritulus
- Planococcus nilgiricus
- Planococcus orchidi
- Planococcus philippinensis
- Planococcus planococcoides
- Planococcus principe
- Planococcus psidii
- Planococcus radicum
- Planococcus subterraneus
- Planococcus sulawesi
- Planococcus taigae
- Planococcus tanzaniensis
- Planococcus tiomanensis
- Planococcus vovae
- Planococcus zairensis

== Species identification ==
Identification of mealybug species in the Planococcus genus has been difficult due to an unusually high amount of intraspecies morphological variation. In the 1980s, entomologist Jennifer Cox at the British Museum discovered that the offspring of a single female raised on the same host will develop differently based on environmental conditions. She showed that higher temperatures induced smaller specimens overall with fewer pores, shorter appendages, and shorter setae. From Cox's experiments, the greatest number of tubular ducts in adult females was present at intermediate temperatures, whereas the smallest number were present when temperatures were higher or lower. Cox's work showed that the proposed species Planococcus citricus was in fact a warm temperature variant of Planococcus citri. This created issues in the discrimination of species as these characteristics were among those used by Ezzat & McConnell in their treatment of Planococcus species in 1956. In 1989 Cox revised the genus and listed 35 species. She also created a point-based system to distinguish between Planococcus minor and Planococcus citri based on a matrix of six characters, known as the 'Cox score'. However other morphologically similar species, such as Planococcus ficus and Planococcus halli, a single diagnostic characteristic was not identified. With the improvements in genotyping, efforts to develop different systems to distinguish between cryptic species of Planococcus are ongoing.
