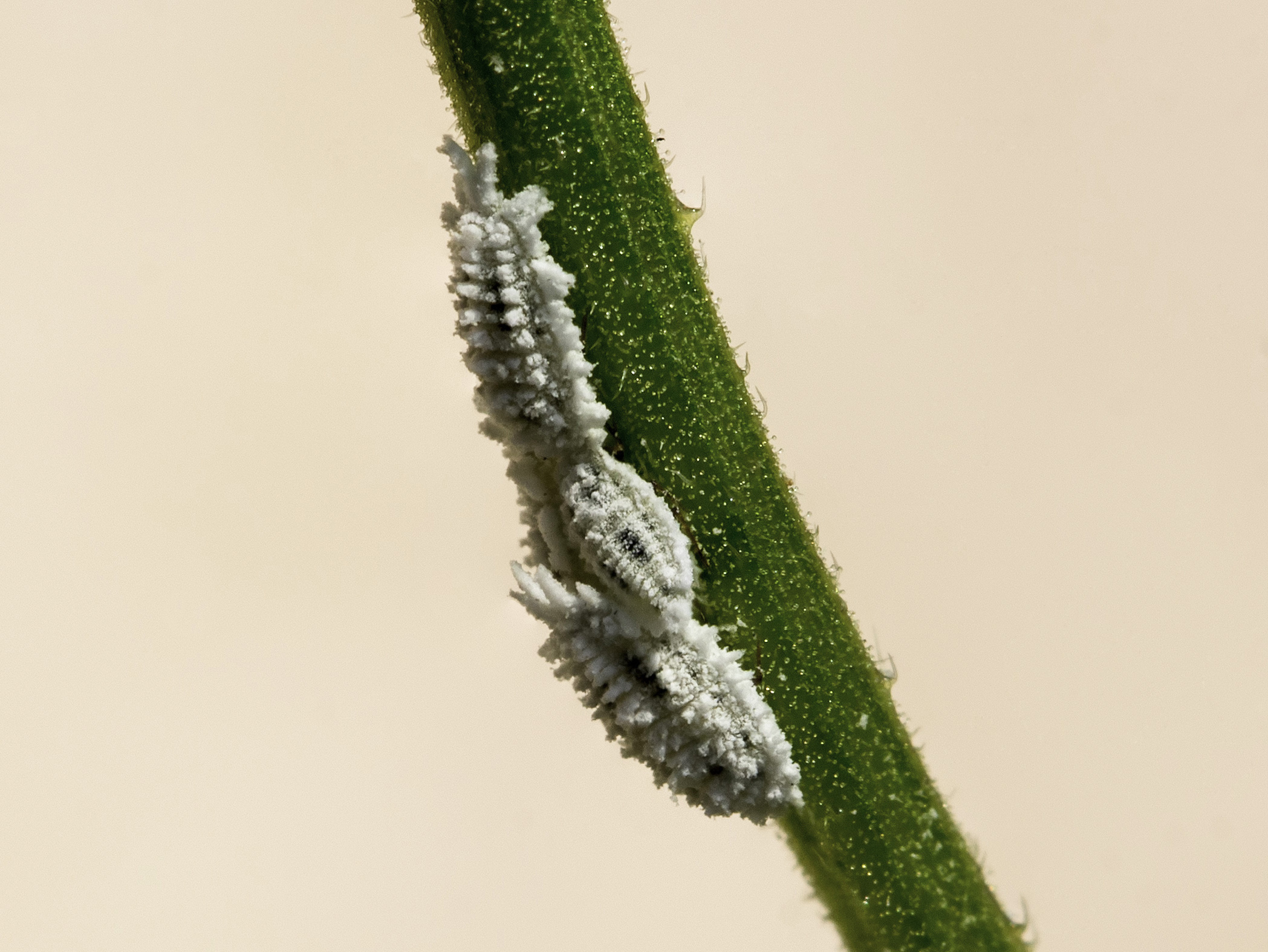
- Planococcus ficus on a stem

Scientific classification
- Kingdom: Animalia
- Phylum: Arthropoda
- Clade: Pancrustacea
- Class: Insecta
- Order: Hemiptera
- Suborder: Sternorrhyncha
- Family: Pseudococcidae
- Genus: Planococcus
- Species: P. ficus

Binomial name
- Planococcus ficus Ben-Dov, 1994

= Planococcus ficus =

Species of mealybug

Planococcus ficus, commonly known as the vine mealybug, is a species of mealybug, belonging to the family Pseudococcidae, native to tropical and subtropical regions. The vine mealybug is found in Europe, Northern Africa, Southern Africa, the Americas, and the Middle East. The vine mealybug is invasive to weedy plants in many different regions of the world.

== Description ==
Planococcus ficus are bilaterally symmetric, triploblastic, coelomic, protostomes

=== Female description ===
Planococcus ficus exhibits sexual dimorphism. Adult females are about 4 mm long, 2 mm wide and 1.5 mm thick. Female P. ficus are wingless and generally larger than males. They have a segmented, humpbacked, pale white or flesh colored body. With a girdle of frilly white projections and a thin dark line of denuded wax running on the dorsal surface, the female bodies are covered in a fine, white, powdery wax secretion.

=== Male description ===
Adult male P. ficus are about 1 mm long and have transparent wings. They have a brown body with beaded antenna and filamentous anal setae for flight stabilization. Adult males do not possess mouth parts and use their anal setae for feeding.

== Taxonomy ==
Planococcus ficus were most recently classified by Ben-Dov in 1994 as being insects of the kingdom Animalia, phylum Arthropoda, class Insecta, order Hemiptera, suborder Homoptera, family Pseudococcidae and superfamily Coccoidea. They belong to the genus Planococcus and species Ficus.

== Ecology ==
Planococcus ficus are herbivores that feed on all parts of the grape vine plant and weedy plants. They are found on apples, avocados, banana, date palm, fig, mango, and citrus fruits. They specifically feed on the phloem sap of their host plants.

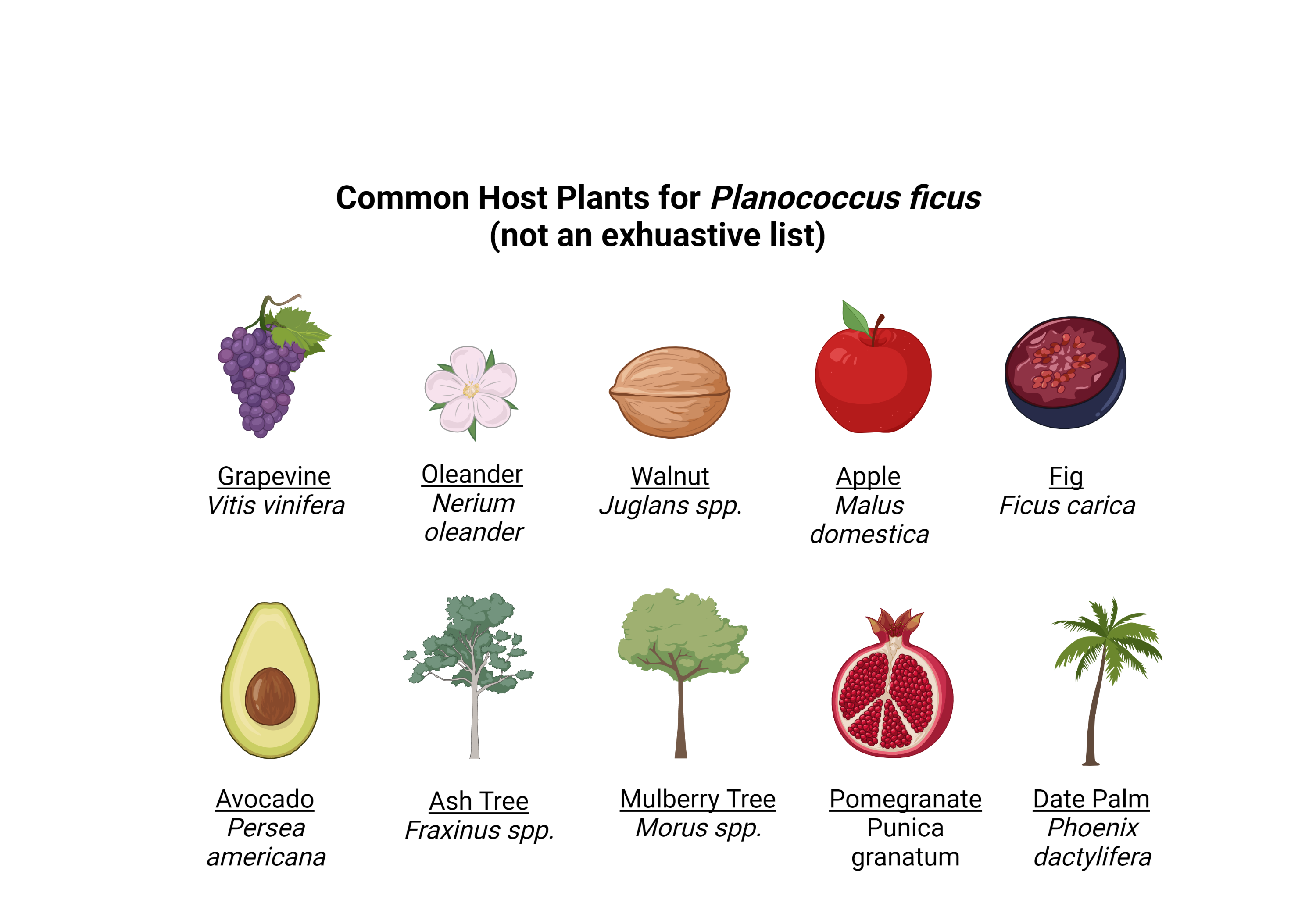
host plants of Planococcus ficus

=== Distribution ===
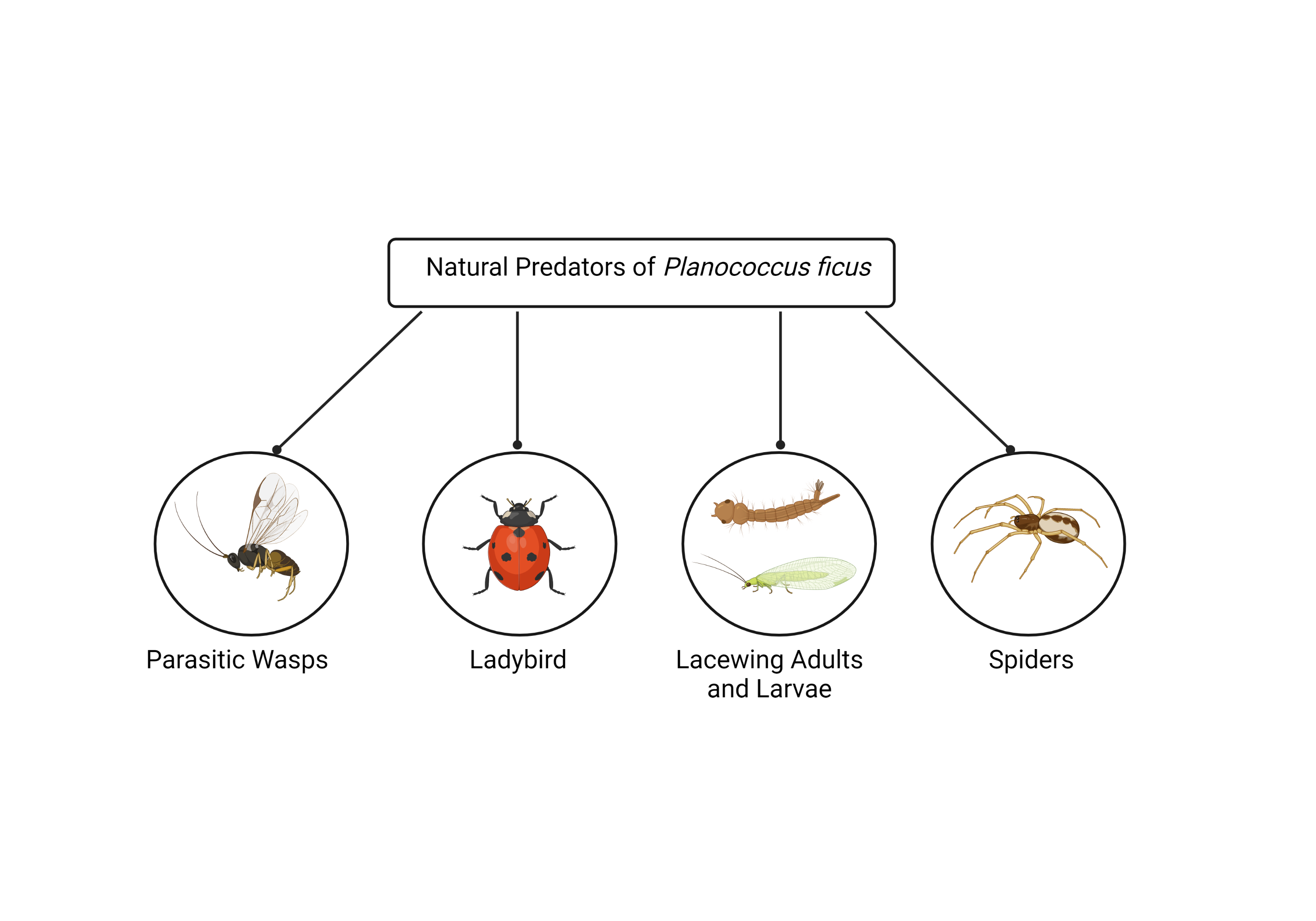
natural predators of Planococcus ficus

Vine mealybugs are found in tropical and subtropical regions of the world such as Europe, Northern Africa, South Africa, Argentina, the Middle East, and Mexico. The vine mealybug has been reported in over 47 countries and is thought to have originated from Israel. Transportation of the vine mealybug has occurred through the movement of infected plants and agricultural equipment. This has allowed the vine mealybug to be invasive to many different regions of the world.

The vine mealybug lives in colonies on host plants and migrates between different parts of the plant depending on seasonal changes. The vine mealybug is usually distributed along the bark of the host plant’s trunk and arms and underground in the roots during the winter seasons. Vine mealybugs then move to the base of the plant’s shoots during the spring and become densely distributed on leaf foliage during summer and fall seasons.

=== Ecological relationships ===
Many P. ficus form mutualistic relationships with neighboring ant colonies. Ant colonies feed on the honeydew produced by the vine mealybug and in the winter, vine mealybugs utilize the underground tunnels that the ants dig. Additionally, ants protect the vine mealybug from natural predators such as predatory beetles.

=== Predators ===
Vine mealybugs have multiple natural predators such as predatory beetles like the Lady bird, parasitoid wasps such as Leptomastidea abnormis and entomopathogenic nematodes Steunernematidae and Heterorhabditidae.

== Morphology ==
Male and Female vine mealybugs reach maturity at about 31.6 days and live for approximately 68 days depending on environmental conditions.

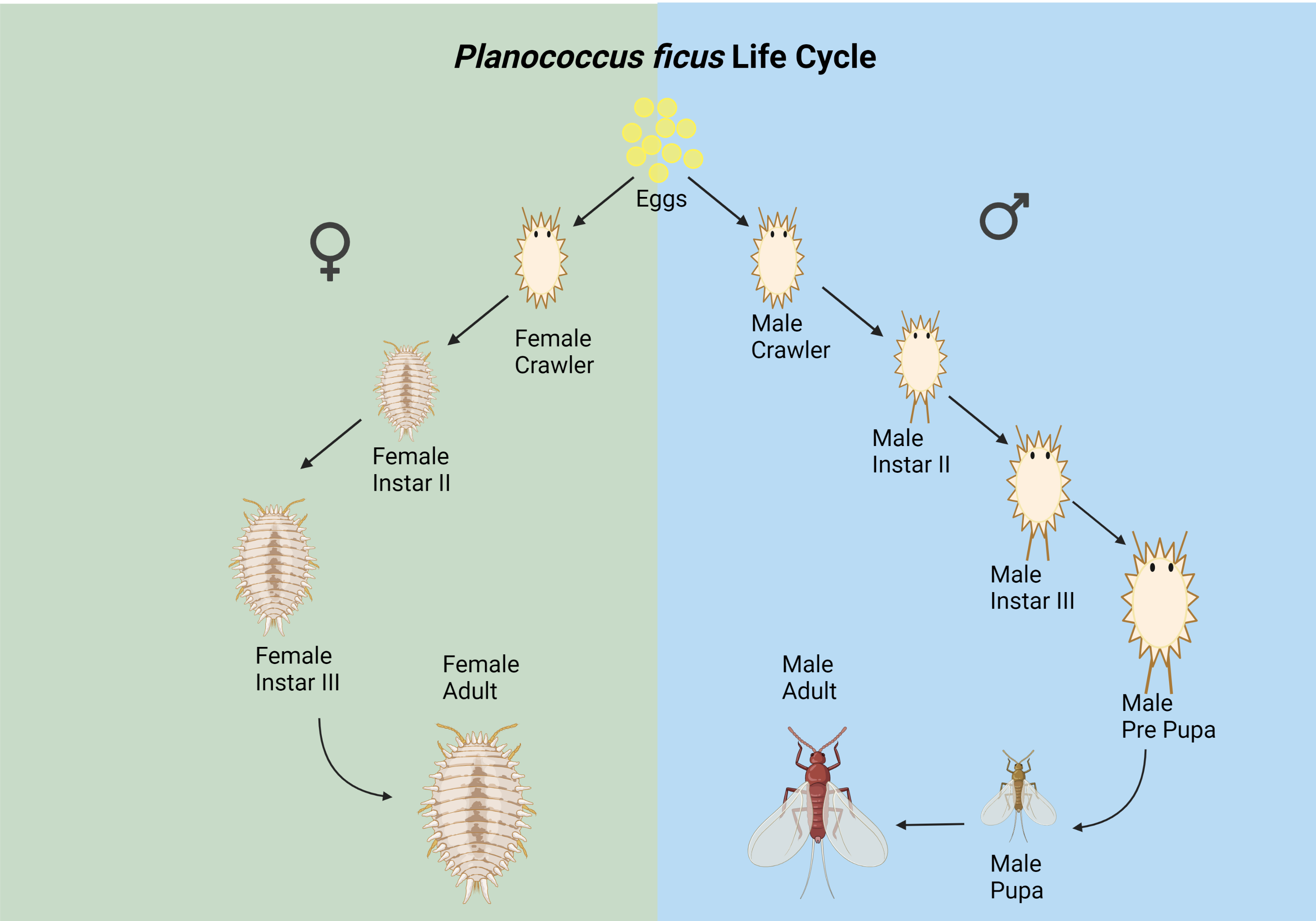
life cycle of male and female Planococcus ficus

=== Male life cycle ===
Male P. ficus go through a holometabolous metamorphosis with seven growth phases. Males start as light yellow or brown eggs. They then enter the first nymphal instar and have a dark yellow coloration and six antennal segments. The male then molts and enters the second nymphal instar. During the second instar the male spins a cocoon, the third nymphal instar, prepupa and pupa stages all occur within the cocoon. During the prepupa stage one pair of lateral ocelli and visible wing buds form. During the pupae stage males develop three pairs of lateral ocelli and the wing buds grow to reach the third abdominal segments. Adult males then emerged from the cocoon with a fully developed set of wings.

=== Female life cycle ===
Female P. ficus are hemimetabolous and have five growth stages. Like male eggs, they are light yellow or brown eggs. They then enter the first nymphal instar and have a dark yellow coloration and six antennal segments. At the second instar females grow larger and turn a yellowish, brown color. The females grow larger again during the third instar and have a more defined waxy layer and eight antennal segments. Adult Females are wingless and coated in a waxy covering. At each molt the female becomes more sessile, grows larger and secretes more wax.

Both male crawlers and adult females have sucking mouthparts to pierce host plants and suck sap.

== Reproduction ==
Planococcus ficus reproduces sexually through internal fertilization. Sessile females release pheromones to attract motile males. Males practice a walking behavior and walk on the female’s back and use their antennae to probe for the female’s genitalia. The female lifts its abdomen to allow for mating.

Females can mate multiple times a day and most males die after mating. Mating occurs year-round but is highest in warmer months. Typically, anywhere from 3- 6 generations are bred per year depending on geographical location and temperatures.

Females lay eggs in an egg sac made of filamentous waxy hairs. These sacs can be placed anywhere on the host plant or underground. P. ficus has little parental investment and hatched young are left to provide for themselves.

== Environmental impacts ==
The vine mealybug has emerged as a large pest in vineyards due to agricultural practices such as nitrogen fertilizer use and irrigation techniques. Vine mealybugs are known to produce large amounts of honey dew that can lead to mold development on foliage and branches. The vine mealybug is also a vector for plant disease like grapevine leaf roll that can cause discoloration and rolling of vine leaves. This can lead to poor fruit production in the grapevine plant. The vine mealybug is also a vector for corky-bark disease and shiraz disease in vines.

=== Management ===
The vine mealybug is often treated with insecticides such as a two-part application of chlorpyrifos or prothiophos. While insecticides have some success, they are often not complete solutions because mealybugs are able to withstand insecticides. The vine mealybug's distribution under the bark and roots of host plants make it hard to exterminate. Additionally, the waxy covering of the vine mealybug make it hydrophobic and able to avoid contact with insecticides.

=== Monitoring ===
Physical sampling of infested vines and pheromone monitoring are often used to assess treatment options. Physical sampling is most effective in summer seasons to estimate the population size to determine if insecticide intervention is needed. Pheromone sampling utilizes pheromone bait traps to attract and capture males. Female population sizes are estimated based on the male population sizes.

=== Biological enemy usage ===
Planococcus ficus infestations are often controlled through biological enemies of the vine mealybug. Surrounding foliage and cover crops are planted to increase natural populations of vine mealybugs natural enemies.

Additionally, proper pruning regimens for host plants are used to increase biological predators’ effectiveness by reducing hunting area.
