= N-carbamoyl-D-amino acid hydrolase =

Identifiers
- EC no.: 3.5.1.77
- CAS no.: 71768-08-6

Databases
- IntEnz: IntEnz view
- BRENDA: BRENDA entry
- ExPASy: NiceZyme view
- KEGG: KEGG entry
- MetaCyc: metabolic pathway
- PRIAM: profile
- PDB structures: RCSB PDB PDBe PDBsum
- Gene Ontology: AmiGO / QuickGO
Search
- PMC: articles
- PubMed: articles
- NCBI: proteins

In enzymology, a N-carbamoyl-D-amino acid hydrolase (EC 3.5.1.77) is an enzyme that catalyzes the chemical reaction

N-carbamoyl-D-amino acid + H_{2}O $\rightleftharpoons$ D-amino acid + NH_{3} + CO_{2}

Thus, the two substrates of this enzyme are N-carbamoyl-D-amino acid and H_{2}O, whereas its 3 products are D-amino acid, NH_{3}, and CO_{2}.

This enzyme belongs to the subfamily of hydrolases which act on carbon-nitrogen bonds other than peptide bonds, specifically in linear amides.

== Structural studies ==
As of late 2007, 7 structures have been solved for this class of enzymes, with PDB accession codes 1ERZ, 1UF4, 1UF5, 1UF7, 1UF8, 2GGK, and 2GGL.
