= Calidifontibacillus erzurumensis =

Alteribacillus alkaliphilus

Scientific classification
- Domain: Bacteria
- Kingdom: Bacillati
- Phylum: Bacillota
- Class: Bacilli
- Order: Bacillales
- Family: Bacillaceae
- Genus: Calidifontibacillus
- Species: C. azotoformans

Binomial name
- Calidifontibacillus azotoformans Adiguzel et al. 2020

Type strain
- P2

Bacterium

Calidifontibacillus azotoformans is a Gram-positive, aerobic endospore-forming, rod-shaped and motile bacterium from the genus of Calidifontibacillus which has been isolated from water of a hot spring.
