= FMN reductase (NADPH) =

Enzyme involved in redox reactions

Identifiers
- EC no.: 1.5.1.38

Databases
- IntEnz: IntEnz view
- BRENDA: BRENDA entry
- ExPASy: NiceZyme view
- KEGG: KEGG entry
- MetaCyc: metabolic pathway
- PRIAM: profile
- PDB structures: RCSB PDB PDBe PDBsum
Search
- PMC: articles
- PubMed: articles
- NCBI: proteins

FMN reductase (NADPH) (EC 1.5.1.38, FRP, flavin reductase P, SsuE) is an enzyme with systematic name FMNH_{2}:NADP^{+} oxidoreductase. This enzyme catalyses the following chemical reaction:

FMNH_{2} + NADP^{+} $\rightleftharpoons$ FMN + NADPH + H^{+}

The enzymes from bioluminescent bacteria contain flavin mononucleotide (FMN).
