= Marine agar =

Microbiological growth medium

Marine agar (also known as ZoBell marine agar, Marine Agar 2216, or marine medium 2216) is a microbiological growth medium designed for the cultivation and isolation of marine bacteria. Marine agar is widely used in marine microbiology, environmental microbiology, aquaculture, and microbial taxonomy research for the recovery and study of heterotrophic marine bacteria.

== History ==
Prior to the 1940s, bacteriologists used several media formulations to cultivate and characterize, often producing inconsistent and non-comparable results. Early studies on marine bacteria found that many species grew poorly on conventional bacteriological media of the day because those media did not adequately reproduce the salinity and mineral composition of seawater.

Claude E. Zobell investigated the nutritional requirements of marine bacteria and evaluated the effects of salinity, pH, mineral composition, nutrient sources, and solidifying agents on bacterial cultivation. ZoBell demonstrated that substantially more bacteria grew on media prepared with natural seawater than on comparable freshwater media. Additionally, marine bacteria recovered from seawater and marine sediments exhibited specific salt requirements that were only partially satisfied by artificial seawater. His work also showed that enrichment with ferric phosphate increased colony recovery and that optimal growth occurred at approximately pH 7.5-7.8.

Based on these studies, ZoBell created medium 2216, which consisted of 0.5%, 0.001% ferric phosphate, and 1.5% agar dissolved in aged seawater, with a final pH of approximately 7.6 after sterilization. Medium 2216 subsequently became one of the most widely used media in marine microbiology and served as the basis for later commercial marine agar formulations.

== Organisms cultivated ==
Marine agar supports the growth of a wide variety of heterotrophic marine bacteria. Early studies using marine media demonstrated successful recovery of several genera including Achromobacter, Actinomyces, Pseudomonas, Sarcina, Serratia, and Vibrio.

== Limitations ==
Although marine agar is considered a standard cultivation medium in marine microbiology, it recovers only a small proportion of microorganisms present in marine environments. This discrepancy is attributed to the "great plate count anomaly," in which direct microscopic observations shows substantially more microorganisms than can be cultivated on laboratory media.

Many marine microorganisms are oligotrophic and adapted to nutrient poor environments. These organisms often grow poorly or fail to grow on nutrient-rich media such as marine agar. Other marine bacteria may depend on symbiotic interactions, signaling compounds, or growth factors that are difficult to recreate in artificial laboratory media.
