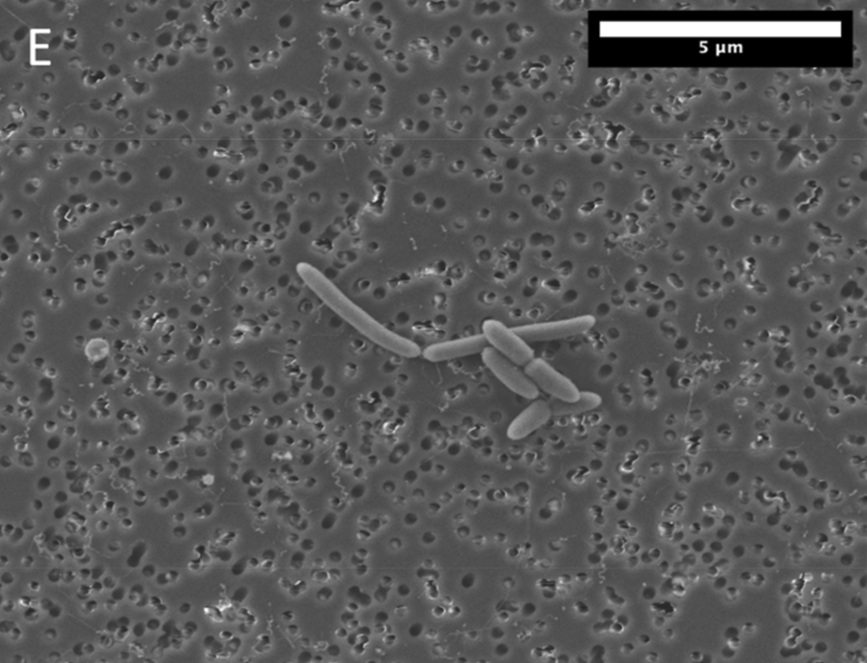
- Sporosarcina highlanderae

Scientific classification
- Domain: Bacteria
- Kingdom: Bacillati
- Phylum: Bacillota
- Class: Bacilli
- Order: Caryophanales
- Family: Caryophanaceae; Peshkoff, 1939

Genera
- Bhargavaea; Caryophanon; Chryseomicrobium; Chungangia; Indiicoccus; Jeotgalibacillus; Kurthia; Lysinibacillus; Metalysinibacillus; Metaplanococcus; Metasolibacillus; Paenisporosarcina; Planococcus; Psychrobacillus; Rummeliibacillus; Savagea; Solibacillus; Sporosarcina; Ureibacillus

Synonyms
- Planococcaceae Krassilnikov 1949; "Sporosarcineae" Kluyver & van Niel 1936; "Zopfieae" Winslow et al. 1920

= Caryophanaceae =

Family of bacteria

The Caryophanaceae is a family of Gram-positive bacteria. In 2020, the now defunct family Planococcaceae was merged into Caryophanaceae to rectify a nomenclature anomaly. The type genus of this family is Caryophanon.

The family Planococcacae was validly published in 1949, however it contained within it another family level taxonomic rank, the family Caryophanaceae, which was validly published in 1939. According to the International Code of Nomenclature of Prokaryotes (ICNP), the name Caryophanacaeae has higher priority than Planococcaceae because of its earlier publication. Therefore, the emended family retained the name Caryophanaceae.

The name Caryophanaceae is derived from the Latin term Caryophanon, referring the type genus of the family and the suffix "-aceae", an ending used to denote a family. Together, Caryophanaceae refers to a family whose nomenclatural type is the genus Caryophanon.

== Biochemical characteristics and molecular signatures ==
Cells from members of the family Caryophanaceae can be cocci or rods, sometimes forming filaments or trichomes. Most species are strictly aerobic heterotrophs, although some are also facultatively aerobes. Cells are generally motile by flagella or gliding and they may or may not form endospores. Most species are catalase-positive and oxidase positive or negative.

Analyses of genome sequences from Caryophanaceae species identified 13 conserved signature indels (CSIs) that are uniquely present in this family in the proteins phenylalanine–tRNA ligase subunit alpha, chaperonin GroEL, ribosome maturation factor RimP, BrxA/BrxB family bacilliredoxin, RNA methyltransferase, Rhomboid family intramembrane serine protease, ATP-dependent Clp protease ATP-binding subunit, DNA-directed RNA polymerase subunit beta, chorismate synthase, stage IV sporulation protein A, peptidase, KinB-signaling pathway activation protein, and DUF423 domain-containing protein. These CSIs serve as a reliable molecular means of demarcating members Caryophanaceae from other families within the order Caryophanales and other bacteria.

== Historical systematics and current taxonomy ==
Caryophanaceae, as of 2021, contains 19 validly published genera.

In addition to the nomenclature anomaly, Caryophanaceae also encompassed over 100 species that had varying morphology/biochemical characteristics, demonstrating that they were phylogenetically unrelated. The original assignment of species into the family Caryophanaceae was largely based on 16S rRNA genome sequence analyses, which is known to have low discriminatory power and the results of which changes depends on the algorithm and organism information used. Despite this, the analyses still exhibited polyphyletic branching, indicating the presence of distinct subgroups within the family.

In 2020, Gupta and Patel proposed the emendation of Caryophanaceae, specifically the unification with Planoccocacae, the proposal of 3 new genera as well as the transfer of a number of misclassified species into the appropriate genera. The changes were proposed based on various phylogenetic trees constructed based on multiple large datasets of protein sequences and the identification of unique molecular markers known as conserved signatures indels in multiple proteins.

== Phylogeny ==
The currently accepted taxonomy is based on the List of Prokaryotic names with Standing in Nomenclature (LPSN) and National Center for Biotechnology Information (NCBI)

16S rRNA based LTP_10_2024

- - Bhargavaea Manorama et al. 2009
  - - - - "Planococcus lenghuensis" Yang et al. 2020
        - Indiicoccus Pal et al. 2019
      - Planococcus
    - - Ureibacillus Fortina et al. 2001
      - - - Chungangia Kim et al. 2012
          - Sporosarcina Orla-Jensen 1909 [incl. Savagea Whitehead et al. 2015]
        - - Chryseomicrobium deserti Lin et al. 2017
          - - Paenisporosarcina Krishnamurthi et al. 2009
            - - - Chryseomicrobium Arora et al. 2011
                - Psychrobacillus Krishnamurthi et al. 2011
              - - - Viridibacillus Albert et al. 2007
                  - - Rummeliibacillus Vaishampayan et al. 2009
                    - Kurthia (Kurth 1883) Trevisan 1885
                - - - Lysinibacillus alkalisoli Sun, Xu & Wu 2017
                    - Metalysinibacillus Gupta & Patel 2020
                  - - - Lysinibacillus odysseyi (La Duc, Satomi & Venkateswaran
                        2004) Jung et al. 2012
                      - - Metasolibacillus Gupta & Patel 2020
                        - Ureibacillus ~1, Ureibacillus ~2, Lysinibacillus ~1
                          & Lysinibacillus ~2
                    - - Bacillus decisifrondis Zhang et al. 2007
                      - Lysinibacillus Ahmed et al. 2007 [incl. Caryophanon
                        Peshkoff 1939 & Solibacillus Krishnamurthi et al. 2009]

120 marker proteins based GTDB 09-RS220

- - - - "Edaphobacillus" Lal et al. 2013
      - Bhargavaea
    - - Savagea
      - Sporosarcina
  - - - Indiicoccus [incl. "Planococcus lenghuensis"]
      - Planococcus Migula 1894 non Ferris 1950
    - - - Paenisporosarcina
        - - Chryseomicrobium
          - Psychrobacillus
      - - - Viridibacillus
          - - Rummeliibacillus
            - Kurthia
        - - Metalysinibacillus [incl. Lysinibacillus alkalisoli]
          - - Lysinibacillus
            - - Caryophanon
              - - - Metasolibacillus
                  - - Lysinibacillus odysseyi
                    - Solibacillus
                - Ureibacillus

Unassigned genera:

- "Crocinobacterium" Lee 2006
- Metaplanococcus Gupta & Patel 2020
- "Stomatostreptococcus" Ping et al. 1998
