= American services and supply in the Siegfried Line campaign =

American supply during WWII

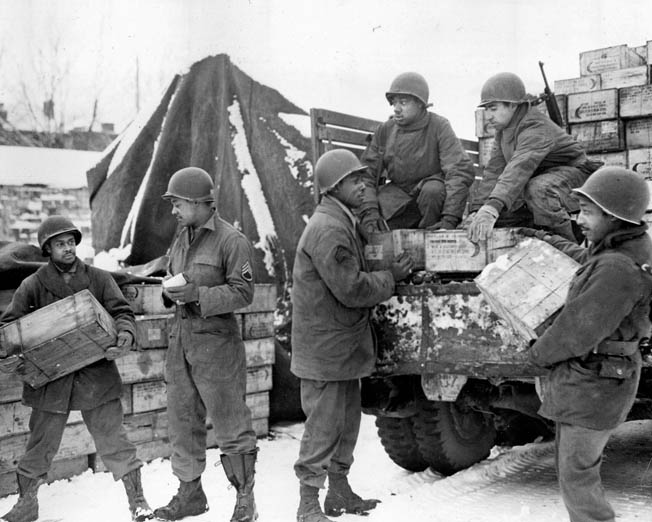
Soldiers of the 4185th Quartermaster Service Company load trucks with rations at Liege in Belgium.

American services and supply played a crucial part in the World War II Siegfried Line campaign, which ran from the end of the pursuit of the German armies from Normandy in mid-September 1944 until December 1944, when the American forces were engulfed by the German Ardennes offensive. In August 1944, the Supreme Allied Commander, General Dwight D. Eisenhower, elected to continue the pursuit of the retreating German forces beyond the Seine and across France and Belgium to the German border instead of pausing to build up supplies and establish the line of communications as called for in the original Operation Overlord plan. The subsequent advance to the German border stretched the American logistical system to breaking point, and the advance came to a halt in mid-September.

Problems with port capacity and transportation created many shortages, but many others were the result of mismanagement and underestimating requirements. A critical shortage of winter clothing developed from a reluctance to accept new items and a failure to order adequate quantities in the mistaken belief that the war would end before they were required. The winter of 1944–1945 in Northwest Europe was unusually cold and wet, and American soldiers were not trained in how to avoid cold injury. The American forces suffered 71,000 casualties from trench foot and frostbite.

Artillery ammunition shortages that developed in the early days of the campaign increased casualties, delayed operations and lengthened the war. The specific causes of the shortage of artillery ammunition in the European Theater of Operations (ETO) in 1944 varied over time: between June and November, there was insufficient discharge capacity over the beaches and through the ports; between August and October, supply lines were overstretched and inadequate to move enough ammunition to the front lines; from November 1944 to April 1945, there was insufficient production of ammunition in the United States.

== Background ==
In the first seven weeks after the Allied invasion of Normandy on D-Day, 6 June 1944, determined German opposition exploited the defensive value of the Normandy bocage country. The Allied advance was slower than the Operation Overlord plan had anticipated. Operation Cobra, which the First Army commenced on 25 July, effected a turnaround in the operational situation by achieving a breakout from the Normandy lodgment area. The 12th Army Group became active on 1 August, under the command of Lieutenant General Omar N. Bradley. It initially consisted of the First Army, commanded by Lieutenant General Courtney Hodges, and the Third Army, under Lieutenant General George S. Patton Jr. The Ninth Army, under Lieutenant General William H. Simpson, joined the 12th Army Group on 5 September.

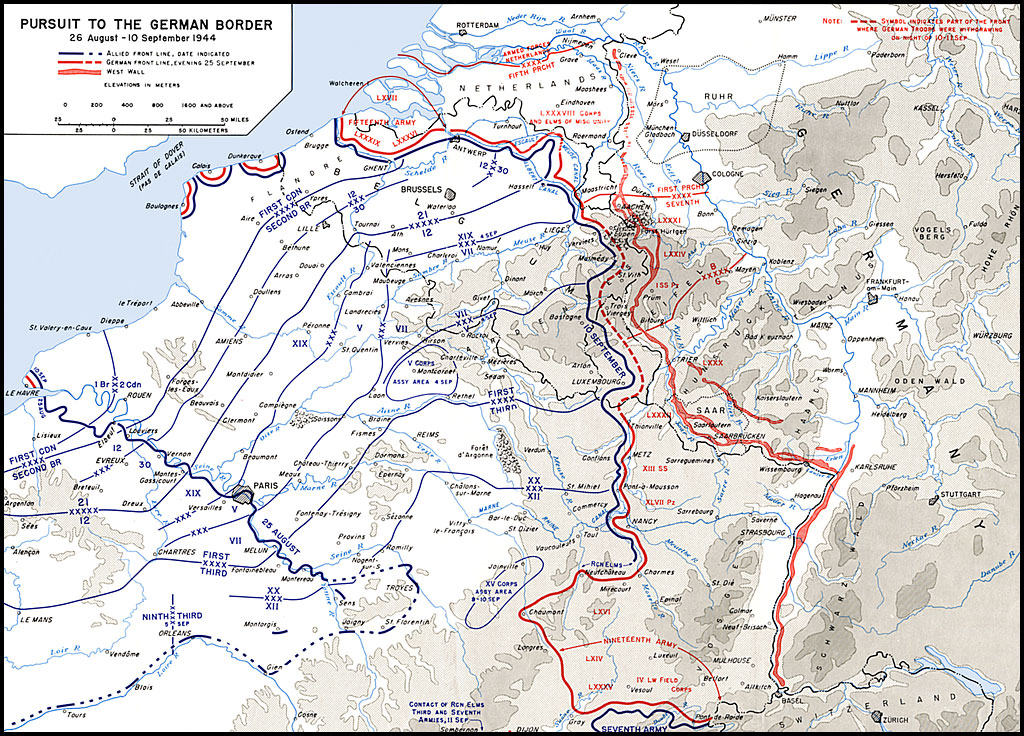
Allied pursuit to the German border, 26 August to 10 September 1944. Note the terrain confronting the American forces.

British General Sir Bernard Montgomery, the commander of the British 21st Army Group, remained in command of all ground forces, British and American, until 1 September, when the Supreme Allied Commander, General Dwight D. Eisenhower, opened his Supreme Headquarters, Allied Expeditionary Force (SHAEF) in France, and assumed direct command of the ground forces. This brought not just the 12th and 21st Army Groups under Eisenhower's direct command, but also Lieutenant General John C. H. Lee's Communications Zone (COMZ). Until then, Bradley had exercised control over the Communications Zone as the senior American commander on the continent. As such, he had prescribed stock levels in the depots and priorities for the delivery of supplies, and apportioned service units between the armies and the Communications Zone. Bradley believed that as the senior operational commander he should exercise such authority, as was the case in the British forces but, under the American organization, COMZ headquarters also functioned as that of the European Theater of Operations, United States Army (ETOUSA).

On 24 August, Eisenhower decided to continue the pursuit of the retreating German forces beyond the Seine. This stretched the logistical system to breaking point. Between 25 August and 12 September, the Allied armies advanced from the D plus 90 phase line, the position the Operation Overlord plan expected to be reached 90 days after D-Day, to the D plus 350 one, moving through 260 phase lines in 19 days. The planners had estimated that no more than twelve divisions could be maintained beyond the Seine, but by September sixteen were, albeit on reduced scales. Logistical forecasts were repeatedly shown to be overly pessimistic, imbuing a sense of confidence that difficulties could always be overcome.

The advance came to a halt in September. This was not a result of inadequate supplies or port capacity—there were still some 600,000 long tons (610,000 t) of supplies stockpiled in the Normandy lodgment area two months later—nor solely of a shortage of fuel. Rather, the problem was the inability to deliver fuel and supplies. Railways could not be repaired and pipelines could not be constructed quickly enough. Motor transport was used as a stopgap, but there was a shortage of suitable vehicles owing to political interference and production difficulties. Too few heavy trucks had been manufactured in the United States, and this compelled the use of the smaller general purpose GMC CCKW 2½-ton 6×6 trucks for long hauls, for which they were unsuited. The roads often had shallow foundations, and soon deteriorated under sustained use by military vehicle traffic and autumn rains.

Border battles, 5 September–22 October 1944

Logistical difficulties, in particular shortages of food, fuel, ammunition and spare parts, were indeed critical and constituted a drag on operations, but they were not the only factors that brought the Allied advance to a halt. The American forces also had to contend with rugged terrain, worsening weather and, above all, stiffening German resistance. American forces were widely dispersed and, with the logistical situation preying on his mind, a cautious Hodges ordered his corps commanders to halt when they encountered strong resistance. As American forces confronted the defenses of the Siegfried Line, priority shifted from fuel to ammunition.

== Supply depots ==
The comprehensive supply depot system envisaged by the Overlord planners did not exist in September 1944. The rapid advance led to the abandonment of Operation Chastity, the plan to develop Quiberon Bay as a port. In turn, this led to the scaling back of plans to develop a maintenance area in the vicinity of Rennes, Vitré, Laval, Segré and Châteaubriant. This left the maintenance area back in Normandy. A logical site further east would have been Paris, as it was a major communications hub, but SHAEF directed that a maintenance area should not be established around Paris. Eisenhower wanted to reserve Paris as a rest area for combat troops on furlough. He disapproved of the movement of COMZ headquarters to Paris, which was ordered by Brigadier General Royal B. Lord without Lee's permission. Soon COMZ headquarters occupied 167 hotels and the Seine Base Section another 129. By February 1945, 8,400 American and 700 British soldiers were arriving in Paris each day on 72-hour passes, but there were 21,000 troops stationed within 15 miles (24 km) of the city center, and another 140,000 in the Seine Department.

As a result, only some minor depots were established in the Paris area. The COMZ staff looked for suitable sites in the British zone around Antwerp in Belgium, but the British would not agree to this. In September, major depots were established around Liege to support the First and Ninth Armies and Verdun to support the Third Army; the COMZ staff would have preferred Nancy and Metz for the latter, but these areas were still in German hands. These depots began receiving supplies directly from the ports and the beaches in Normandy, and gradually became the base depots for Class I, II and V classes of supply (rations, clothing and equipment, and ammunition). They therefore acted simultaneously as base, depot and issue depots.

The opening of the port of Antwerp in November led to a flood of supplies that overwhelmed the depots around Liege and Verdun. To relieve the pressure on them, new maintenance areas were established around Mons and Charleroi. Major disruption of the supply system was caused by the German Ardennes offensive, which threatened the base depots. This prompted COMZ to halt the shipments to Liege and Verdun. Since cargo discharge operations had to continue at the port lest the tying up of shipping create a global shipping crisis, supplies piled up at the quays and on the rail lines. Representatives from the Army Service Forces (ASF) studied the situation in December 1944 and January 1945, and produced a series of recommendations. Lee took immediate action to establish the Class II and IV depots in Seine and Oise Base Sections and expand other depots in the Channel and Oise Base Sections. New depot areas were also established around Dijon and Nancy, and the supply depot system began moving towards the doctrinal ideal of a system of base, intermediate and advance depots.

== Winter clothing ==
=== Development ===
American troops stationed in the UK before D-Day led the life of garrison soldiers in a friendly country. Smart appearance was a priority, and the woolen serge service uniform was worn by headquarters staff and off-duty personnel. The jacket was hard to keep presentable in the UK where dry cleaning facilities were scarce, and pink trousers tended to show dirt, so many officers wore the dark olive drab ones instead. In particular, the M1941 field jacket came in for criticism because it required frequent washing, was difficult to iron, and the collar and cuffs tended to fray, resulting in a shabby appearance.

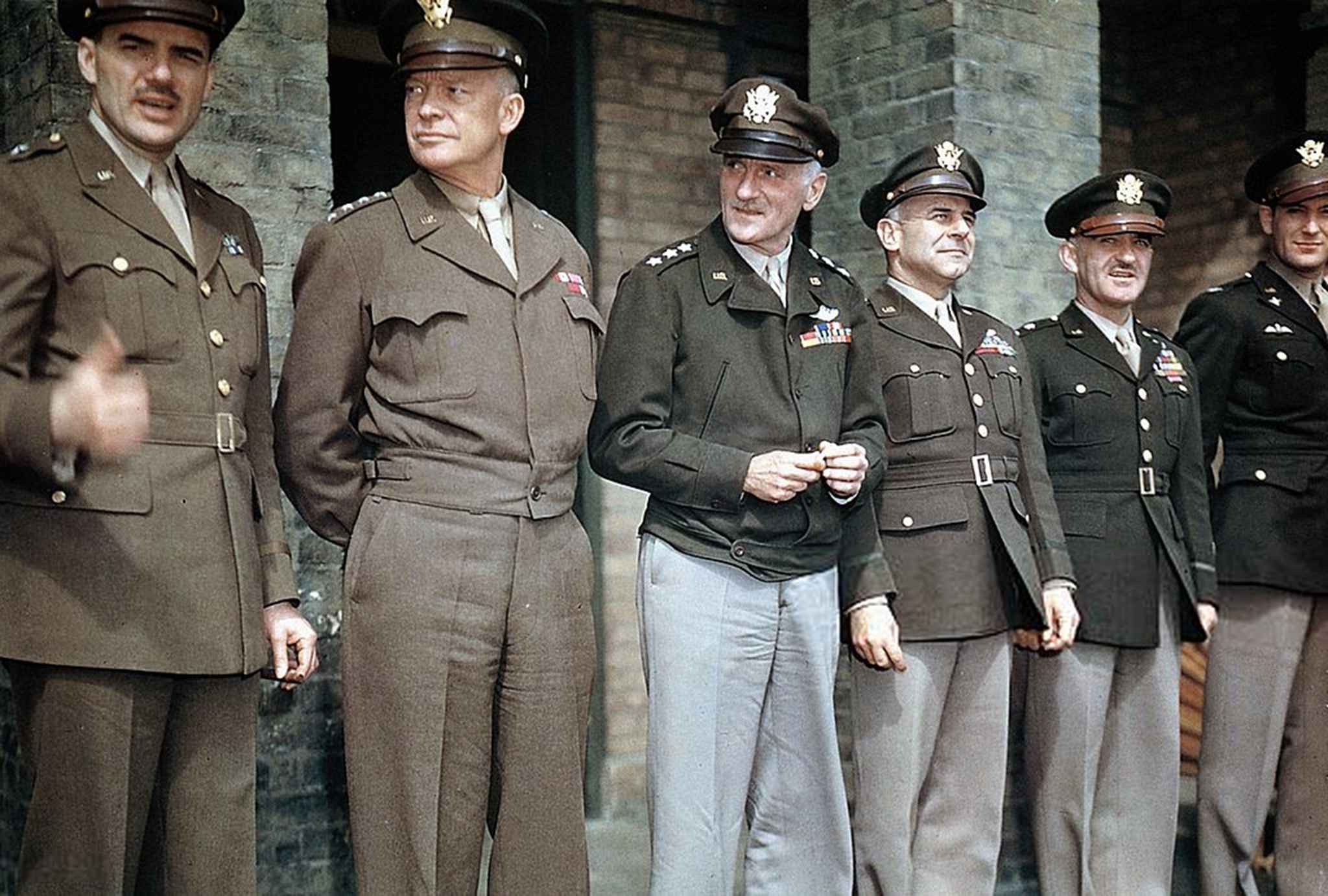
General Dwight D. Eisenhower (second from left) wears his Eisenhower jacket, a tailored version of the ETO jacket, while Lieutenant General Carl Spaatz (third from left) sports a prototype version made in the UK; the rest are wearing the serge service coat.

American officers were impressed by the British battledress. This paired high-waisted fishtail back trousers with a short jacket that fit snugly around the waist. As well as providing a smart military appearance, its heavy wool fabric was extremely durable, could be cleaned by scrubbing, and did not require ironing. A shrink-resistant cotton lining meant that it could be worn with or without undergarments. It was based on the British civilian custom of wearing trousers with a waistcoat, which differed from American civilian men's fashion with its low-cut trousers supported by a belt. Some American troops arriving in 1942 were issued with the British battledress, and it was well received. An American version was then developed in the UK, which became known as the ETO or Eisenhower jacket.

In March 1944, Eisenhower and Lee raised a requirement for 4,259,000 ETO jackets, of which 300,000 would be manufactured in the UK. The ETO quartermaster, Major General Robert McG. Littlejohn, met with Major General Lucius D. Clay at Army Service Forces headquarters. The British wool used in the ETO design was unobtainable in the United States, so the 18-ounce (510 g) serge used in the enlisted men's service coat was substituted. This defeated the purpose of a jacket that could be used as both a field and a dress uniform. It retained the more complicated features, making it hard to mass-produce. Clay did not believe that more than 2.6 million could be delivered by the end of 1944, and offered Littlejohn 479,000 M1941 jackets as substitutes.

Meanwhile, in the United States, the Quartermaster Corps had designed an entirely new winter uniform, the M1943 Uniform, based on the layered clothing principle. The centerpiece was the olive drab, 9-ounce (260 g), cotton sateen M1943 field jacket. The 3 1/2-pound (1.6 kg) M1943 field jacket was lighter than the 6 1/4-pound (2.8 kg) M1938 field overcoat, but laboratory testing showed that it kept the skin just as warm at both 0 °F (−18 °C) and 20 °F (−7 °C). Field tests were carried out in the Battle of Anzio.

Field jackets
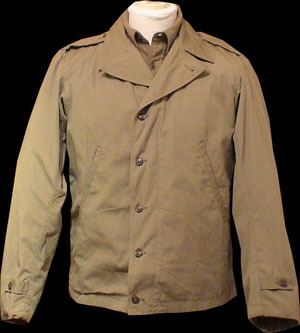
M1941 field jacket

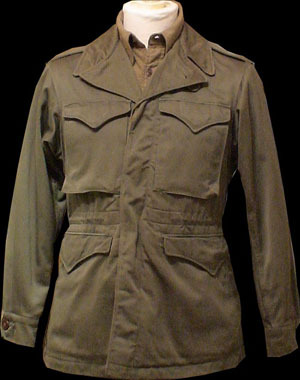
M1943 field jacket

Littlejohn did not like the M1943 jacket. The first troops he encountered wearing it were part of a Women's Army Corps unit that arrived in early 1944, and he was appalled to hear them refer to it as a "maternity jacket". (The women's version of the M1943 jacket did not have the breast cargo pockets. The M1943 field jacket was the opposite of the "neat and snappy" look he desired. He informed ASF that the ETO would not accept it, but would take the M1941 jacket until the ETO jacket was available. However, the M1941 was no longer in production, and in May 1944 shipments of the M1943 jacket commenced. He did accept the sweater that was part of the M1943 uniform, ordering 2,250,000 from the New York Port of Embarkation (NYPE), and he ordered 2,580,000 of the new woolen sleeping bags.

For protection against the rain, Littlejohn ordered 250,000 ponchos. These were preferred to the raincoats, as one size fit all, and they could be worn over the Mackinaw cloth overcoat. They were made from the same material as the raincoat; he would have preferred the nylon version, but these were reserved for use in the Pacific. He rejected the leather gloves of the M1943 because they hindered the use of the trigger finger, and asked for woolen ones instead. He also asked for shoepacs, rubber boots suited to wet conditions. The shoepac saw continuous development through 1943 and 1944, and were not standardized until 1945. All were earmarked for Alaska and the North African Theater of Operations (NATOUSA), and all that ASF could offer was 330,000 pairs of shoepacs of obsolescent designs, along with 900,000 pairs of ski socks, which could be worn with the shoepacs or larger-sized boots.

=== Issue ===
Troops participating in the assault phase of Operation Overlord were issued with a minimum amount of summer clothing and equipment; winter clothing was turned in before embarkation from the UK. The only replacement clothing carried was three pairs of socks. When the pursuit ended in early September, it was apparent that the troops had lost or discarded more equipment than had been worn out or destroyed in action, but large-scale salvage efforts were only just beginning, and their outcome could not be predicted. The provision of appropriate winter clothing was now more urgent than the replacement of summer clothing. Already the army quartermasters like the Third Army's Brigadier General Everett Busch were warning that it was starting to get cold on the front lines.

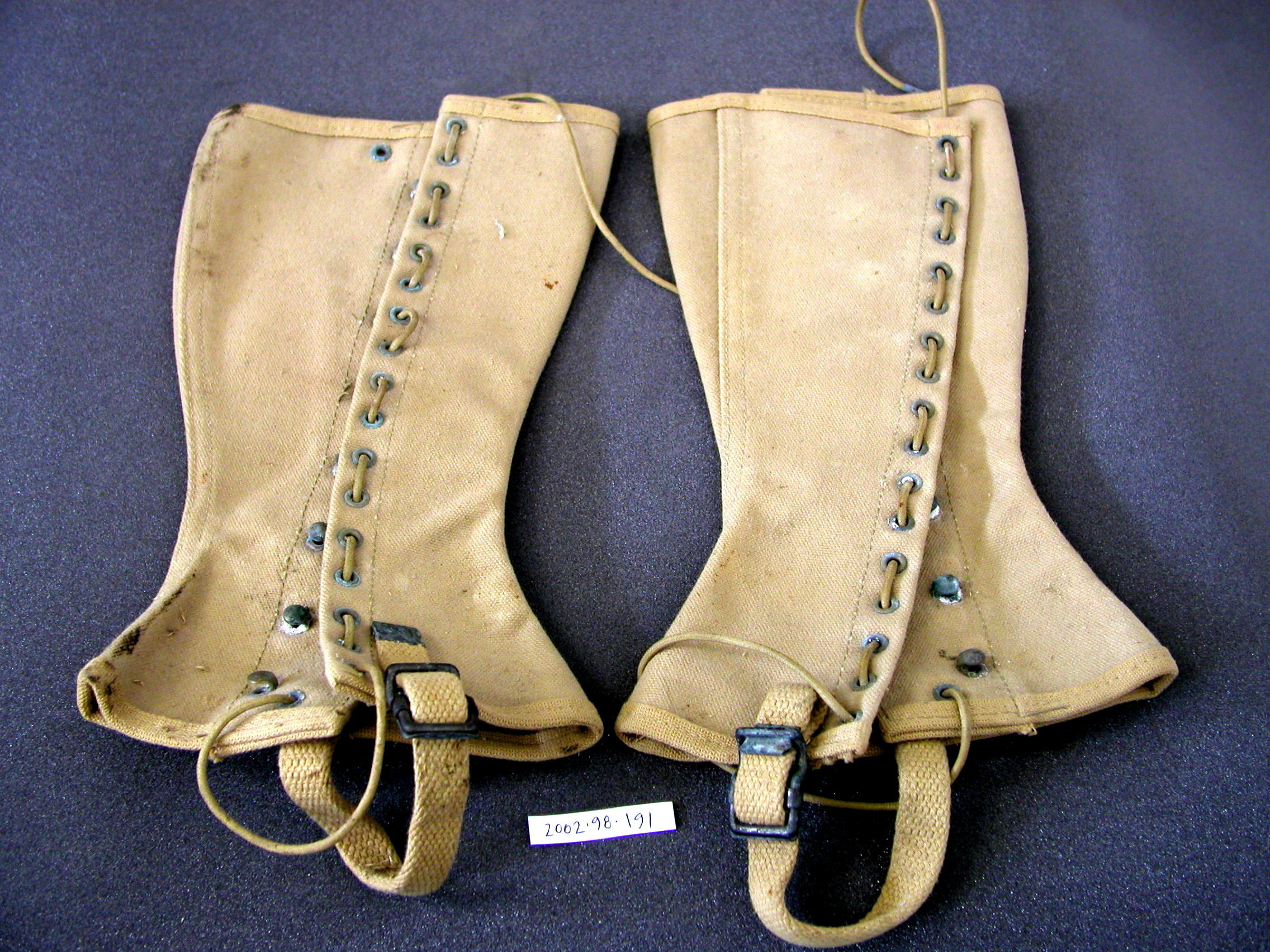
A pair of US Army M-1936 canvas leggings

Cold-weather clothing had not been a major item in the Operation Overlord planning, because the focus had been on the summer campaign in Normandy, and the campaign did not envisage the armies reaching the Ardennes or the Vosges, where cold-climate winter clothing would be vital, until May 1945. For the same reason, the medical annex of the Overlord plan did not mention cold injury, and the medical manual issued shortly after D-Day gave it only a brief mention, and recommended preventative measures that were impractical for troops in the field. Almost none of the troops had training in how to take care of their feet, and few medical or military officers had experience with cold injury.

Winter clothing was available, but not where it was most needed. Shipping was the main bottleneck; by the end of September, there were 75 ships loaded with quartermaster supplies awaiting discharge in the ETO, for which there were only fourteen berths. The situation hardly improved in October, at the end of which there were 80 ships and only 18 berths. Backlogs remained even after the opening of the port of Antwerp in November and were not cleared until February 1945. Between June and August 1944 some 55,000 long tons (56,000 t) of cross-Channel cargo tonnage was allocated to clothing and personal equipment, but only 53 percent of that had been shipped. Some 62,000 long tons (63,000 t) remained in the UK, but its priority was so low that it could not be shipped before October.

What had been shipped faced delays due to the overstretched and overburdened land transportation system. Of 54,200 long tons (55,100 t) of quartermaster Class II (which included clothing and footwear) and IV classes of supply unloaded at the ports in September, only 15,400 long tons (15,600 t) had been cleared, creating a 38,800-long-ton (39,400 t) backlog. By December, the backlog had grown to 88,600 long tons (90,000 t), and it was still 71,100 long tons (72,200 t) in January 1945. It fell to 28,300 long tons (28,800 t) in February. Of the First Army's average daily allocation of 4,076 long tons (4,141 t) in September, only 102 long tons (104 t) was set aside for Class II and IV supplies, and the average daily delivery was just 539 long tons (548 t).

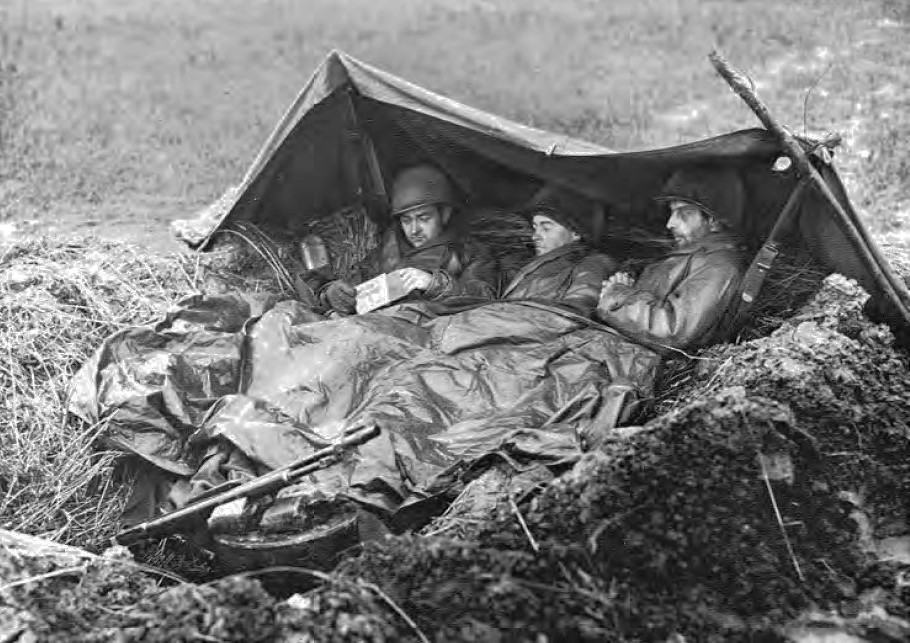
Keeping warm and dry was a major problem in forward areas, and cold and rain increased the incidence of cold injury like trench foot.

Littlejohn proposed that the allocation for rations and packaged fuel be reduced to allow for 50,750 long tons (51,560 t) of class II supplies, of which 10,000 long tons (10,000 t) would be winter clothing. Because the port of Cherbourg was so congested, he recommended that clothing for the Ninth Army in Brittany and the Communications Zone troops be brought in through the minor ports in Landing Ships, Tank (LSTs). He also wanted 6,000 long tons (6,100 t) for the troops in forward areas to be flown in by air, but the Assistant Chief of Staff (G-4) at COMZ, Brigadier General James H. Stratton, was unwilling to alter existing priorities laid down by the 12th Army Group, which gave precedence to fuel and ammunition, and Bradley supported him in this. Bradley accepted blame for his part in the situation that developed, later explaining that:

When the rains first came in November with a blast of wintry cold, our troops were ill-prepared for winter-time campaigning. This was traceable in part to the September crisis in supply for, during our race to the Rhine, I had deliberately by-passed shipments of winter clothing in favor of ammunition and gasoline. As a consequence, we now found ourselves caught short, particularly in bad-weather footgear. We had gambled in our choice and now were paying for the bad guess.

Littlejohn attempted to work around the low priorities. Three DUKW companies moving up from Normandy on 16 September to support a crossing of the Rhine were dispatched loaded with 300,000 sets of warm undergarments for the First Army. An LST was made available to ship winter clothing for the Ninth Army through uncongested minor ports in Brittany. Ships carrying 800 long tons (810 t) of rations were diverted from Cherbourg to Morlaix to free up trains for the carriage of winter clothing. Seventh Army, which was supported by the Southern Line of Communications (SOLOC) instead of COMZ, and drew its supplies from NATOUSA, received winter clothing by air on 26 September. Littlejohn struck a deal with Lieutenant General Carl Spaatz, the commander of the United States Strategic Air Forces in Europe for bombers to deliver 41 percent of the winter clothing required by the First and Third Armies to forward airstrips.

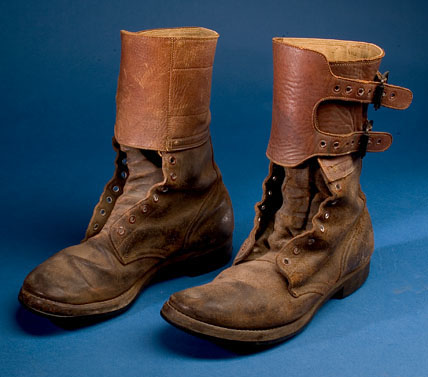
M-1943 combat boots

When the Third Army had moved from the UK to France in July, it had brought its duffel bags with it. These had been stored in the Normandy lodgment area. On 9 September, Busch asked the Advance Section (ADSEC) to move them forward. They were located and moved by truck to the nearest railhead by 25 September, but some had been pilfered and no longer contained their blankets or overcoats. In other cases, the contents were intact, but the owner had become a casualty. Some contained items duplicating ones that had already been re-issued. The cost of moving them forward was counted against the Third Army's rail transport allocation.

In contrast, the First Army had turned in its duffel bags in the UK before embarkation. The contents should have been salvaged, with the overcoats sorted and returned to the stockpiles, but this process was still incomplete in September, as the most experienced salvage units had been sent to France. The infantry divisions were given priority for receiving winter clothing, and a full issue was made in the First and Third Armies in early October, although there were some shortages of overshoes, raincoats and leggings that took until the end of the month to remedy.

The authorized number of blankets per man had been cut from four to two in the belief that the sleeping bag would replace the other two. No blankets were therefore shipped from the NYPE in August or September, but only 57,721 sleeping bags had been delivered instead of the expected two million. Littlejohn then placed an order for four million blankets. The NYPE responded by resuming the shipment of blankets in October and, by the end of the year, it had shipped two and a half million blankets and two million sleeping bags. In October, 6,000 of the new sleeping bags were issued to each of the divisions in the First Army, giving each man four blankets or a sleeping bag.

The issue of winter clothing in October depleted the stocks in the UK. To rebuild them to the authorized 45 days, and to build up 60 days' reserves on the continent where the troop basis was expected to rise from 1,601,700 men and women on 20 September to 2,673,600 by 31 December, new orders were placed with the NYPE in early October. The requirements included 1.5 million blankets, 600,000 overcoats, 900,000 pairs of overshoes, 2 million shirts, 3 million pairs of trousers, 2,110,000 sweaters and 2,270,000 sleeping bags. The orders totaled over 90,000 measurement tons (100,000 m^{3}), of which 62,400 measurement tons (70,700 m^{3}) was requested to be delivered on an emergency basis by the end of the month. To accomplish this, the NYPE had to make major adjustments to the convoy shipping schedules.

=== Footwear ===
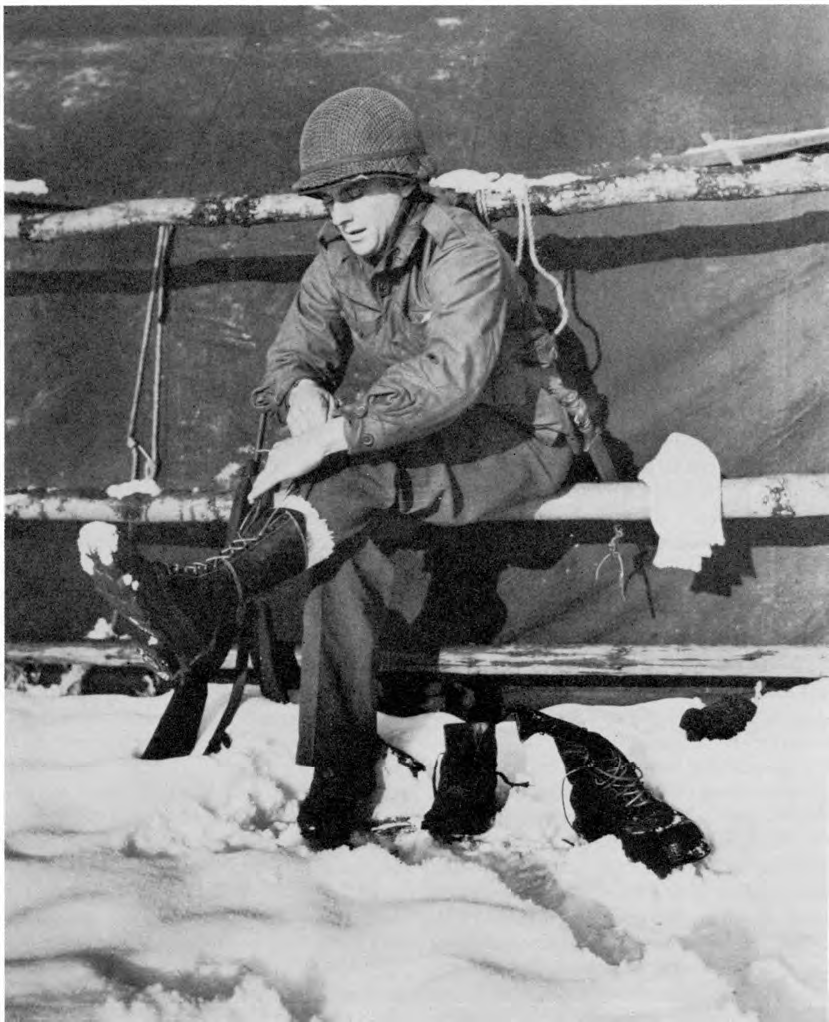
Shoepacs and wool ski socks are tried on by a foot soldier of the 4th Infantry Division on 25 January 1945. He has been wearing service shoes.

The issue of replacement factors, on which both manufacturing and reserves were based, was a complicated one. In the case of socks, the ETO allowance was three pairs of cushion-soled and two pairs of light or heavy woolen socks per man, for which the War Department's replacement factors were respectively 11.1 and 25 percent per month. So a pair of cushion-soled socks would last about nine months, and a pair of woolen socks for just four. But the former were in short supply, so heavy or (more usually) light socks were issued instead. Between June and August, 5.1 percent of cushion-soled socks and 55.4 percent of light socks had to be replaced. In October, the replacement factors for cushion-soled socks and other socks were raised to 25 and 33 percent respectively. In the meantime, Eisenhower had adopted a suggestion from the Surgeon General, Major General Norman T. Kirk, that every man be provided with a pair of clean socks each day. To provide for all the socks going to and from the laundry units, a temporary increase in the replacement factor to 33 percent was authorized.

According to the ETO Chief Surgeon, Major General Paul R. Hawley, "the plain truth is that the footwear furnished US troops is, in general, lousy." Except in the Seventh Army, almost all soldiers wore either combat boots or service shoes. The service shoe had to be worn with canvas leggings, which complicated taking them off for foot care. Their cut was such that they put pressure on the upper part of the foot, especially when heavy or extra socks were worn, and even when correctly fitted had to be laced up tightly, restricting blood circulation. Both the combat boots and service shoes fit too snugly, even when properly fitted, which was frequently not the case because there was a shortage of both in large and wide sizes.

The mix of sizes was based on World War I experience, but it appeared that the next generation was larger. Additional shoes and boots were usually issued in the same size as the original pair, but feet tended to widen after intensive physical training and marching. This precluded wearing several pairs of socks. Most soldiers had only one pair of shoes or boots, usually the one issued to them before D-Day. Crucially, neither the service shoes nor the combat boots were waterproof or even water resistant. The soles and seams leaked, and the leather was permeable. Dubbin was supplied to preserve the leather, but it did not make the shoes and boots waterproof.

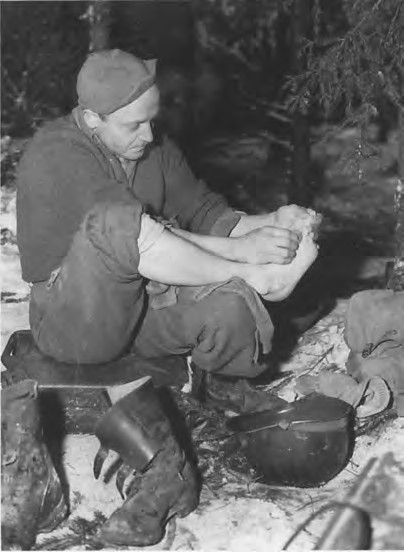
Proper care of feet. This soldier has been wearing combat boots.

The Seventh Army obtained 90,000 shoepacs through NATOUSA channels, and had them in time for the winter. The First, Third and Ninth Armies did not fare as well, and did not receive their initial issue until the second half of January. When it became clear the combat boot was not adequate for the conditions, Littlejohn placed an order on 8 December for another 500,000 pairs of shoepacs in addition to the 446,000 already shipped and those issued to the Seventh Army.

The shoepacs issued to the Seventh Army were of an old type, and those issued to the other armies were even older: they were too short for wading through water or mud, lacked heels and arch supports, and the rubber soles wore out too quickly. They had inadequate ventilation, and feet in them perspired even in quite cold weather. When it was cold, the inner soles froze, making the feet uncomfortably cold; when it warmed up they became wet. This set up a cycle of perspiration, maceration and ultimately hospitalization. A major contributing factor was insufficient training in their use. Those who learned how to wear them correctly came to appreciate them, and preferred them to combat boots in wet and cold weather.

Lacking proper footwear, soldiers in the field improvised. A favorite was to discard the service shoes or combat boots entirely and just wear the rubber overshoes with six or eight pairs of socks, or with boots made from army blankets. Only the Seventh Army was properly equipped with overshoes. In the Third Army, there was only one pair between four men in November; nine divisions were not fully equipped by December, and seven were still not fully equipped by January 1945. As with boots, large sizes were in short supply, but whereas there were ninety sizes of boots, there were only ten of overshoes. The shortage of large sizes was not remedied until March 1945.

Overshoes impeded fast movement and were difficult to carry, so they were often discarded before an attack. Armored infantry units could carry them in their vehicles, but they were often lost when a vehicle was knocked out in combat. Some of the older types were manufactured when rubber was in short supply, and had canvas tops which tore easily, leaked and soon wore out; these were superseded by an all-rubber design when more rubber became available.

== Medical ==
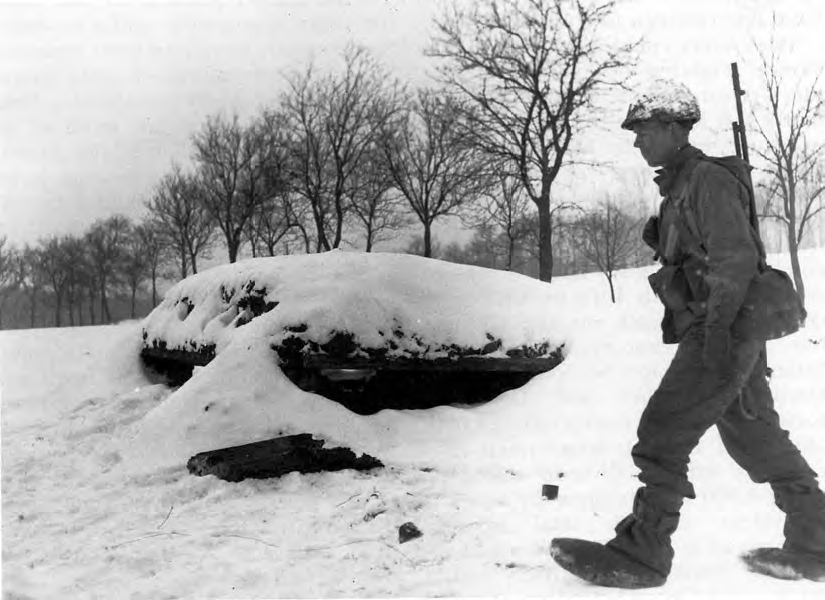
Sentry wearing improvised boots of straw-filled blankets

The winter of 1944–1945 in Northwest Europe was unusually cold and wet. In November and the first three weeks of December, the average daily temperature was around 40 °F (4 °C), and the daily minimum was seldom above freezing. This was accompanied by heavy rainfall that commenced in October. A cold front then passed through, and the average daily temperatures remained below or slightly above freezing until the end of January. American operations had been at a low tempo in late September and October, but Eisenhower decided that the logistical situation had improved sufficiently to warrant a resumption of major offensive operations. The Third Army commenced the Battle of Metz on 8 November, followed by the Seventh Army on 13 November, and the First and Ninth Armies three days later. The offensive was conducted over wet and often flooded terrain.

The weather conditions were conducive to cold injuries like trench foot, which is associated with wet conditions, in October and November, and frostbite, which is associated with cold weather, in December and January. But the weather was only one contributing factor. Inadequate clothing and footwear, keeping troops in the front line for excessive periods, and poor foot care were all important factors. Five weeks of fighting in November and early December cost the 12th Army Group about 64,000 battle casualties, and there were another 12,000 casualties from trench foot. Like the battle casualties, they fell disproportionately on the riflemen who were the army's fighting edge. Most of the trench foot casualties would never be declared fit for combat again, and many were crippled for life. In 1944–1945, there were 71,038 cold injury cases in the American forces in the ETO, of which 53,911 were trench foot, 13,134 were frostbite, 204 were chilblains and 3,789 were other ailments. The British and Canadian armies combined reported only 206 cases of cold injury.

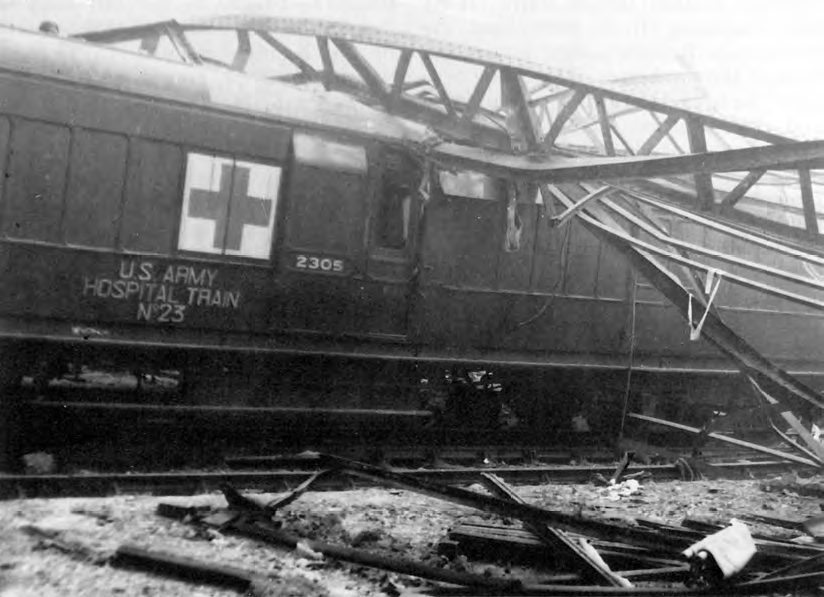
Wreckage of a hospital train after Gare Saint-Lazare bombing on the night of 26 December 1944

On 16 December, the American forces were struck by the Ardennes offensive, and there was particularly heavy fighting. The ADSEC hospitals around Liege started to fill up, and by 18 December thirteen hospital trains were running between Liege and the Gare Saint-Lazare in Paris. A lesser but significant number also arrived from the Third Army at the Gare de l'Est, and in January it also started to receive patients from SOLOC when the hospitals there became overloaded by the German Nordwind offensive. The patients included about 2,000 who had been evacuated from First Army hospitals that were threatened by the German advance, although only the 130th General Hospital at Ciney was forced to temporarily relocate. Some of the hospitals around Liege suffered casualties of their own from V-weapons, air raids and long-range artillery fire. The worst affected was the 76th General Hospital, which was struck by a V-1 flying bomb on 8 January 1945 that killed 24 staff and patients and wounded 20 more. The Gare Saint-Lazare was bombed on 26 December; a hospital train was destroyed and the station was put out of action for 48 hours. Three more hospital trains were temporarily put out of action when an ammunition dump in the Normandy Base Section exploded.

By 28 December, the hospitals of the Seine Base section around Paris were almost full, with 14,000 patients. Where possible, patients were moved to hospitals in the Normandy and Brittany Base Sections. Evacuation to the UK by sea and air was disrupted by bad weather, and also had to be halted twice when the hospitals in the UK Base Section threatened to overflow. In all, 85,000 patients were evacuated to the UK by the sea shuttle running between Cherbourg and Southampton in December, January and February. Starting in February, the Air Transport Command began flying 2,000 patients a month across the Atlantic. A total of 24,666 patients were moved from the UK to the United States by air and sea in January, followed by 29,743 in February, and 30,410 in March.

== Ammunition ==
=== Shortages ===
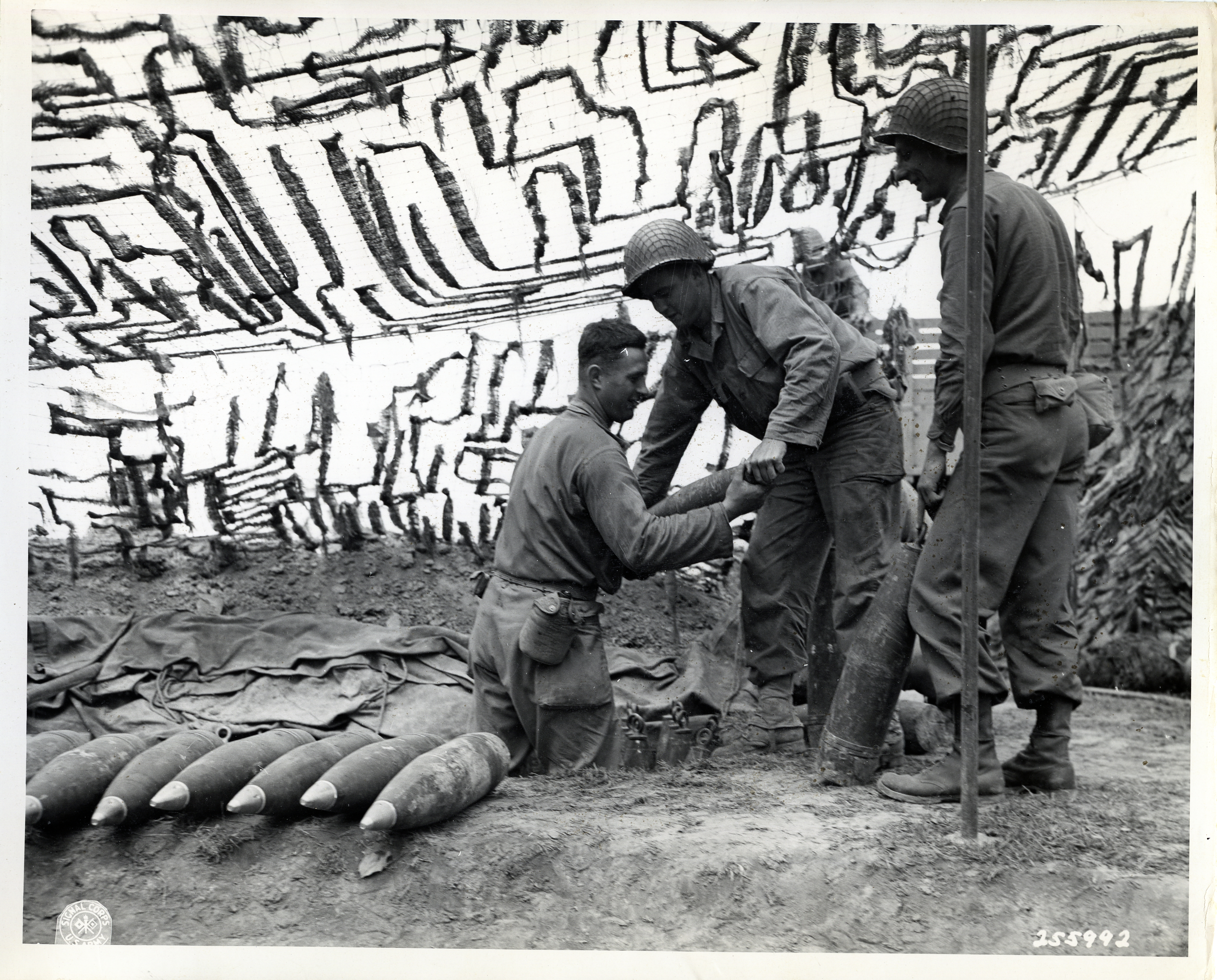
Artillery men with 155 mm ammunition

Ammunition usage is difficult to forecast, as it is dependent on tactical and operational factors that are difficult to predict. Moreover, different tactical circumstances demand different calibers and types of ammunition. Ammunition shortages developed in the early days of the campaign in Northwest Europe that increased casualties, delayed operations and lengthened the war. The principal causes of the shortage of artillery ammunition in the ETO in 1944 and 1945 varied over time:

- from June to November, there was insufficient discharge capacity over the beaches and through the ports;
- between August and October, supply lines were overstretched and inadequate to move enough ammunition to the front lines; and
- from November 1944 to April 1945, there was insufficient production of ammunition in the United States.

American tactics relied heavily on fire support, so the ammunition shortage had a severe effect on operations, especially in October when the armies were facing the defenses of the Siegfried Line, and it ruled out major offensives. The First Army's operations were restricted to the Battle of Aachen, and the Third Army had to call off the Battle of Metz owing to ammunition shortages. The main weapon of the divisions was the 105 mm howitzer, for which 12th Army Group recommended an allocation of 65 rounds per gun per day. In the week ending 21 October, the First Army fired 30 rounds per gun per day of 105 mm ammunition for a total of 109,469 rounds, while the Third Army fired just 1.1 rounds per gun per day for a total of 3,401 rounds. It was a similar story with the 155 mm howitzers; the First Army fired 15 rounds per gun per day, expending 24,341 rounds in total, while the Third Army fired 0.4 rounds per gun per day, expending a total of 553 rounds. Most of the First Army's fighting was around Aachen. Between 11 October and 7 November, the Third Army fired 76,325 rounds of all calibers, which represented barely one day's usage during the high-intensity operations in the Ardennes in December.

During September, the priority at Cherbourg was disembarking more troops, and worsening weather affected unloading over the Normandy beaches. As a result, only two ammunition ships were unloaded in the first week of October. Lee conducted a search of abandoned ammunition dumps in Normandy, and discovered 4,000 long tons (4,100 t) of ammunition. He also had LSTs loaded in England so ammunition could be discharged over the beaches at Le Havre. The quantity of ammunition unloaded each day rose slowly during October, although the target of 6,000 long tons (6,100 t) per day was not met until 23 October, when 7,617 long tons (7,739 t) were unloaded. Unloading peaked at over 10,000 long tons (10,000 t) per day on 4 and 5 November, but then fell as the backlog of ammunition ships awaiting discharge was cleared, and thereafter discharges were dependent on receipts from the United States, which averaged 6,614 long tons (6,720 t) between 19 October and 12 November. Most of this was shipped directly to the army depots, but by the time Operation Queen began on 16 November, the ADSEC depots held nearly 10,000 long tons (10,000 t) of ammunition.

=== Workarounds ===
The armies worked around the shortages in several ways, usually through ammunition rationing. The 12th Army Group also attempted to impose limits on ammunition usage but, unlike the armies, it was not an administrative formation, and as such had no control over the distribution or disposition of ammunition. The rationing system tended to aggravate shortages, and encourage wasteful competition between the armies. The first army to recognize that a particular type was going to be in short supply could requisition as much of it as possible, thereby initiating the shortage and depriving the other armies of their fair share. The rationing system was not responsive to the tactical situation, and units facing a German counter-attack on the sixth day of the ration week might not know how much ammunition would be available beyond the next two days. Rationing encouraged wasteful shooting to use up the ration or falsified expenditure reports to create secret reserves.

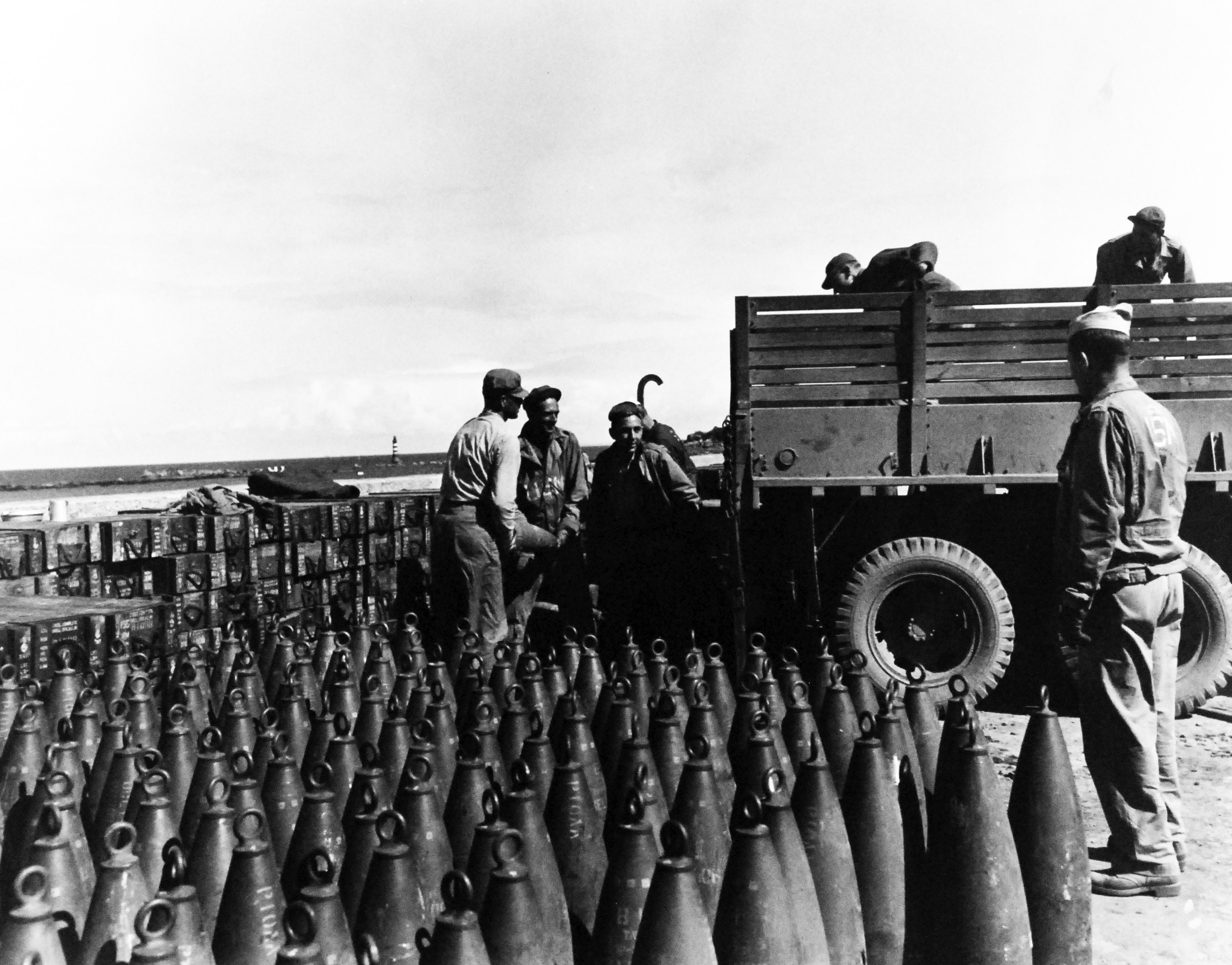
US Navy Seabees loading ammunition at Roscoff

On 11 October 1944, the 12th Army Group announced a credit system, which became operative once sufficient stocks were built up in the ammunition depots around Liege, Soissons and Verdun. Under this system, the 12th Army Group allocated stocks of ammunition in the depots to the armies on a monthly basis. Requisitions by the armies had to show the credit number. Although it required more bookkeeping, it gave the 12th Army Group a better picture of the stockpile. The credit system prevented over-requisitioning, and since ammunition was allocated to a particular army, it discouraged waste and encouraged conservation in quiet periods.

The armies regarded the credit system as less than ideal for two reasons. Firstly, rationing remained in effect, so although they might have ammunition, they might not be able to use it. Secondly, there was still uncertainty about future deliveries. The 12th Army Group resolved the former by abolishing rationing on 5 November, and attempted to ameliorate the latter by providing 30-day forecasts, which were updated every ten days. The credit system did not guarantee an adequate amount of ammunition, but it did enable the armies to make the best use of what they had.

In some cases, shortages could be alleviated by the substitution of non-standard ammunition. Although better than nothing, this decreased range, accuracy and effect. Formations could also switch weapons, employing tanks, tank destroyers and anti-aircraft guns for which ammunition was more plentiful in lieu of field artillery. Three battalions were equipped with British 25-pounders, for which ammunition could be obtained from the 21st Army Group.

Another alternative source of ammunition was stocks captured from the Germans during the rapid advances in August and September. Captured dumps near Verdun and Soissons contained French 155 mm howitzer ammunition, which was identical to that of the American 155 mm Howitzer M1. Between 26 September and 6 November 1944, the Third Army's XX Corps usage of this caliber was entirely drawn from captured stocks, and the First Army M12 Gun Motor Carriages fired 7,000 rounds of captured ammunition, mostly against concrete emplacements in the Siegfried Line. French Canon de 75 modèle 1897 ammunition was compatible with the 75mm gun M2–M6 used in the Sherman tank, and in the Battle of Fort Driant a tank battalion used exclusively French ammunition. German 8 cm Granatwerfer 34 ammunition was found to be compatible with the American 81 mm M1 mortar, and the First Army fired 300,000 rounds. Some artillery battalions were equipped with captured weapons, and the XX Corps attack on Maizières-lès-Metz on 10 October was supported by captured German 88 mm guns and 105 mm howitzers, Soviet 76.2 mm guns and French 155 mm howitzers. It was reported that German ammunition contained a higher proportion of dud rounds than American ammunition.

=== Sorting ===
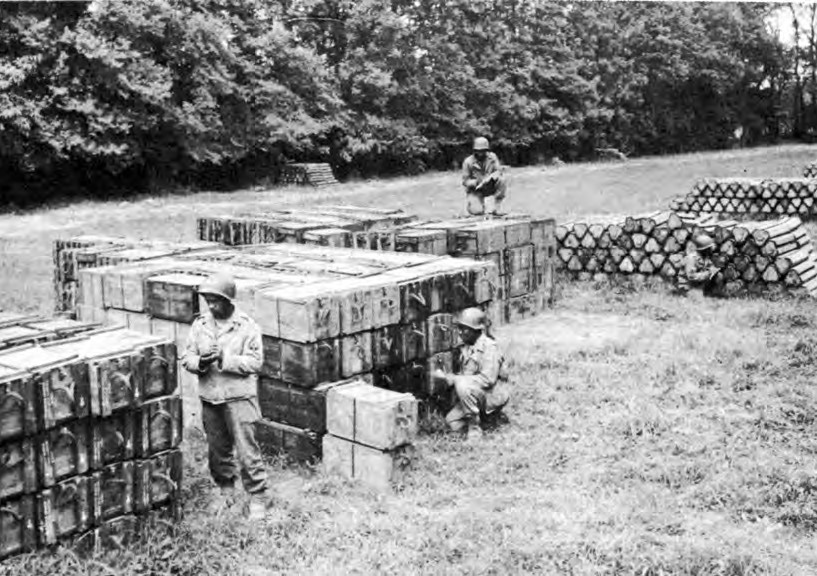
Ammunition is sorted by type to facilitate issue.

It was much easier to identify stocks of artillery ammunition than spare parts. For camouflage purposes, shells were painted olive drab, except for chemical rounds, which were gray. The filler was indicated by colored bands: yellow for high explosive; purple for incendiary on olive shells; green for poison gas; red for tear gas; and yellow for smoke on gray shells. The packaging gave the standard nomenclature and the lot number, which consisted of the manufacturer's initials and a serial number. Maximum accuracy required that the ballistic properties of the ammunition be absolutely identical, but this was difficult to achieve under wartime mass-production conditions with the technology of the time. The best assurance of identical ballistic properties was therefore to fire ammunition from the same lot.

Ideally, ammunition would be delivered to a battalion in lots of at least 500 rounds, but there were many places between the factory and the field battery where lots could be broken up. Frequently small, mixed lots were received from the ports, and until November the pressure to unload ammunition over the beaches and move it forward as quickly as possible militated against preserving lot integrity. A survey of the ammunition drawn by five field artillery battalions between 27 and 30 September from the same ammunition supply point indicated that the average number of rounds per lot varied from 8.2 to 29.9. An examination of the stocks of 105 mm howitzer rounds at one Third Army ammunition supply point revealed that there were 7,445 rounds from 308 lots. By 3 November 1944, the First Army had spent 25,000 man-hours segregating lots by hand.

The NYPE attempted to ensure that ships were loaded with the largest number of rounds per lot and the fewest number of lots, and that lots were stowed together. Starting in November, all US ammunition entered the ETO through just three ports, where unloading was supervised by an ordnance detachment who ensured that the lots were not broken up. Railroad cars were loaded with ammunition from only one lot, and all the ammunition unloaded from a particular ship was dispatched to a single ammunition depot. In turn, the armies attempted to draw lots from the depots to a single ammunition supply point.

=== Production ===
The United States was not as fully mobilized as its Allies or opponents, and American production, while great, was not outstanding, considering its large population, well-developed pre-war industrial and technological base, and access to raw materials. Munitions production peaked in the last quarter of 1943, after a War Department Procurement Review Board headed by Major General Frank R. McCoy had recommended cuts in production on the grounds that excessive stocks had been built up in the United States and overseas theaters. The Ordnance Department strongly objected to this on the grounds that stocks were not excessive, and that the expenditure rates in the North African campaign might not be indicative of those of the campaign in Northwest Europe, but to no avail. Unlike other items of supply, there was no agreement on what was an adequate supply of ammunition.

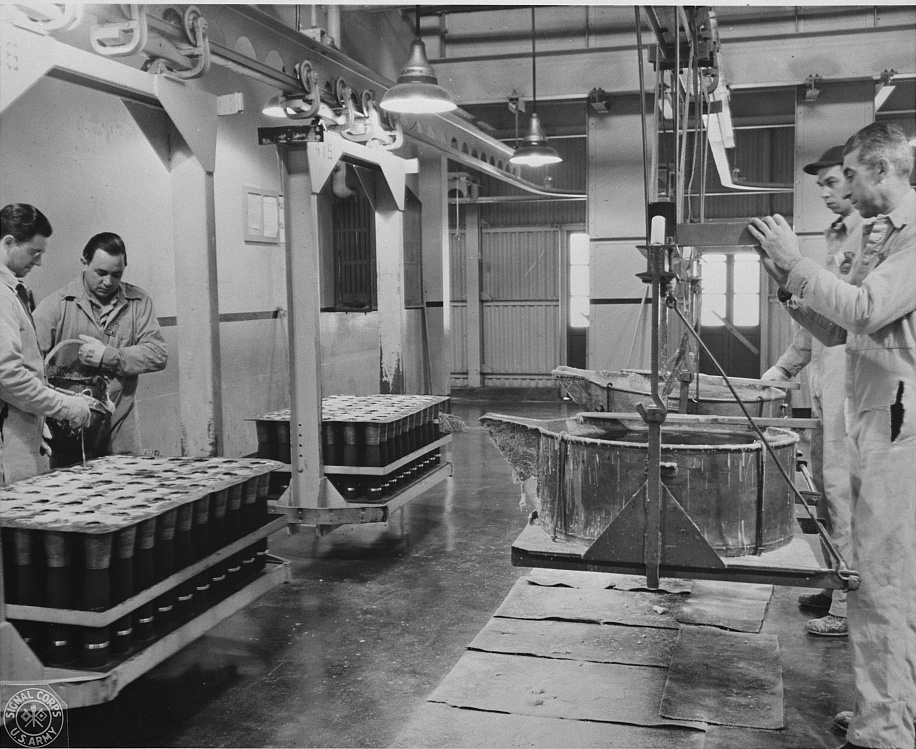
Molten TNT is poured into 75 mm shells at a large Midwest loading plant.

To avoid overproduction, the Army Service Forces directed that war production in 1944 would be strictly limited to what was listed under the Army Supply Program. As a result, many ammunition plants were closed or converted to the production of other goods. This particularly affected the larger calibers, from the 155 mm gun and 155 mm howitzer, through to the 8 inch howitzer, 8 inch gun and 240 mm howitzer, because US Army thinking in 1942 was that medium and heavy artillery was not sufficiently mobile for operations in Europe, and that aircraft could replace heavy artillery. On that assumption, medium and heavy artillery pieces and their ammunition were given a low priority for production, and were repeatedly cut back in the Army Supply Program, thereby saving steel and shipping space.

This decision began to be reversed in March 1944, when orders went out to increase production of 240 mm artillery ammunition to 40,000 rounds per month. This was followed in April by orders for increased production of 8 inch gun, 8 inch howitzer, 155 mm gun, 155 mm howitzer and 4.5 inch gun ammunition; the authorized increase in production for 155 mm howitzer ammunition was particularly large: an increase of 1,303,000 rounds per month. Around $203 million (equivalent to $2.87 billion in 2024) was spent on new facilities to replace the ones that had been closed just months before.

By November 1944, shell shortages had led to rounds being shipped directly from the factories as soon as the TNT filler had cooled. Between January 1944 and February 1945, the percentage of rounds shipped directly from the plants rose from 28.6 to 50.12 percent. Direct shipment saved about ten days' travel time and about $1,000 (equivalent to $14,000 in 2024) per railroad car in dunnage and haulage costs.

On 1 December, the Ordnance Department was directed to step up production of light and medium artillery and 60 mm and 81 mm mortars, with production of 155 mm gun ammunition to be increased from 400,000 to 600,000 rounds per month. Manpower was the most critical limitation. Many women were hired for jobs that were formerly done by men, and in some plants half the employees were women. To provide more skilled machinists, tool makers and machine operators, the commander of ASF, General Brehon B. Somervell, released servicemen to work in foundries, and furloughed up to 2,500 men for ninety days at a time to help manufacture 105 mm artillery ammunition. In December 1944, the Office of War Mobilization asked the War Department to draft men under the age of 38 who voluntarily left essential industrial employment. Some 71,000 men fell into this category, of whom 12,000 were declared fit for service and drafted.

== Tanks ==
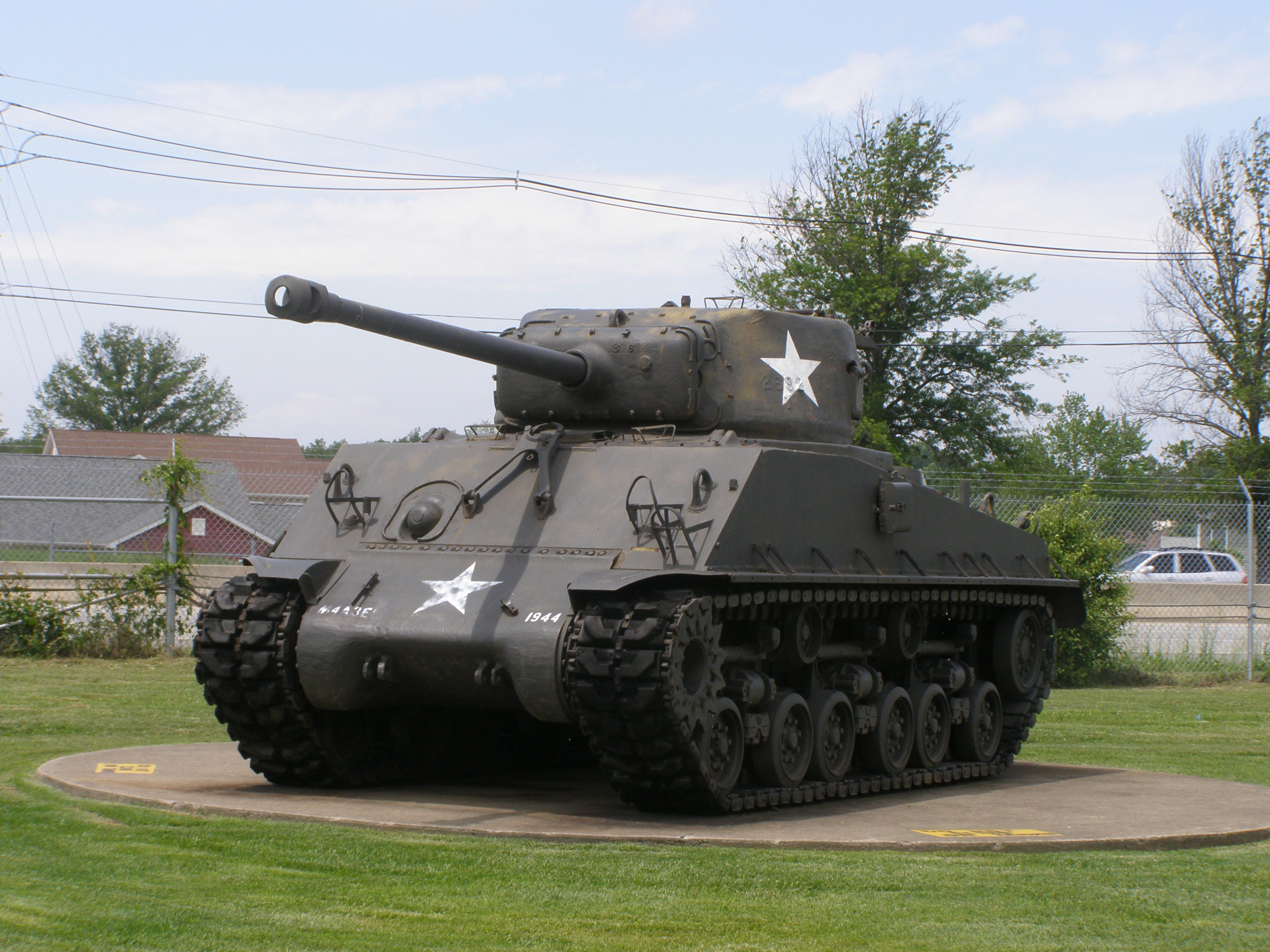
A late model Sherman tank with high velocity 76 mm gun and horizontal volute spring suspension

Before D-Day, ETOUSA expressed concerns that the loss rate for tanks would be higher than the War Department's 7 percent per month replacement factor, but the War Department was reluctant to authorize an increase without data based on actual combat experience. Actual losses were considerably higher. Tank losses in August and September respectively had been 25.3 percent and 16.5 percent of establishment.

Reserves became depleted, and it became impossible to keep tank battalions at full strength. To share the available tanks more equitably, the First Army adopted temporary tables of organization and equipment (TO&E) that cut the number of medium tanks in the 2nd and 3rd Armored Divisions from 232 to 200, in the rest from 168 to 150, and in separate tank battalions from 54 to 50. The Ninth Army soon adopted the same temporary tables. By November, the 12th Army Group had only 3,344 tanks against a TO&E requirement of 3,409 and an authorized reserve of 937; two tank battalions had fewer than ten serviceable tanks, and most had between 75 and 90 percent of their TO&E.

In December, ETOUSA asked the War Department for an additional 1,010 tanks to be shipped in addition to the 250 scheduled to arrive in January 1945. At this point, the First Army was engulfed in the fighting in the Ardennes, and it lost nearly 400 tanks in December. ETOUSA asked for a loan of 75 tanks designated for the Mediterranean Theater of Operations, United States Army (MTOUSA) that had been unloaded in Marseilles, on the understanding that they would be replaced from the tanks being shipped in January. The MTOUSA Theater commander, General Joseph T. McNarney, agreed to release 150 tanks. An approach was then made to Montgomery, who agreed to release 351 Sherman tanks from British stocks. He could afford to do this because the British Army had amassed a reserve of 1,900 Shermans in the UK that had been acquired under Lend-Lease. It was decided to allocate the entire American production to the US forces until they built up a reserve of 2,000 tanks, but this was not expected to occur before mid-1945.

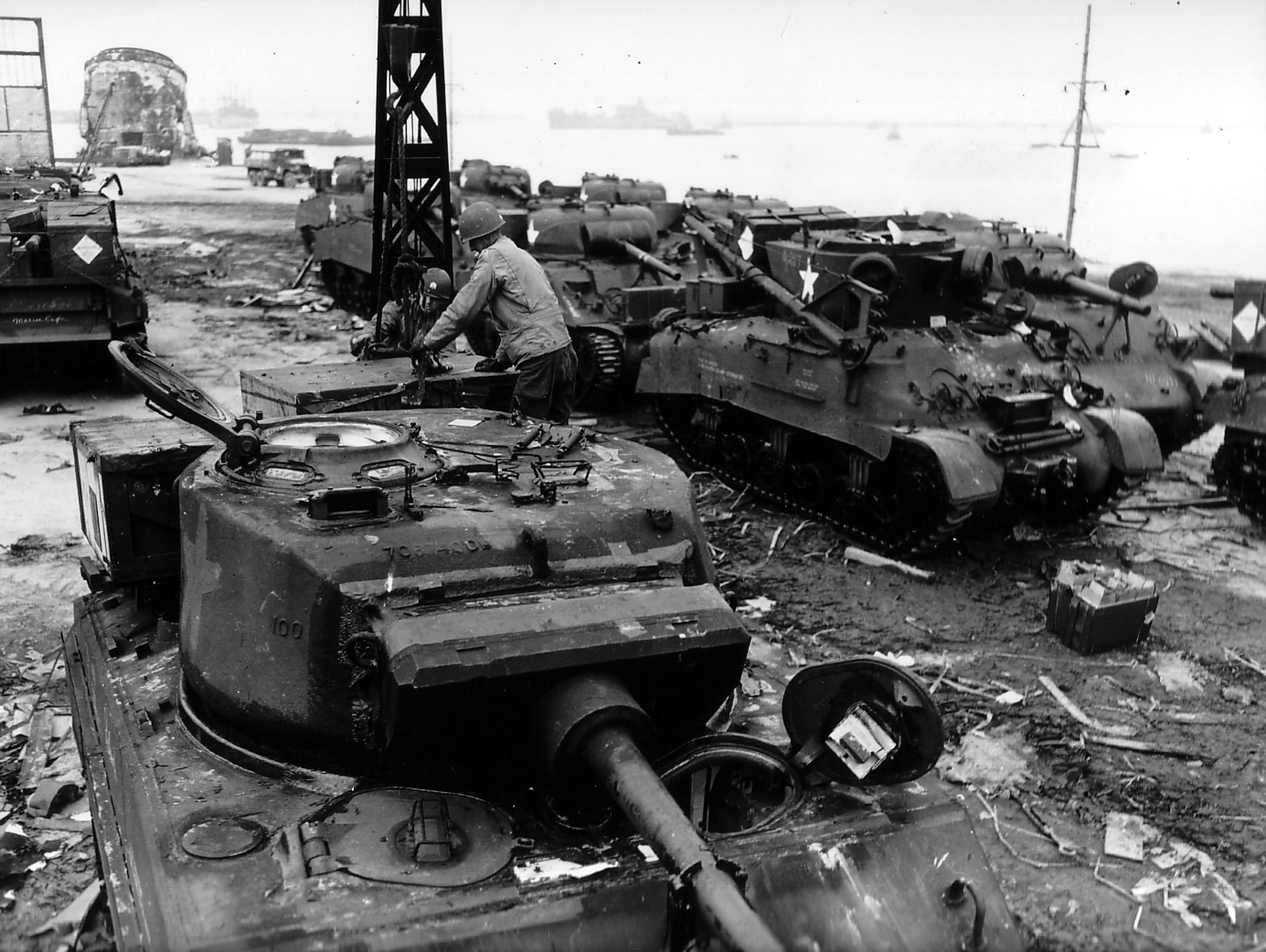
Tanks are serviced on arrival at Cherbourg.

A casualty of the tank shortage was the plan to improve the quality of the American armored forces. Under the circumstances, ETOUSA had no choice but to continue to accept deliveries of the obsolescent Shermans armed with the 75 mm gun, although the NYPE gave priority to shipping the 76 mm gun version. Deliveries of the latter fell behind schedule, partly because of the change to the horizontal volute spring suspension necessitated by the heavier gun, and partly due to retooling for the new 90 mm gun tank. Not until January 1945 did the theater feel able to request that no more 75 mm gun Shermans be shipped.

Plans to upgrade 300 Shermans with the British 17-pounder like the 21st Army Group was doing had to be shelved because there were no spare tanks to upgrade. Improved ammunition in the form of high velocity armor piercing rounds became available for the 76 mm gun, but less than two rounds per gun per month were received before March 1945. Shermans armed with the 105 mm howitzer met the need for a tank with a more powerful high explosive armament, and were available in sufficient numbers, but they proved a disappointment due to the lack of a powered turret traverse. This was remedied, but Shermans so equipped were not received by the NYPE until April 1945. Meanwhile, it began shipping the replacement for the Sherman, the M26 Pershing, to the ETO in January 1945.

== Rations ==
In the wake of the pursuit to the German border, stocks of rations fell to their lowest level on 9 September, when the First Army reported that it had only one and a half days of rations on hand, and the Third Army reported that it had less than one day's worth. This was mainly due to transportation difficulties causing deliveries to fall short of requirements. Only 260,000 rations were delivered to the First Army on 11 September, 100,000 less than its strength, and average daily issues in the Third Army for the period from 8 to 13 September were 153,000 rations, about 60,000 less than its actual strength. At the same time, the number of prisoners of war that ADSEC had to feed rose from 150,000 to 1,500,000. Rations were supplemented with captured German stocks. The Third Army seized 1,300 long tons (1,300 t) of frozen beef and 250 long tons (250 t) of canned meat at Homécourt on 9 September, and the First Army captured 265 long tons (269 t) of fresh beef at Namur on 13 September.

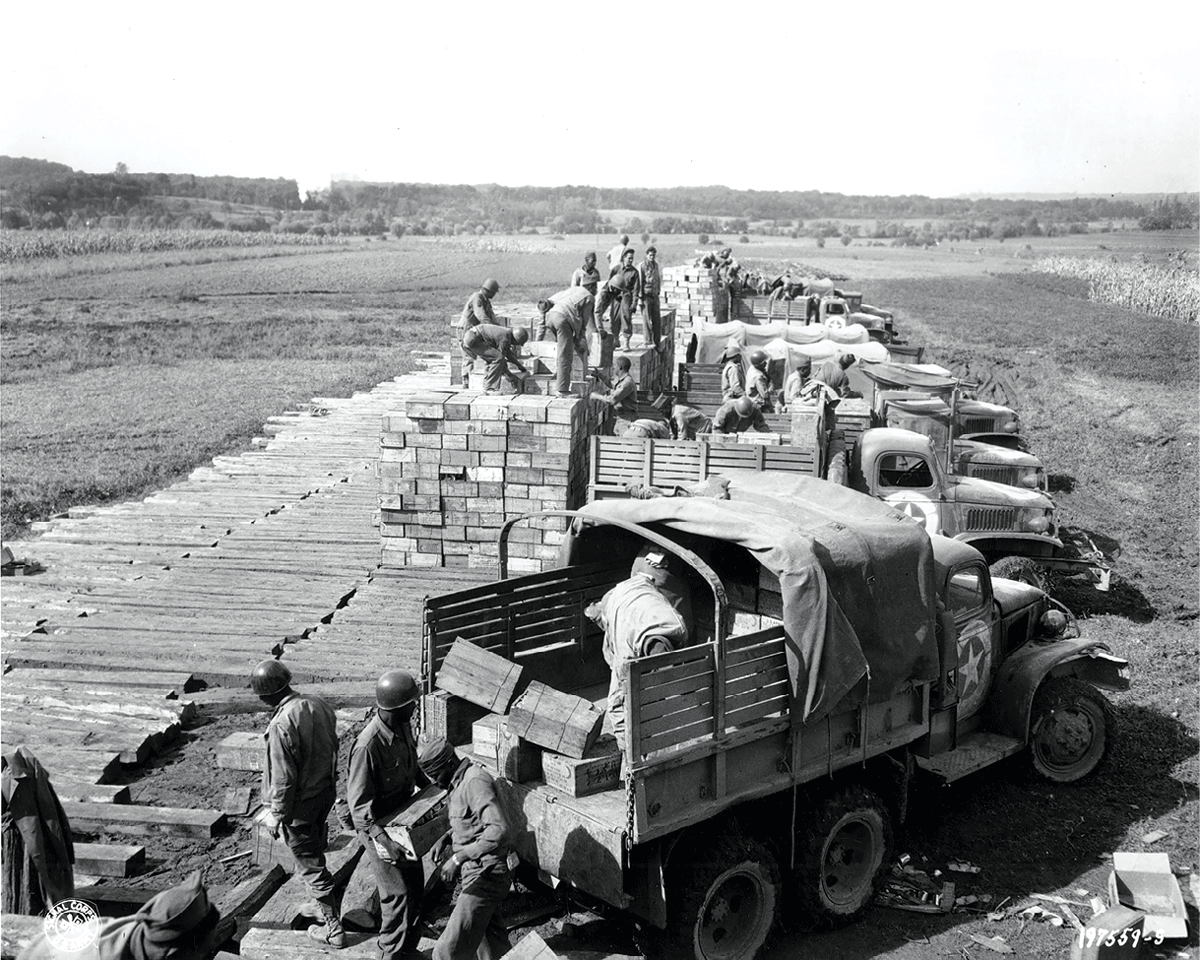
Soldiers load trucks with combat rations in preparation for a convoy to the front line on 21 December 1944.

Captured stocks also provided some relief from monotonous diets. During the pursuit, transportation difficulties and tactical considerations had led to the widespread consumption of operational rations, the C ration, K ration and 10-in-1 ration, especially in the combat zone, and they represented 48 percent of the ration consumption instead of the planned 18 percent. For a while it looked like the stocks of operational rations would run out. This prompted a 7 September order from Littlejohn that combat units in the combat zone would be issued with 38 percent B rations and those in the communications zone with 95 percent B rations. The A ration was the standard garrison ration; the B ration was the same, but without its perishable components.

Keeping the components of the A and B rations "balanced", that is, in the correct proportions so the cooks could follow the Army menus and avoid having to serve the same meals too often, was a frustrating task. Although commodity-loaded ships came with balanced rations, some components might have been substituted for others by the originating depots or the NYPE. On arrival in the theater, the shiploads could become mixed up when they were unloaded onto trains, or the trains could get mixed up during shunting. Pilferage was also a problem at every stage. By September there were 63,212,685 pounds (28,672,792 kg) of unbalanced supplies. Since the armies had almost no reserves, if they were issued unbalanced rations then that was what they ate.

Stock levels eventually recovered, and by the start of the November offensive the First Army had 13.4 days of supply, the Third Army had 5.9, the Ninth Army had 9.8, ADSEC had 4.8, and COMZ had 10.6. COMZ continued to forward rations directly to the armies until the last week of November, when the depot system became operational, with Depot Q-179 at Liege serving the First and Ninth Armies, and Depot Q-178 at Verdun supplying the Third Army. During the German Ardennes offensive, the First Army drew rations from the ADSEC depots around Liege while its forward depots were hastily evacuated. The temporary suspension of deliveries caused an accumulation of rations at Depot Q-171 in Cherbourg. With the permission of the mayor, the depot commander, Colonel Chapin Weed, arranged for several streets to be blocked off so they could be used for open storage. In this manner the contents of an entire ship could be kept together and the rations kept balanced.

Although operational rations provided the required nutrition, this was only the case when all the components were consumed. To preserve the health of the troops, Littlejohn wanted to provide fresh produce for soldiers who had been eating operational rations for over a month. Before D-Day, the British government set aside civilian-operated cold storage facilities in the UK for American needs. When the first commodity-loaded reefer ships arrived from the US carrying perishables earmarked for American troops on the continent, they were unloaded in the UK and transferred to refrigerated coasters for the trip to France. The first of these, the coaster Empress of Athol, anchored off Omaha Beach with 489 long tons (497 t) of meat and butter on 15 July, and was unloaded by DUKWs. It made two more trips at weekly intervals. On 31 July, the SS Albangarez arrived at Cherbourg with 2,500 long tons (2,500 t) of perishables, which were distributed by the 3612th Transportation Corps Refrigeration Companies and the 279th and 484th Quartermaster Refrigeration Companies, which were equipped with refrigerated trailers.

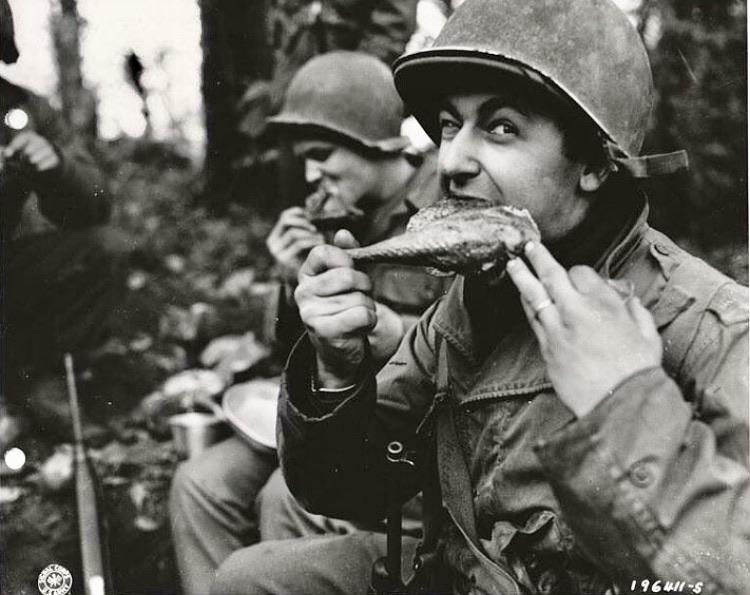
Celebrating Thanksgiving in November 1944

The ETO had a fixed allocation of five fast reefers with a capacity of 23,000 deadweight tons (23,000 deadweight metric tons) and five slow ones with a capacity of 12,000 deadweight tons (12,000 deadweight metric tons). Since the number allocated to the theater was fixed, monthly shipments to the theater depended on turnaround times. Assuming six weeks for the fast vessels and seven for the slow ones, the NYPE could deliver 22,500 deadweight tons (22,900 deadweight metric tons) per month. This proved unachievable; cargoes were seldom discharged in less than three weeks. Littlejohn therefore asked the NYPE to cut shipments for October by 15,000 long tons (15,000 t), and November by 10,000 long tons (10,000 t). The NYPE did not like this idea; an idle reefer was likely to be transferred to the South Pacific. To allow for longer turnaround times, Littlejohn suggested that shipments of processed meats such as bologna, cervelat and salami might be shipped in regular dry storage, thereby saving about 33 percent of reefer space, and permitting longer turnarounds. This proved practical, and during the winter months they were delivered with little spoilage, as were fresh eggs.

The long turnaround times were the result of several factors. The delivery of perishables was a complicated task involving many components that had to work in concert, and for some time the required coordination was lacking. When a reefer arrived, extraneous deck cargo had to be removed before the hatches could be opened. Unloading was usually performed by DUKWs since quayside berths were scarce until Antwerp was opened. Arrangements would be made for the 2nd Military Railway Service to provide a train of reefer cars. These cars had to arrive at the port in plenty of time so the cars could be cleaned, cooled and then inspected by the Veterinary Corps. A complete train was preferred, as a few cars attached to a train carrying other goods were unlikely to retain their priority and were liable to be delayed en route. The slow turnaround of reefer cars made it harder to assemble the next train, which in turn slowed ship turnaround. By 31 December 1944, there were 509 refrigerated cars on hand, of which 181 were American and the rest were German, French, Belgian and Italian.

The number of meat meals served in the Communications Zone was cut back from twelve to seven per week in October to allow for turkey to be provided to the troops for Thanksgiving. Poultry was not normally on the military menu because it was bulkier than beef or pork; a turkey meal required three and a half times the refrigeration space of a regular meat meal. The commitment to provide a turkey dinner had been made before the implications of the rapid advance in September had been fully understood, but it was felt that the effect on morale would be severe if the Army reneged on the promise. In November, the SS Great Republic arrived with a cargo that included 1,604 long tons (1,630 t) of turkey, which was distributed by refrigerated vans.

== Liquid fuels ==
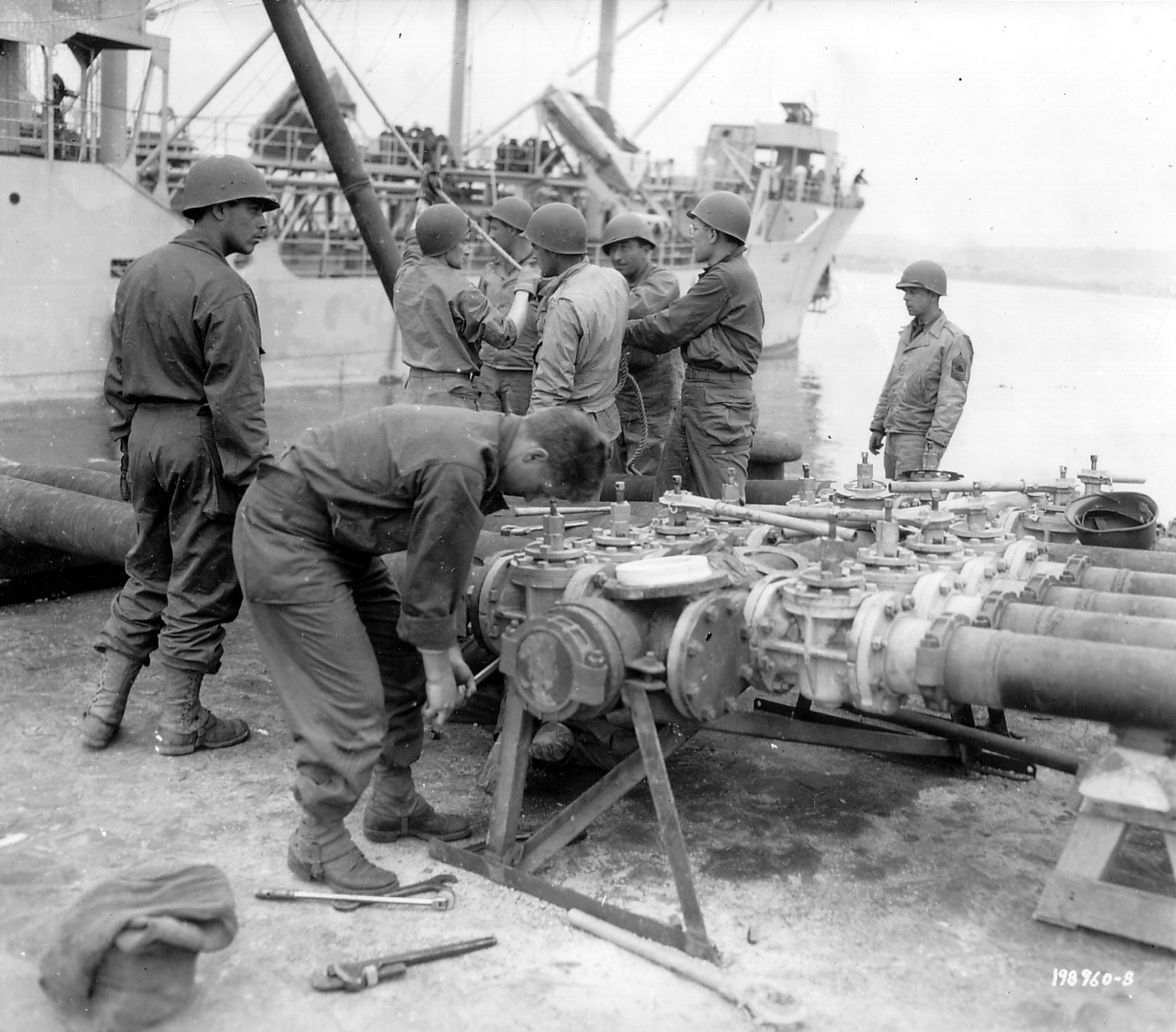
Unloading the oil tanker SS Empire Traveller at the Digue de Querqueville in Cherbourg

In September both the armies and the Communications Zone were beset with a shortage of fuel. By the third week in September, the Third Army, which was trying to get across the Moselle River, reported that it had less than a half a day's supply on hand; the First Army, facing the Siegfried Line, reported that it had none at all. Even the Communications Zone only had a day and a half's worth on hand in the first week of October. By this time, requirements for MT80 gasoline (80 octane fuel for vehicles) for forces operating beyond the Seine had risen to 1,616,600 US gallons (6,119,000 L) per day, which was 5,900 long tons (6,000 t).

Part of the problem was the rate of consumption, which reached a record high of 248.3 long tons (252.3 t) per division slice per day in September. It dropped to 197.2 long tons (200.4 t) in October, and then to 164.2 long tons (166.8 t) in November. In planning for its future needs, the Chief Petroleum Officer at ETOUSA, Colonel Elmer E. Barnes recommended 207 long tons (210 t) per division slice. At the same time the proportion of MT80 was raised: in pre-D-Day planning it had been assumed that 79 percent of consumption would be in the form of MT80, but in practice MT80 accounted for 90 percent of consumption. ETOUSA therefore requested that 85 percent of shipments be MT80.

It was uncertain whether this volume could be handled. In September there were only two terminals on the continent in Allied hands where bulk petroleum could be received: Cherbourg and Port-en-Bessin in Normandy. The latter was dependent on tombolas, flexible floating ship-to-shore pipelines that allowed oil tankers to discharge while anchored offshore. These were subject to disruption from rough weather, which damaged two tombola berths in the first week of October, forcing tankers to divert to Cherbourg. Cherbourg also had limitations; there was only one tanker berth, on the exposed Digue de Querqueville. It too was subject to disruption by bad weather; a storm on 4 October destroyed eight of the ten intake pipelines and halted discharge for eight hours, and slowed it for another twenty-four. The storage facilities at Cherbourg could hold 250,000 US barrels (30,000,000 L) of MT80, which was initially thought to be ample, but was soon revealed to be insufficient. A pipeline was laid to connect Cherbourg with the Minor System storage tanks around Port-en-Bessin.

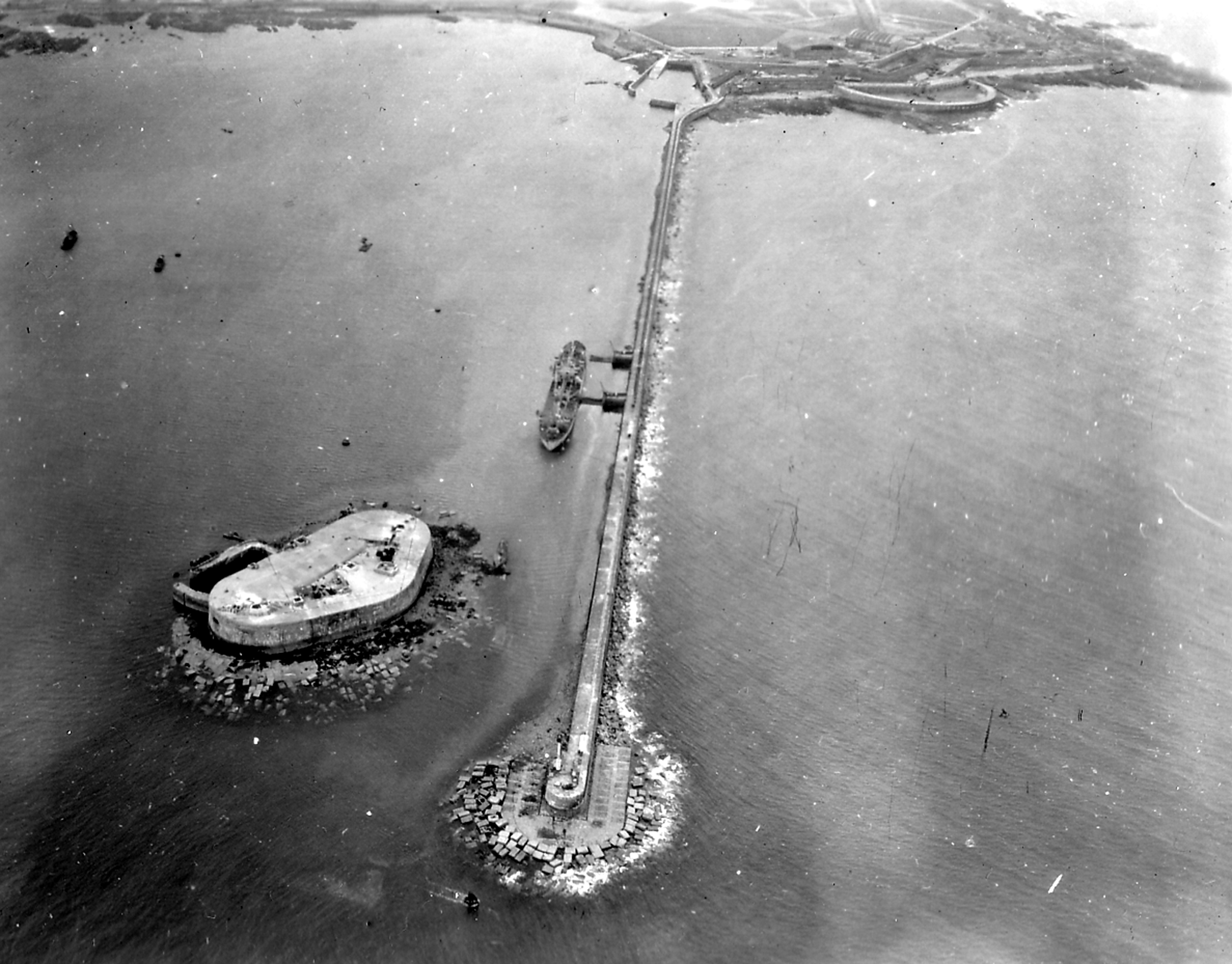
A tanker discharges at the Digue de Querqueville in Cherbourg.

The Major Pipeline System had its origin at Cherbourg, but in September its construction lagged far behind the advancing armies. Of its three 6-inch (15 cm) pipelines, the most advanced had reached Chartres, which was 20 miles (32 km) short of the Seine. A second pipeline reached Alençon, and the third was back at Domfront. Two trains per day were devoted to hauling the pipes and other materials for the pipelines, but progress was slow. The first pipeline did not reach Coubert, where storage tanks were available, until early October, and the other two lines did not reach it until December. Coubert remained the eastern terminal of the pipeline system until construction resumed in January 1945. Between them the Major and Minor Systems had 950 miles (1,530 km) of pipelines and a storage capacity of 850,500 US barrels (101,410,000 L). On 23 September the responsibility for the pipelines was taken away from base sections and placed under the Military Pipeline Service, under the command of Colonel John L. Person, who reported to the Chief Engineer of ETOUSA.

From the second week of October, US forces were authorized to draw up to 500 long tons (510 t) per day from the British-operated terminal at Ostend. Work was also begun to develop capacity at the Seine ports, which had been allocated for American use. At Le Havre, the petroleum handling and storage facilities were captured relatively intact. Tankers could discharge into barges or coastal tankers that could take the fuel up river to Petit-Couronne, or into storage tanks at Le Havre, which were connected to Port-Jérôme-sur-Seine via a 10-inch (25 cm) pipeline. It was estimated that Le Havre could handle 5,000 long tons (5,100 t) per day, of which 3,000 long tons (3,000 t) would be cleared using the pipeline. The first bulk fuel was discharged at Le Havre on 31 October, but the pipeline was not operational until December, and decanting and loading facilities at the three ports were not completed until January 1945.

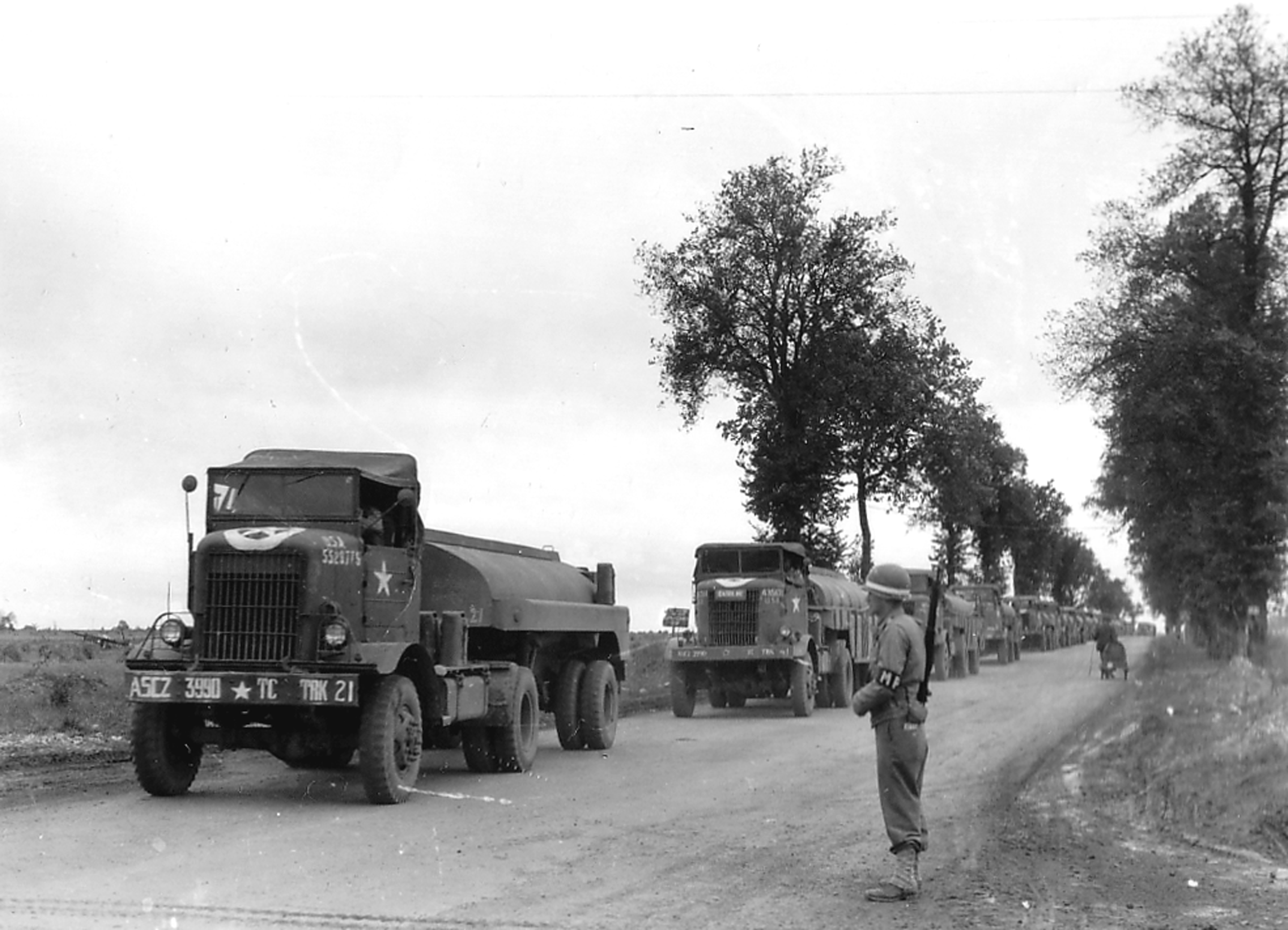
A column of tank trucks of the 3990th Quartermaster (Transportation Corps) Truck Company

Antwerp promised greater capacity, and its storage facilities could hold up to 1,260,000 US barrels (150,000,000 L), of which the US forces were allocated 950,000 US barrels (113,000,000 L). The first tanker berthed at Antwerp on 3 December. Plans called for laying a 6-inch (15 cm) pipeline for MT80 and four 4-inch (10 cm) pipelines, of which two were for MT80 and two for avgas. Work began on 8 December; it proceeded from multiple points at once, and reached Maastricht by the end of January 1945. The pipehead there was eventually supplying 30,000 US barrels (3,600,000 L) per day.

Although gasoline arrived in bulk in tankers, most was issued packaged in 5-US-gallon (19 L) jerricans, of which there was a serious shortage owing to wasteful practices during the Normandy campaign. By the end of November, a million discarded or abandoned jerricans had been recovered, but 500,000 were still missing. It had been intended that decanting would be carried out by COMZ, but due to the slow progress of pipeline construction, by mid-September the armies were receiving fuel in bulk in tank cars and tank trucks which brought it from the pipeheads at Chartres and Alençon, or directly from Cherbourg. Large shipments of packaged fuel continued to be made from Cherbourg, which totaled 1,600 long tons (1,600 t) by truck and 800 long tons (810 t) by rail in October, but decanting operations at Chartres were hampered by mud and rain. The Military Pipeline Service located an abandoned autodrome at Linas, where it built storage tanks.

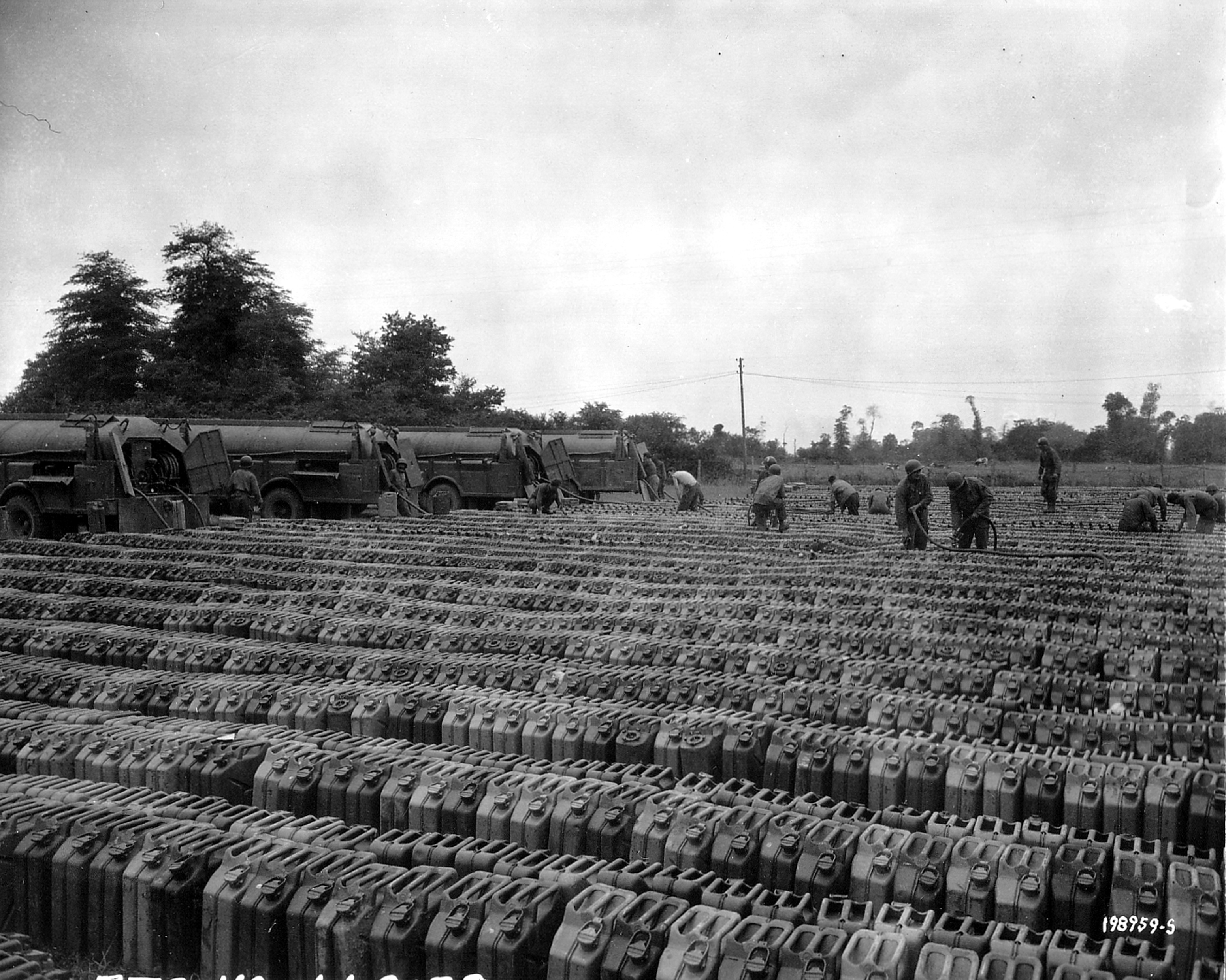
The 3820th QM Gas Supply Company of the 95th QM Battalion refills jerricans from tanker trucks.

The armies began doing their own decanting, but these efforts met with mixed success. The proper dispensing equipment was not always available, and was often operated inefficiently. Fuel deliveries were sporadic and unpredictable. In November, ADSEC established large depots around Liege to serve First and Ninth Armies, and around Verdun to serve the Third Army. Movements of jerricans to and from Cherbourg were halted, and henceforth all forward movement of fuel was in bulk over the pipelines or by rail. With the opening of Antwerp, fuel for First and Ninth Armies was landed there or at Ostend and transported in tanker cars to Liege, where it was decanted into jerricans. Fuel for the Third Army came from Cherbourg, went to Chartres by pipeline, and then by tanker car to Verdun, where it was decanted. By mid-December, the First Army had 7 days' supply of fuel on hand, the Third Army had 8.8, the Ninth Army had 12.8, and the Communications Zone had 12.03, when the American forces were struck by the German Ardennes offensive. German air raids hit the Third Army decanting point at Mancieulles and the COMZ pipehead at Coubert; a backup facility for Coubert was established at Grisy-Suisnes.

During the German Ardennes offensive, the First Army's depots at Spa and Stavelot, which held 12,300 long tons (12,500 t) (about 3,000,000 US gallons (11,000,000 L) of fuel, lay directly in the path of the German advance. The First Army Quartermaster, Colonel Andrew T. McNamara, suspended all deliveries of fuel to the truckhead at Bütgenbach. He was given a report from the intelligence section that the Germans were relying on captured fuel to sustain their offensive, so he ordered the truckhead to be evacuated, and sent 600 trucks to the Spa and Stavelot fuel dumps to move their contents back to railheads, where he arranged with ADSEC for trains to take it away. Over the next three days all but 120,000 US gallons (450,000 L) was evacuated; this was burned to form a roadblock. The German Kampfgruppe Peiper captured 50,000 US gallons (190,000 L) of fuel at Honsfeld, and a fuel dump near Malmedy was set on fire by American troops to prevent its capture, with the loss of 124,000 US gallons (470,000 L), but a nearby dump containing 2,000,000 US gallons (7,600,000 L) was evacuated without loss. By the end of December, the First Army's stocks of POL had dropped from nearly 3,500,000 US gallons (13,000,000 L) to less than 400,000 US gallons (1,500,000 L).

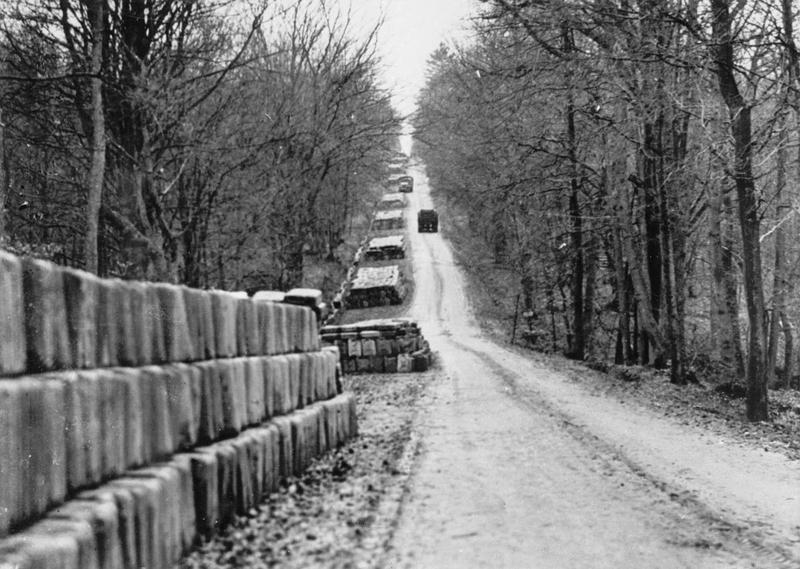
Fuel dump near Stavelot, Belgium

Some 4,000 long tons (4,100 t) of Class II and IV supplies were evacuated from the supply depot at Eupen and the ration depot at Welkenraedt. Attempts were made to keep the ammunition supply points open as long as possible, and two were overrun. The main ordnance depot was evacuated, as were the hospitals around Malmedy and the engineer stores at Elsenborn, but the map depot at Stevelot was lost. Stocks of Bailey bridge equipment were too large to remove, but were rendered inoperable by removing key components. At the ammunition dumps, first priority for possible destruction was accorded to the highly secret proximity fuzes. The ADSEC fuel depots around Liege came under attack from V-1 flying bombs. A V-1 attack on 17 December started fires that resulted in the loss of 400,000 US gallons (1,500,000 L). German Ar 234 jet bombers attacked Liege on 24 December. Shipments to Liege were halted, and trains hauling bulk fuel were halted at Charleroi, where the fuel was decanted. Once the operational situation was stabilized, the logistical one returned to normal in February 1945.

== Solid fuels ==
Coal was required for many military purposes, mainly for coal-burning locomotives, but also for heating hospitals and barracks, cooking, roasting coffee, and providing hot water for baths and laundries. Coal differed from other supplies in that all of it came from the UK or was procured on the continent. In preparation for operations in Northwest Europe, 14,000 long tons (14,000 t) of coal in sacks and 855 long tons (869 t) of bulk coal were set aside for use in the first six weeks. Thereafter coal would be supplied only in bulk. The first sacks of coal arrived in July, three weeks later than planned, and demand was higher than expected due to the requirement to provide coal for public utilities in Cherbourg and later Paris. The advance beyond the Seine and the consequent rapid expansion of the railway network, early liberation of Paris, and the onset of cold weather in September greatly increased the demand for coal, but receipts fell well short of demand. Storms in the first five days of September delayed shipping from the UK and no coal was unloaded. Cherbourg was unable to handle the planned 2,500 long tons (2,500 t) per month due to a shortage of appropriate railway cars, Granville did not open until the end of September, and a shortage of suitable coasters limited the use of the minor ports for coal traffic.

It had been anticipated that the retreating Germans would destroy the coal mines, as they had done in World War I, but the coalfields were overrun before this could occur. A September survey by the SHAEF Solid Fuels Section found 980,000 long tons (1,000,000 t) in above-ground stockpiles, 15,000 long tons (15,000 t) in loaded railroad cars, and 98,000 long tons (100,000 t) on barges that were landlocked due to canal obstructions, but only some 98,000 long tons (100,000 t) of this was of the type suitable for use in locomotives or coal gas generating plants. Eisenhower directed the SHAEF missions to France, Belgium and the Netherlands to negotiate for coal supplies under Reverse Lend-Lease. The Solid Fuels sections of SHAEF's G-4 (logistics) and G-5 (civil affairs) branches were combined, and the section swelled to over 400 Allied personnel. In November, the British agreed to ship another 25,000 long tons (25,000 t) of coal from the UK.

The stoves and water heaters in the combat zone were designed to burn liquid fuel, so the major user was the Communications Zone. Nonetheless, the monthly requirement of the 12th Army Group and the Ninth Air Force in the winter of 1944–1945 was 81,000 long tons (82,000 t). Deliveries fell well short of this; the Third Army was allocated 18,000 long tons (18,000 t) per month, but received only 8,166 long tons (8,297 t) in December. Where possible, wood was substituted for coal. The French allocated 372,500 cords (1,350,000 m^{3}) of cut timber for American use, but this proved insufficient. A procurement and woodcutting program was instituted, but in January 1945 firewood production was only 36,000 cords (130,000 m^{3}) against requirements for 1,000,000 cords (3,600,000 m^{3}). This did address the main bottleneck in local coal production, the shortage of wooden pit props. By the end of 1945, 63,400 cords (230,000 m^{3}) of pit props had been produced.

== Outcome ==
The decision to continue the pursuit of the retreating German army beyond the Seine strained the American logistical system to its limits, and until the port of Antwerp was opened on 28 November 1944 no permanent logistical structure could be established. Priority was given to the immediate needs of the operational units, first fuel and then ammunition, sometimes at the expense of items needed in the longer term, such as winter clothing and spare parts. The logistical system faltered, adversely impacting combat operations, but it did not collapse. Innovation at every level of command worked around the supply difficulties until the transportation issues were resolved. The US Army demonstrated its ability to learn from its own experiences and to adapt to changing circumstances. After the war an ETO board chaired by Lord concluded that many of the problems encountered during the Siegfried Line campaign in October and November could have been anticipated, and time was lost as increasingly higher echelons responded and developed solutions. By 1945, the logistical difficulties had been overcome, and supply losses in the fighting in the Ardennes, while severe, were soon made good.
