= General Busch =

General Busch may refer to:

- Andrew E. Busch (1970s–2010s), U.S. Air Force lieutenant general
- Ernst Busch (field marshal) (1885–1945), German Wehrmacht general
- Everett Busch (1893–1985), U.S. Army brigadier general
- Rolland Busch (1920–1985), Australian Defence Force major general
