= Reduction (military) =

A reduction, in military tactics, is accomplished when an encircling force conducts successful offensive operations over an invested force. The "reduction" refers to the shrinking in size of the pocket of territory occupied by the invested force, which would appear to be reduced as seen from a map. It is one of the four possible outcomes of investment, the others being relief, surrender or a breakout.

The general objective of encirclement maneuvers is to cause an enemy surrender or a reduction of the enemy force. It is generally preferred for an enemy to surrender, as it entails the least risk of casualties to the victorious party. There are, however, some exceptions. For example, British General Cameron Shute said during the Battle of the Somme:

I'm going to tell you this much, you know what you have got to do, the more prisoners you take, the less food you'll get, because we have to feed them out of your rations!

Nevertheless, the decision to reduce an encirclement may be made for a number of reasons:

- The encircled force cannot be expected to surrender under any realistic circumstances (the Münster Rebellion, the Waco Siege, the Battle of Masada).
- The encircling force has insufficient resources or supply lines to maintain a prolonged investment (the Battle of Moscow).
- Strategy dictates that the use of the encircling force as a pinning force for a prolonged period is untenable (numerous encirclements during and after Operation Barbarossa).
- Strategy dictates that objectives within the encirclement are too important to allow the enemy to possess for an extended period (the Siege of Jerusalem, the Battle of Stalingrad).
