= Penetration (warfare) =

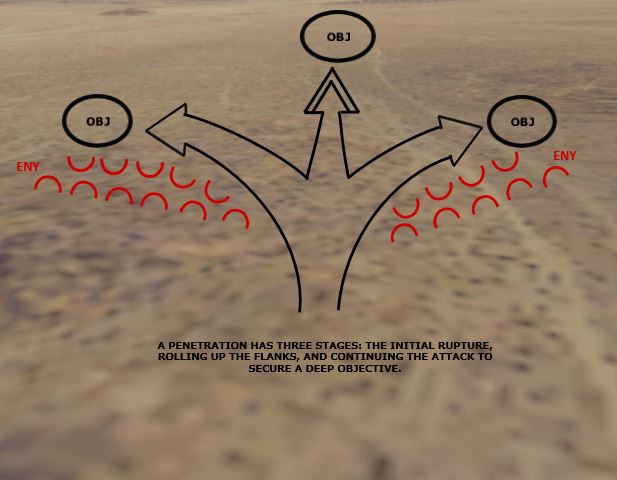
Diagram of the penetration maneuver. Figure 2-4 from Army Training Publication (ATP) 3-21.8: Infantry Platoon and Squad.

In ground attack position, penetration is the breaching of, and moving past, a defensive military line.

Penetration is a strategic military maneuver much like the pincer movement with a few differences. The penetration attack goes straight through the enemy's lines and, once through, each flank turns and attacks the opponent's rear, similar to the blitzkrieg strategy.

A penetration is a form of maneuver in which an attacking force seeks to rupture enemy defenses on a narrow front to disrupt the defensive system. A commander employs a penetration when there is no assailable flank, enemy defenses are overextended and weak spots are detected in the enemy's positions, or time pressures do not permit envelopment.

The penetration is carried out as part of a frontal attack when there is no assailable flank available. It takes the form of assaulting the enemy positions, creating a rupture, widening of the gap and finally breakthrough. Separate forces are earmarked for the assault and break-out stages of penetration. Penetration has the stages of break in, dog fight and break-out. There are no clear-cut demarcations between these stages and these tend to overlap.

Flank attack and other forms of maneuver are preferred to the penetration or frontal attack.

== See also ==
- Breakthrough (military)
- Breakout (military)
- List of established military terms
- List of military tactics
