= Breakthrough (military) =

Military tactic of exploiting a defense failure

A breakthrough occurs when an offensive force has broken or penetrated an opponent's defensive line, and rapidly exploits the gap.

Usually, large force is employed on a relatively small portion of the front to achieve this. While the line may have held for a long while prior to the breakthrough, the breakthrough happens suddenly when the pressure on the defender causes him to "snap".

As the first defensive unit breaks, the adjacent units suffer adverse results from this (spreading panic, additional defensive angles, threat to supply lines). Since they were already pressured, this leads them to "snap" as well, causing a domino-like collapse of the defensive system. The defensive force thus evaporates at the breakthrough point, letting the attacker to rapidly move troops into the gap, exploiting the breakthrough in width (by attacking enemy units at the edge of the breakthrough, so widening it), in depth (advancing into enemy territory towards strategic objectives), or a combination of both.

== Terminology ==
The OED records "break through" used in a military sense from the trench warfare times of 1915, when the Observer used the phrase in a headline. The Online Etymology Dictionary dates the metaphoric use of "breakthrough" - meaning "abrupt solution or progress" - from the 1930s, shortly after Joseph Stalin popularized the Russian equivalent (Russian: перелом, romanized: perelom) in a pep-piece on the "Great Breakthrough" published in November 1929, dense with military jargon and encouraging industrialization during the Soviet Union's first Five-Year Plan.

== See also ==
- Penetration (warfare)
- Breakout (military)

== Sources ==
- Carl von Clausewitz, On War
- Heinz Guderian, Achtung, Panzer!
