= Relief (military) =

Breaking of a siege or encirclement by an outside force

Relief, as a military term, refers to the breaking of a siege or an encirclement by an outside force. It may occur in conjunction with a breakout and is one of four possible conclusions of investment, the others being a breakout, surrender or reduction. The force that effects relief is known as the "relieving force" or colloquially "rescue party". Following relief, the town or fortification is said to have been "relieved".

== Notable relief forces ==
- Immortal 32 (Siege of the Alamo)
- Randy Shughart / Gary Gordon (Battle of Mogadishu)

== See also ==
- Combat search and rescue
- Relief in place
