= Everett Busch =

American general (1893-1985)

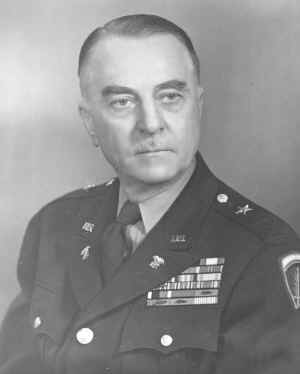
- Born: 14 March 1893; Sardis, Ohio, US
- Died: 31 March 1985 (aged 92); Fort Ord, California, US
- Burial place: Arlington National Cemetery
- Children: 1
- Military career
- Allegiance: United States
- Branch: United States Army
- Service years: 1917–1952
- Rank: Brigadier General
- Service number: 0-7260
- Unit: Quartermaster Corps
- Commands: Quartermaster Center and School
- Conflicts: World War I; World War II; Northern France Campaign; Rhineland Campaign; Ardennes-Alsace Campaign; Central Europe Campaign
- Awards: Army Distinguished Service Medal; Legion of Merit; Bronze Star Medal; Army Commendation Medal; Order of Leopold (with Palm) (Belgium); Croix de Guerre (with Palm) (France); Legion of Honor (France); War Cross (Czechoslovakia)

Everett Busch (14 March 1893 – 31 March 1985) was a United States Army general who served in World War I and World War II. During World War II he was the quartermaster of General George S. Patton's Third United States Army. After the war he served as the commandant of the Quartermaster Center and School.

== Biography ==
Everett Busch was born in Sardis, Ohio, on 14 March 1893. A graduate the University of West Virginia, he joined the United States Army in 1917, and served as an infantry and field artillery officer during World War I.

Busch transferred to the Quartermaster Corps in 1937. He attended the Quartermaster School, and then became the Post Quartermaster at the Letterman General Hospital at the Presidio of San Francisco. During World War II he became the quartermaster of the III Corps in January 1942, and the Third Army in February 1943. He served in the campaigns in Europe under General George S. Patton's Third United States Army. His skill as an innovative quartermaster was on display when he ensured that every soldier in the Third Army received a turkey dinner for Christmas in 1944, despite the Third Army being heavily engaged in the Battle of the Bulge.

After the war he served as the commander of the General Depot in Seattle, the Assistant Chief of the Memorial Division in the Office of the Quartermaster General in Washington, DC, the Deputy Chief of the Quartermaster Division of the United States Army Europe in Heidelberg, Germany. From September 1951 to September 1952 he was the Commandant of the Quartermaster School.

For his services as quartermaster of the Third Army, he was awarded the Army Distinguished Service Medal Other awards he received included the Legion of Merit, Bronze Star Medal, the Army Commendation Medal, the Belgian Order of Leopold (with Palm), the French Croix de Guerre (with Palm), the French Legion of Honor and Czechoslovak War Cross. He was elected to the Quartermaster Hall of Fame in 1994.

He died in the army hospital at Fort Ord, California, on 31 March 1985, and was buried in Arlington National Cemetery. His wife Margaret had died before him on 7 October 1973; they had one child, a daughter.
