= Living building material =

Construction material

A living building material (LBM) is a material used in construction or industrial design that behaves in a way resembling a living organism. Examples include: self-mending biocement, self-replicating concrete replacement, and mycelium-based composites for construction and packaging. Artistic projects include building components and household items.

== History ==
The development of living building materials began with research of methods for mineralizing concrete, that were inspired by coral mineralization. The use of microbiologically induced calcite precipitation (MICP) in concrete was pioneered by Adolphe et al. in 1990, as a method of applying a protective coating to building façades.

In 2007, "Greensulate", a mycelium-based building insulation material was introduced by Ecovative Design, a spin off of research conducted at the Rensselaer Polytechnic Institute. Mycelium composites were later developed for packaging, sound absorption, and structural building materials such as bricks.

In the United Kingdom, the Materials for Life (M4L) project was founded at Cardiff University in 2013 to "create a built environment and infrastructure which is a sustainable and resilient system comprising materials and structures that continually monitor, regulate, adapt and repair themselves without the need for external intervention". M4L led to the UK's first self-healing concrete trials. In 2017 the project expanded into a consortium led by the universities of Cardiff, Cambridge, Bath and Bradford, changing its name to Resilient Materials 4 Life (RM4L) and receiving funding from the Engineering and Physical Sciences Research Council. This consortium focuses on four aspects of material engineering: self-healing of cracks at multiple scales; self-healing of time-dependent and cycling loading damage; self-diagnosis and healing of chemical damage; and self-diagnosis and immunization against physical damage.

In 2016 the United States Department of Defense's Defense Advanced Research Projects Agency (DARPA) launched the Engineered Living Materials (ELM) program. The goal of this program is to "develop design tools and methods that enable the engineering of structural features into cellular systems that function as living materials, thereby opening up a new design space for building technology... [and] to validate these new methods through the production of living materials that can reproduce, self-organize, and self-heal." In 2017 the ELM program contracted Ecovative Design to produce "a living hybrid composite building material... [to] genetically re-program that living material with responsive functionality [such as] wound repair... [and to] rapidly reuse and redeploy [the] material into new shapes, forms, and applications." In 2020 a research group at the University of Colorado, funded by an ELM grant, published a paper after successfully creating exponentially regenerating concrete.

== Self-replicating concrete ==
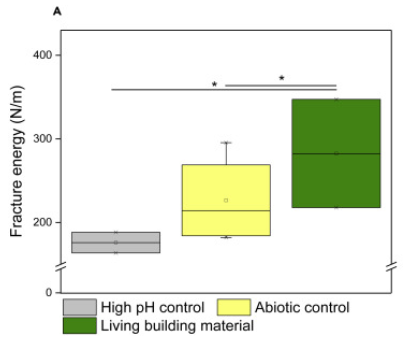
The fracture energy of a living building material compared with two controls: one with no cyanobacteria, and one with no cyanobacteria and a high pH.

Self-replicating concrete is produced using a mixture of sand and hydrogel, which are used as a growth medium for synechococcus bacteria to grow on.

=== Synthesis and fabrication ===
The sand-hydrogel mixture from which self-replicating concrete is made has a lower pH, lower ionic strength, and lower curing temperatures than a typical concrete mix, allowing it to serve as a growth medium for the bacteria. As the bacteria reproduce they spread through the medium, and biomineralize it with calcium carbonate, which is the main contributor to the overall strength and durability of the material. After mineralization the sand-hydrogel compound is strong enough to be used in construction, as concrete or mortar.

The bacteria in self-replicating concrete react to humidity changes: they are most active - and reproduce the fastest - in an environment with 100% humidity, though a drop to 50% does not have a large impact on the cellular activity. Lower humidity does result in a stronger material than high humidity.

As the bacteria reproduce, their biomineralization activity increases; this allows production capacity to scale exponentially.

=== Properties ===
The structural properties of this material are similar to those of Portland cement-based mortars: it has an elastic modulus of 293.9 MPa, and a tensile strength of 3.6 MPa (the minimum required value for Portland-cement based concrete is approximately 3.5 MPa); however it has a fracture energy of 170 N, which is much less than most standard concrete formulations, which can reach up to several kN.

=== Uses ===
Self-replicating concrete can be used in a variety of applications and environments, but the effect of humidity on the properties of the end material (see above) means that the application of the material must be tailored to its environment. In humid environments the material can be used as to fill cracks in roads, walls and sidewalks, sipping into cavities and growing into a solid mass as it sets; while in drier environments it can be used structurally, due to its increased strength in low-humidity environments.

Unlike traditional concrete, the production of which releases massive amounts of carbon dioxide to the atmosphere, the bacteria used in self-replicating concrete absorb carbon dioxide, resulting in a lower carbon footprint.

This self-replicating concrete is not meant to replace standard concrete, but to create a new class of materials, with a mixture of strength, ecological benefits, and biological functionality.

== Calcium carbonate biocement ==
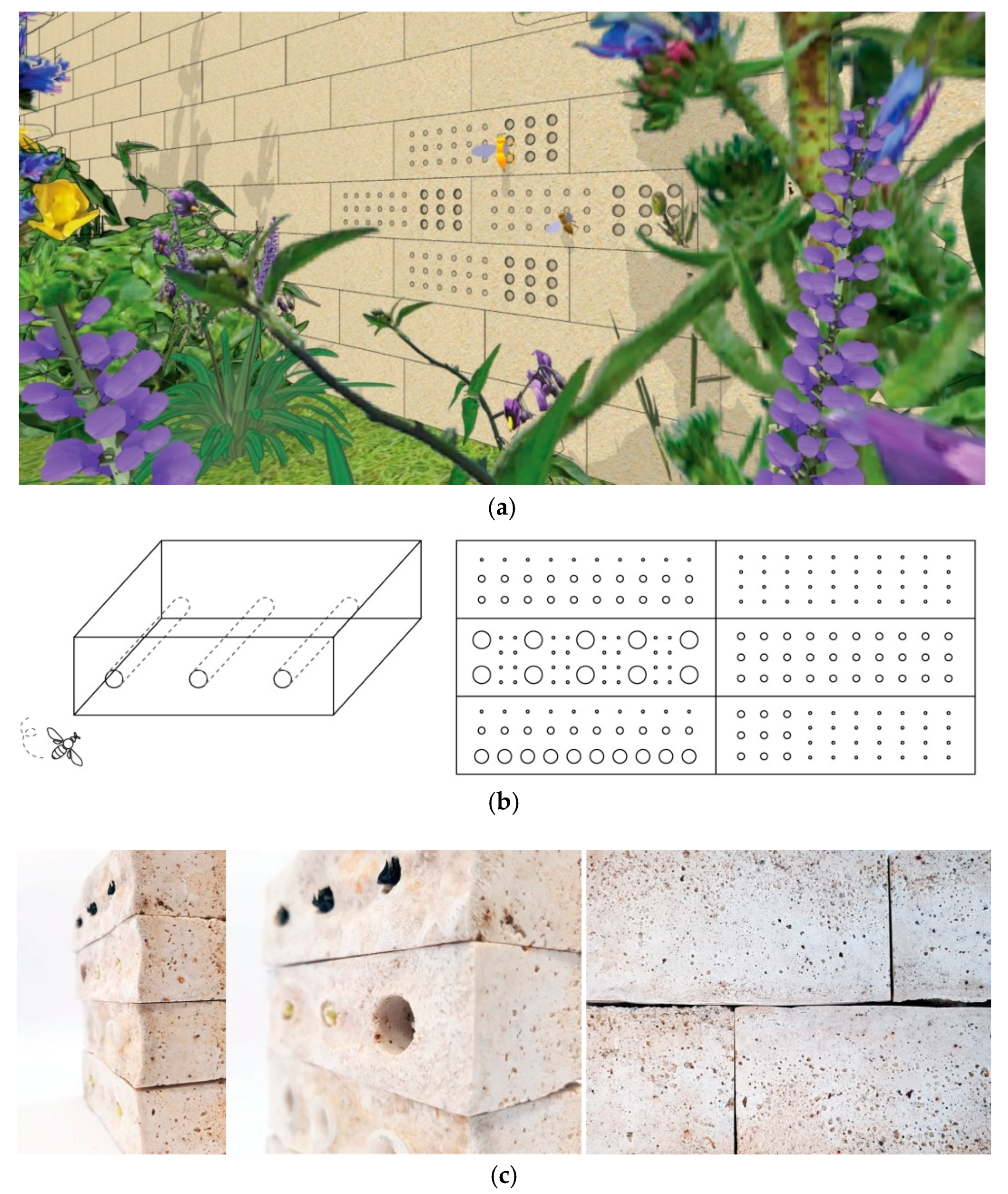
Biocement application in bee nesting. Figure (a) shows a virtual diagram of the biocement brick and housing area for bees. Figure (b) shows the cross section of the design and the holes the bees can nest in. Figure (c) shows the prototype of the bee block made of biocement.

Biocement is a sand aggregate material produced through the process of microbiologically induced calcite precipitation (MICP). It is an environmentally friendly material which can be produced using a variety of stocks, from agricultural waste to mine tailings.

=== Synthesis and fabrication ===
Microscopic organisms are the key component in the formation of bioconcrete, as they provide the nucleation site for CaCO_{3} to precipitate on the surface. Microorganisms such as Sporosarcina pasteurii are useful in this process, as they create highly alkaline environments where dissolved inorganic carbon (DIC) is present at high amounts. These factors are essential for microbiologically induced calcite precipitation (MICP), which is the main mechanism in which bioconcrete is formed. Other organisms that can be used to induce this process include photosynthesizing microorganisms such as microalgae, cyanobacteria, and sulphate reducing bacteria (SRB) such as Desulfovibrio desulfuricans.

Calcium carbonate nucleation depends on four major factors:

1. Calcium concentration
2. DIC concentration
3. pH levels
4. Availability of nucleation sites

As long as calcium ion concentrations are high enough, microorganisms can create such an environment through processes such as ureolysis.

Advancements in optimizing methods to use microorganisms to facilitate carbonate precipitation are rapidly developing.

=== Properties ===
Biocement is able to "self-heal" due to bacteria, calcium lactate, nitrogen, and phosphorus components that are mixed into the material. These components have the ability to remain active in biocement for up to 200 years. Biocement like any other concrete can crack due to external forces and stresses. Unlike normal concrete however, the microorganisms in biocement can germinate when introduced to water. Rain can supply this water which is an environment that biocement would find itself in. Once introduced to water, the bacteria will activate and feed on the calcium lactate that was part of the mixture. This feeding process also consumes oxygen which converts the originally water-soluble calcium lactate into insoluble limestone. This limestone then solidifies on surface it is lying on, which in this case is the cracked area, thereby sealing the crack up.

Oxygen is one of the main elements that cause corrosion in materials such as metals. When biocement is used in steel reinforced concrete structures, the microorganisms consume the oxygen thereby increasing corrosion resistance. This property also allows for water resistance as it actually induces healing, and reducing overall corrosion. Water concrete aggregates are what are used to prevent corrosion and these also have the ability to be recycled. There are different methods to form these such as through crushing or grinding of the biocement.

The permeability of biocement is also higher compared to normal cement. This is due to the higher porosity of biocement. Higher porosity can lead to larger crack propagation when exposed to strong enough forces. Biocement is now roughly 20% composed of a self healing agent. This decreases its mechanical strength. The mechanical strength of bioconcrete is about 25% weaker than normal concrete, making its compressive strength lower. Organisms such as Pesudomonas aeruginosa are effective in creating biocement. These are unsafe to be near humans so these must be avoided.

=== Nucleation Mechanisms ===
Heterogeneous nucleation on microbial cell surfaces is common in MICP. Bacterial cell walls and extracellular polymers present negatively charged sites that selectively bind Ca^{2+} ions, effectively lowering the nucleation energy barrier. In essence, each bound cation–carbonate encounter forms a tiny crystalline embryo. Thus, microbes provide numerous nucleation templates, yielding calcite platelets or needles rather than uniform glassy films. For example, SEM studies show that calcite often precipitates as clustered platelets or needle-like aggregates on bacterial films. At high local supersaturation, unstable precursors like Amorphous calcium carbonate and Vaterite can initially form and later transform into calcite. In microbial consortia or in seawater, mixed metabolic pathways further modulate local pH and ion activities, affecting nucleation thresholds. These include the hydrolysis of urea or Photosynthesis.

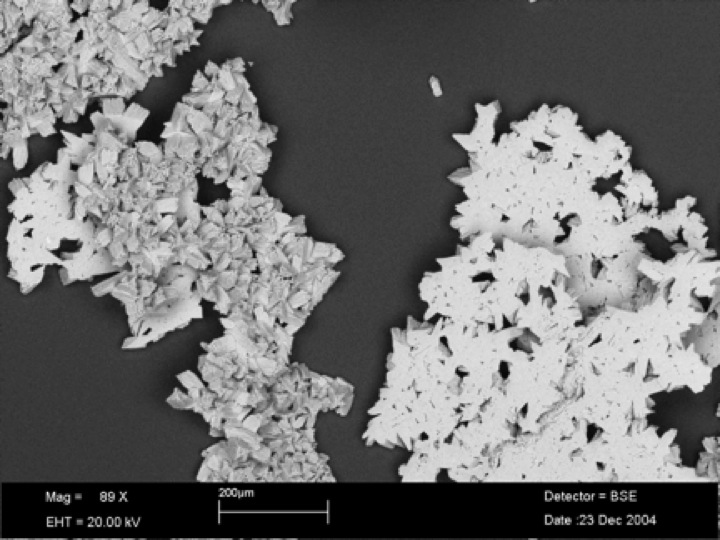
Scanning electron micrograph showing clusters of calcium carbonate crystals formed via microbially induced calcite precipitation (MICP). The crystalline aggregates exhibit faceted morphologies consistent with diffusion-limited growth under moderate supersaturation. Large-scale precipitation patterns like this are influenced by ionic transport through porous media and localized nucleation around microbial cells.

Microscopy of microbially induced calcite often shows characteristic morphologies. Bacterial surfaces and exopolymeric sheaths concentrate Ca^{2+} and CO_{3}^{2-} ions and act as charged nucleation sites. The result is often aggregated "rafts" or needle-like clusters of calcite as shown in the image rather than smooth single crystals. Such textures are consistent with heterogeneous nucleation: crystals grow epitaxially on cell templates that locally elevate supersaturation. When supersaturation is relieved by rapid precipitation, calcium ions diffuse in from surrounding fluid, sustaining continued nucleation and growth around the microbe.

Extracellular polymeric substances (EPS) secreted by bacteria also play a crucial role in CaCO_{3} nucleation. EPS are complex biopolymers composed of polysaccharides, proteins, and nucleic acids that form a hydrated matrix around microbial colonies. These matrices can bind divalent cations such as Ca^{2+} and localize carbonate ions, thereby increasing ion activity at the cell-fluid interface. EPS mediates heterogeneous nucleation by concentrating reactants and lowering the interfacial energy barrier for crystal formation. Additionally, specific functional groups in the EPS such as carboxyl and hydroxyl moieties can template crystal orientation or polymorph selection. This microenvironmental control over supersaturation and binding energy is a fundamental example of biologically controlled mineralization.

=== Growth Kinetics ===
Once nucleated, calcite crystals grow by incorporating ions at their surfaces. Two limiting regimes are often distinguished in materials science: spiral growth fed by dislocation sources and two-dimensional (2D) layer nucleation on crystal terraces. Kinetic studies show that crystal size and ion transport determine which mechanism dominates. For instance, it has been found that calcite crystals larger than roughly 1 μm preferentially grow by spiral steps, while smaller crystallites rely more on surface 2D nucleation. This size dependence arises because ion transport through the fluid boundary layer is finite: slow diffusion at larger sizes lowers the effective supersaturation at the crystal face, favoring steady spiral growth.

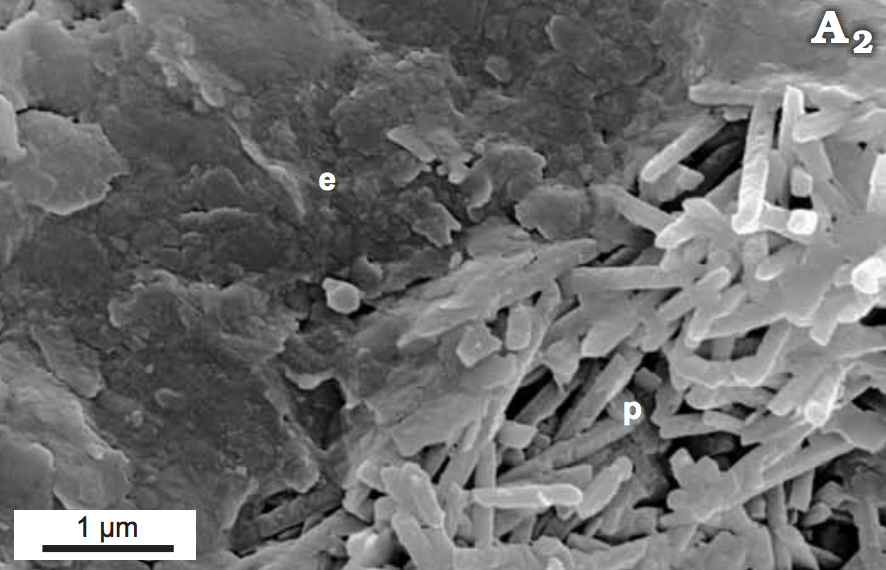
High-magnification SEM image of microbially induced calcium carbonate precipitation. Rod-shaped calcite crystals (p) are seen growing on an extracellular matrix (e), likely composed of bacterial biofilm or organic substrates. This interface highlights heterogeneous nucleation on biological surfaces, where bacterial exopolymers facilitate local supersaturation and directional crystal growth.

Diffusion of ions to the growth front is described by Fick's laws. A simplification is Fick's first law, $J=-D \frac{dC}{dx}$, which states that the diffusive flux J (in mol·m^{−2}·s^{−1}) is proportional to the concentration gradient of the ion by the proportionality factor of diffusivity D. In MICP, bacterial ureolysis or photosynthesis creates high [Ca^{2+}] and [HCO_{3}^{-}] zones. As calcite precipitates, local depletion zones form and ions diffuse in to replenish them. When precipitation is very fast due to high enzyme activity or high supersaturation, diffusion can become rate-limiting: growth slows as D and the concentration gradient define the flux. Conversely, at lower supersaturation or with plentiful mixing, surface reaction steps involving attachment kinetics may control growth rates.

At the microscale, crystal growth morphologies reflect these kinetics. In the SEM image shown, calcite crystals show elongated needle-like features, indicative of stepwise layer growth. Experimental kinetics reveal that, beyond a critical size, continued supply of ions by diffusion supports a steady spiral growth front. In contrast, sub-micron calcite particles may grow by frequent nucleation of new layers across the face. It has been found that the overall calcite growth can be modeled as a combination of spiral growth and new-layer nucleation.

=== Phase Transformations ===
Calcium carbonate has multiple crystal polymorphs and amorphous precursors. In MICP, the most stable end product is usually calcite with rhombohedral crystal, but metastable forms appear transiently. Initially, a hydrated amorphous CaCO_{3} (ACC) phase or transient vaterite may form. ACC is highly soluble and will rapidly recrystallize. Classic Ostwald's rule of stages applies: the system often precipitates the least stable form first and then transforms to more stable polymorphs. For example, under many conditions ACC precipitates first, then crystallizes into vaterite, and finally reorders into calcite. In microbial settings, organic molecules such as proteins or polysaccharides and solution chemistry involving Mg^{2+}, phosphate, etc. can stabilize vaterite or even aragonite. However, in neutral pH soils the dominant phase transformation is usually vaterite-to-calcite.

The availability of nucleation templates also influences polymorphism. Bacteria and algae can selectively induce aragonite or calcite by producing specific organic matrices. In laboratory MICP studies, adding magnesium or certain biopolymers tends to favor aragonite or inhibit calcite nucleation. Conversely, in many ureolytic MICP experiments calcite is observed as sharp-edged rhombs since Ca^{2+} binds more strongly to cell surfaces than Mg^{2+}. In all cases, the multistep crystallization path (ACC → vaterite → calcite) is governed by the interplay of kinetics and thermodynamics, where higher supersaturation and rapid urea hydrolysis often push the system through these transformations quickly.

=== Uses ===
Biocement is currently used in applications such as in sidewalks and pavements in buildings. There are ideas of biological building constructions as well. The uses of biocement are still not widespread because there is currently not a feasible method of mass-producing biocement to such a high extent. There is also much more definitive testing that needs to be done to confidently use biocement in such large scale applications where mechanical strength can not be compromised. The cost of biocement is also twice as much as normal concrete. Different uses in smaller applications however include spray bars, hoses, drop lines, and bee nesting. Biocement is still in its developmental stages however its potential proves promising for its future uses.

== Mycelium composites ==
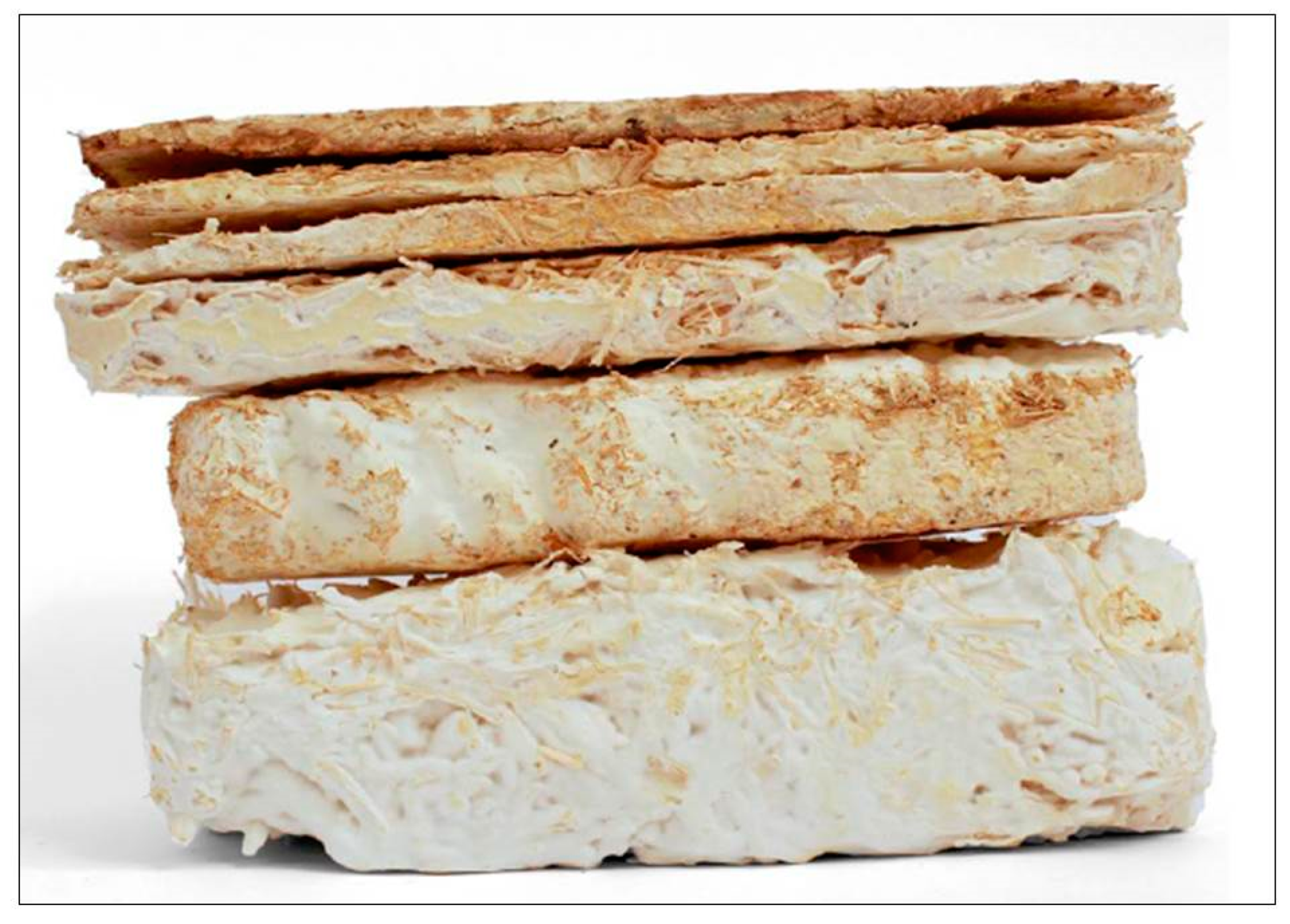
One of the examples of the structure of a mycelium based composite.

Mycelium composites are materials that are based on mycelium – the mass of branching, thread-like hyphae produced by fungi. There are several ways to synthesize and fabricate mycelium composites, leading to different properties and uses for the finished product. Mycelium composites are economical and sustainable.

=== Synthesis and fabrication ===
Mycelium-based composites are usually synthesised by using different kinds of fungi, especially mushrooms. An individual microbe of fungi is introduced to different types of organic substances to form a composite. The selection of fungal species is important for creating a product with specific properties. Some of the fungal species that are used to make composites are G. lucidum, Ganoderma sp. P. ostretus, Pleurotus sp., T. versicolor, Trametes sp., etc. A dense network is formed when the mycelium of the microbe of fungi degrades and colonises the organic substance. Plant waste is a common organic substrate that is used in mycelium-based composites. Fungal mycelium is incubated with a plant waste product to produce sustainable alternatives mostly for petroleum-based materials. The mycelium and organic substrate need time to incubate properly and this time is crucial as it is the period that these particles interact together and bind to form a dense network and hence form a composite. During this incubation period, mycelium uses essential nutrients such as carbon, minerals, and water from the waste plant product. Some of the organic substrate components include cotton, wheat grains, rice husks, sorghum fibres, agricultural waste, sawdust, bread particles, banana peel, coffee residue, etc. The composites are synthesised and fabricated using different techniques such as adding carbohydrates, altering fermentation conditions, using different fabrication technology, altering post-processing stages, and modifying genetics or biochemicals to form products with certain properties. Fabrication of most of the mycelium composites are by using plastic molds, so the mycelium can be grown directly into the desired shape. Other fabrication methods include laminate skin mold, vacuum skin mold, glass mold, plywood mold, wooden mold, petri dish mold, tile mold, etc. During fabrication process, it is essential to have a sterilised environment, a controlled environment condition of light, temperature (25-35 °C) and humidity around 60-65% for the best results. One way to synthesise a mycelium based composite is by mixing different composition ratios of fibers, water and mycelium together and putting in a PVC molds in layers while compressing each layer and letting it incubate for couple of days. Mycelium based composites can be processed in foam, laminate and mycelium sheet by using processing techniques such as later cutting, cold and heat compression, etc. Mycelium composites tend to absorb water when they are newly fabricated, therefore this property can be changed by drying the product.

=== Properties ===
One of the advantages about using mycelium based composites is that properties can be altered depending on fabrication process and the use of different fungus. Properties depend on type of fungus used and where they are grown. Additionally, fungi has an ability to degrade the cellulose component of the plant to make composites in a preferable manner. Some important mechanical properties such as compressive strength, morphology, tensile strength, hydrophobicity, and flexural strength can be modified as well for different use of the composite. To increase the tensile strength, the composite can go through heat pressing. The properties of a mycelium composite are affected by its substrate; for example, a mycelium composite made out of 75 wt% rice hulls has a density of 193 kg/m^{3}, while 75 wt% wheat grains has 359 kg/m^{3}. Another method to increase the density of the composite would be by deleting a hydrophobin gene. These composites also have the ability of self-fusion which increases their strength. Mycelium based composites are usually compact, porous, lightweight and a good insulator. The main property of these composites is that they are entirely natural, therefore sustainable. Another advantage of mycelium based composites is that this substance acts as an insulator, is fireproof, nontoxic, water-resistant, rapidly growing, and able to bond with neighboring mycelium products. Mycelium-based foams (MBFs) and sandwich components are two common types of composite. MBFs are the most efficient type because of their low density property, high quality, and sustainability. The density of MBFs can be decreased by using substrates that are smaller than 2 mm in diameter. These composites have higher thermal conductivity as well.

=== Uses ===
One of the most common use of mycelium based composites is for the alternatives for petroleum and polystyrene based materials. These synthetic foams are usually used for sustainable design and architecture products. The use of mycelium based composites are based on their properties. There are several bio-sustainable companies

== Further applications ==
Beyond the use of living building materials, the application of microbially induced calcium carbonate precipitation (MICP) has the possibility of helping remove pollutants from wastewater, soil, and the air. Currently, heavy metals and radionuclei provide a challenge to remove from water sources and soil. Radionuclei in ground water do not respond to traditional methods of pumping and treating the water, and for heavy metals contaminating soil, the methods of removal include phytoremediation and chemical leaching do work; however, these treatments are expensive, lack longevity in effectiveness, and can destroy the productivity of the soil for future uses. By using ureolytic bacteria that is capable of CaCO_{3} precipitation, the pollutants can move into the calc-be structure, thereby removing them from the soil or water. This works through substitution of calcium ions for pollutants that then form solid particles and can be removed. It's reported that 95% of these solid particles can be removed by using ureolytic bacteria. However, when calcium scaling in pipelines occurs, MICP cannot be used as it is calcium-based. Instead of calcium, it is possible to add a low concentration of urea to remove up to 90% of the calcium ions.

Another further application involves a self-constructed foundation that forms in response to pressure through the use of engineering bacteria. The engineered bacteria could be used to detect increased pressure in soil, and then cement the soil particles in place, effectively solidifying the soil. Within soil, pore pressure consists of two factors: the amount of applied stress, and how quickly water in the soil is able to drain. Through analyzing the biological behavior of the bacteria in response to a load and the mechanical behavior of the soil, a computational model can be created. With this model, certain genes within the bacteria can be identified and modified to respond a certain way to a certain pressure. However, the bacteria analyzed in this study was grown in a highly controlled lab, so real soil environments may not be as ideal. This is a limitation of the model and study it originated from, but it still remains a possible application of living building materials.
