= Self-healing concrete =

Materials science concept

Autogenous self-healing crack

Self-healing concrete is concrete able to fix its cracks on its own. It not only seals the cracks but also partially or entirely recovers the mechanical properties of the structural elements. This kind of concrete is also known as self-repairing concrete. Because concrete has a poor tensile strength compared to other building materials, it often develops cracks in the surface. These cracks reduce the durability of the concrete because they facilitate the flow of liquids and gases that may contain harmful compounds. If microcracks expand and reach the reinforcement, not only will the concrete itself be susceptible to attack, so will the reinforcement steel bars. Therefore, it is essential to limit the crack's width and repair it as quickly as feasible. Self-healing concrete would make the material more sustainable, and also contribute to an increase in the service life of concrete structures and make the material more durable and environmentally friendly.

Self-healing is an old and well-known phenomenon for concrete, given that it contains innate autogenous healing characteristics. Cracks may heal over time due to continued hydration of clinker minerals or carbonation of calcium hydroxide. Autogenous healing is difficult to control since it can only heal small cracks and is only effective when water is present. This limitation makes it tough to use. On the other hand, concrete may be altered to provide self-healing capabilities for cracks. There are many solutions for improving autogenous healing by adding the admixtures, such as mineral additions, crystalline admixtures, and superabsorbent polymers. Further, concrete can be modified to built-in autonomous self-healing techniques. The capsule-based self-healing, the vascular self-healing, and the microbiological self-healing are the most common types of autonomous self-healing techniques.

== History ==
The ancient Romans used a type of lime mortar that has been found to be self-healing. The stratlingite crystals form along the interfacial zones of Roman concrete, binding the aggregate and mortar together and this process continued even after 2000 years and it was discovered by the geologist Marie Jackson and her colleagues in 2014. In the early 1990s, Carolyn M. Dry created the first modern contemporary self-healing approach by developing a configuration that facilitates the release of repair chemicals from fibers embedded in a cementitious matrix. Since then, research community has developed various techniques to incorporate self-healing properties in the concrete. Among the other self-healing materials, in recent years, self-healing concrete research works are growing exponentially because of government-funded consortiums like SARCOS COST Action, RM4L, ReSHEALience, and SMARTINCS. The worldwide market for self-healing concrete is anticipated to grow at a CAGR of 36.8% during the forecast period, with revenue increasing from US$34.10 billion in 2021 to US$562.97 billion in 2030. Rising investment in large-scale infrastructure projects and rising collaboration among governments of different nations to engage in infrastructure projects for long-term goals are factors driving market expansion.

== Autogenous healing ==
Autogenous healing of cementitious materials influences crack self-closure and, subsequently, durability and physical-mechanical performance of composites. It is considered to be one of the main reasons for substantial life extension of ancient structures and buildings. Autogenous self-healing in cement-based composites was first noticed by the French Academy of Science in 1836, when cracks in pipes, water-retaining structures, etc., self-healed. Significant theoretical and experimental research in the 1900s demonstrated that autogenous self-healing processes are mostly linked to physical, mechanical, and chemical processes inside the cementitious matrix are shown in the scheme. During the so-called "surface-controlled crystal development" that occurs when cracking is induced, calcium ions are immediately accessible from the fracture faces, and crystal growth is accelerated. After an initial layer of calcite is formed on the crack walls and the surrounding concrete matrix becomes less rich in calcium ions, the transition to the so-called "diffusion-controlled crystal growth" occurs, which means that the Ca^{2+} ions must diffuse through the concrete, and the CaCO_{3} layer in order to reach the crack surface and ensure the precipitation of the healing products. Clearly, the second phase is much slower than the first. In the case of composite cement, including pozzolanic additions, a portion of the calcium hydroxide, which has been identified as a primary source of Ca^{2+} ions, is used in the particular pozzolanic reaction for CSH formation. This will result in a delayed and weaker precipitation of calcium carbonate. Other minor mechanisms depicted in the scheme include the swelling of hydrated cement paste along the crack walls due to water absorption by calcium silicate hydrates and mechanical crack blocking by means of debris and fine concrete particles, direct results of the cracking process or as a result of impurities in the water entering the crack. Autogenous healing mechanisms are only effective for small cracks, although there is a wide range of maximum widths for healable cracks: 10–100 μm, sometimes up to 200 μm but less than 300 μm, only in the presence of water. They are challenging to control and forecast because to their usually scattered outcomes and dependence on a number of factors and variables. 1) the age and composition of the concrete itself, 2) the presence of water, and 3) the thickness and form of the concrete fracture are the most influential elements.

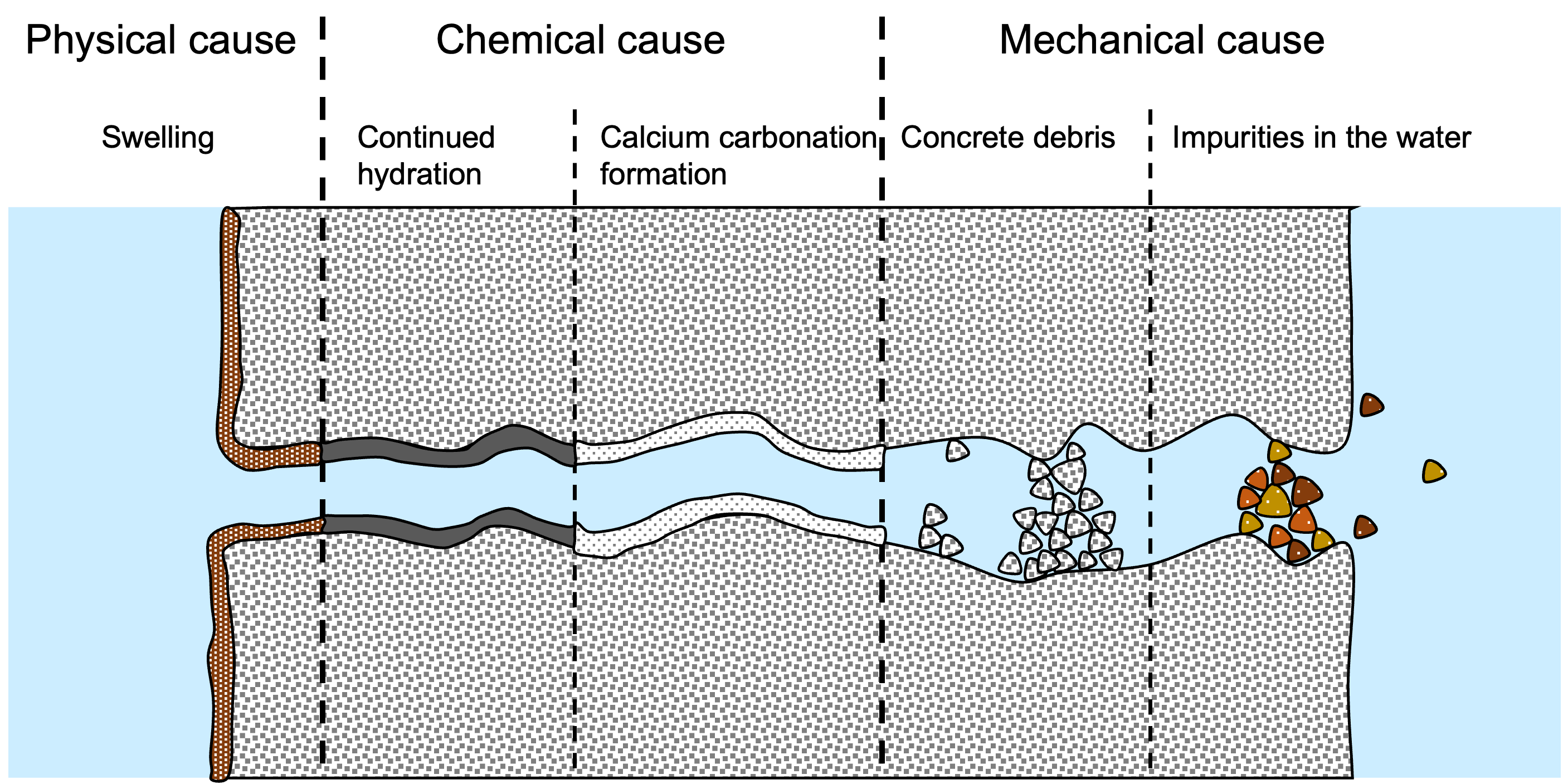
Autogenous self-healing mechanism

== Stimulated autogenous healing ==
When crack widths are constrained, autogenous healing is more successful. The presence of water is also a significant element. The stimulation of continuous hydration or crystallization promotes self-healing as well. Therefore, methods that restrict crack width, provide water, or boost hydration or crystallization will be categorized as promoting or enhancing autogenous healing.

=== Use of mineral additions ===
Most research on the effects of mineral addition on self-healing has been conducted on blast-furnace slag and fly ash. Continuous hydration promotes autogenous healing because major sections of these additions remain unhydrated even at older ages. The pozzolanic reaction, which is specific to siliceous and/or aluminous additions (fly ash, blast-furnace slag, silica fume, calcined clay, etc.) in composite cement, can strengthen the continuous hydration of cement grains in terms of long-term CSH development and, as a result, a certain degree of autogenous self-healing.

Expansive mineral additions, such as magnesium oxide-based agents, are evaluated within interlaboratory frameworks to assess crack sealing efficiency, where water flow testing demonstrates greater repeatability across laboratories compared to water absorption measurements.

=== Use of crystalline admixtures ===
The phrase "crystalline admixtures" is a label that does not necessarily indicate functionality or molecular structure since it is derived from commercially accessible goods whose components are often not specified. Practically, commercial crystalline admixtures may be distinguished from supplementary cementitious materials (SCMs) by their dosage, generally 1% by cement weight for crystalline admixtures and more than 5% for SCMs. Crystalline admixtures (CA) are categorized as a unique type of permeability-reducing admixtures. The category of permeability reducing admixtures includes a diverse variety of materials, which may also be referred to by the general term "crystalline admixtures." Furthermore, most commercial products include proprietary ingredients, and their formulations are kept secret. However, in general, CAs are extremely hydrophilic products created by "active chemicals" that are often blended with cement and sand. In the presence of water, they react, creating water-insoluble pore/crack-blocking precipitates that improve CSH density and resistance to water penetration. CAs have been demonstrated to enhance the mechanical qualities of concrete when used at 3%, 5%, and 7% of the cement content when exposed to moisture. However, the percentages mentioned above may be fairly high for an addition.

=== Use of superabsorbent polymers ===
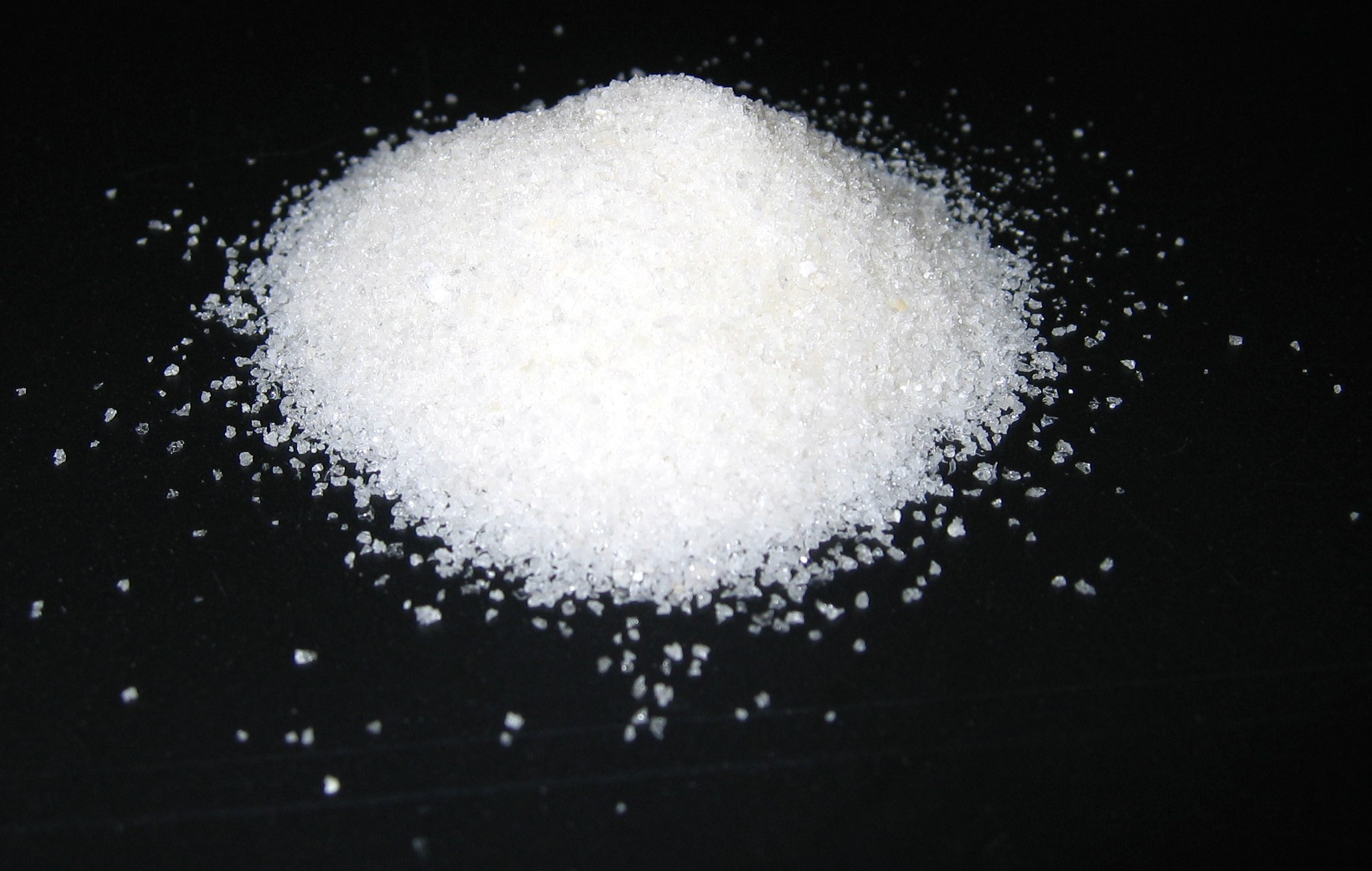
Superabsorbent polymer

Superabsorbent polymers are natural, or synthetic 3D cross-linked homopolymers or copolymers with a high fluid absorption capacity. The swelling capacity varies according to the monomers' type and the cross-linking density and may reach 1000 g g-1. The maximal swelling results from a balance between osmotic pressure, which is related to the presence of electrically charged groups, and the elastic retractive forces of the polymer matrix. Furthermore, since osmotic pressure is related to the concentration of ions in the aqueous solution, the ionic strength of the swollen medium substantially influences absorption behavior. Aside from the several application areas (e.g., sanitary and biomedical sector, agricultural sector) where SAPs are currently used, more and more research is focusing on the use of SAPs in mortar/concrete. To limit self-desiccation shrinkage during hardening, SAPs were added as an internal curing agent in cementitious systems with a low water-to-binder ratio. Aside from reducing autogenous shrinkage, SAPs may be added to cementitious materials to improve freeze-thaw resistance and induce self-sealing and self-healing properties. In terms of the latter, the inclusion of SAPs serves many purposes.

First and foremost, SAPs, which absorb mixing water during concrete mixing and shrink when the matrix hardens, leave behind macropores. These macropores operate as weak matrix sites, attracting and encouraging multiple cracking. Both actions promote crack closure by allowing cracks to cross SAP macropores and generate narrower cracks. However, these macropores may be accountable for strength loss, but not always, since SAPs can also operate as an internal healing agent and drive more hydration, as previously mentioned. It all relies on the kind of SAP utilized, particle size and shape, the number of SAPs, the w/c ratio of the mix, the addition of water to compensate for the loss in workability, and the mixing technique, among other things.

=== Additives that promote self-healing on heat exposure ===
Carbon nanotube reinforced concrete (CNT-RC) can heal after being subjected to fires and high temperatures. Research by Szeląg investigated the healing ability of CNT-RC after being subjected to high temperatures. The study found that the addition of CNTs to cement paste improved the thermal stability of the material and allowed for it to maintain its mechanical properties at elevated temperatures up to 800 °C. Additionally, after the material was exposed to high temperatures and subsequently cooled, it still maintained its healing ability and was able to repair any cracks that formed during the thermal loading process.

== Autonomous self-healing ==
Autonomous self-healing depends on integrating atypical engineering modifications in the matrix to give a self-healing function. Encapsulation has long been the favored method for delivering healing agents directly to the cracks, allowing in-place repair. In encapsulating healing compounds, there are two approaches: discrete and continuous. The key distinction is the mechanism utilized to store the healing agent, which determines the extent of damage that may be treated, the repeatability of healing, and the recovery rate for each strategy. However, several elements must be addressed in the design of an encapsulated-based self-healing system, from capsule system creation through integration, mechanical characterization, triggering, and healing assessment.

=== Microencapsulation ===
Microencapsulation (diameter < 1 mm) remains a popular technology for manufacturing autonomous self-healing components for cementitious systems, inspired by the pioneering study of White et al. Microcapsules were directly incorporated into the matrix and upon crack development, and releasing the core in the crack volume. The discharged substance would then react with a distributed catalyst in the matrix to heal the crack. On several occasions, the proof of concept for microcapsule-based healing in concrete has been proven. Recent capsule research has continued to emphasize the usage of adhesive two-component systems necessitating the simultaneous embedding of a catalyst into the matrix for activation and hardening. Wang et al. advised a ratio of 0.5 catalyst to microcapsules, although others have suggested a ratio of 1.3 catalyst to microcapsules to guarantee activation of the encapsulated epoxy. However, the long-term stability of reacted organic healing agents in the extremely alkaline cementitious matrix and their long-term functioning remain uncertain. Emerging research, however, promotes compatibility and bonding with the mineral substrate of the cementitious matrix, moving toward a capsule that may provide such healing products; these include encapsulated bacterial spores and mineral cargos such as colloidal silica and sodium silicate. The former may increase carbonate precipitation, while the latter can convert calcium hydroxide to a more desirable CSH gel.

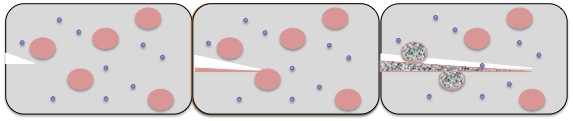
Microcapsules self-healing technique

=== Macroencapsulation ===
Dry conducted one of the early researches using macroencapsulation, proposing polypropylene and glass fibers with a mono- or multicomponent methyl methacrylate core for healing concrete cracks. The selection of the fibers was prompted by the combination of mechanical strengthening, crack sealing, and a cost-effective encapsulating technique. Moreover, this method was favored over implanted microcapsules because it gave the benefit of retaining a higher quantity of the healing agent and the possibility of many healings. The ultimate objective was to avoid adhesive breakdown over time. The release of the healing agent was triggered by the creation of cracks, which led to the destruction of the implanted brittle fibers.

Lower processing temperatures and the ability to integrate extrusion, filling, and sealing stages make polymeric capsules potentially simpler to manufacture. In the case of cylindrical capsules, the diameters range from 0.8 to 5 mm so that the attractive capillary force of the crack and the gravitational force on the fluid mass is sufficient to overcome the capillary resistive force of the cylindrical capsules and the negative pressure forces resulting from the sealed ends. In other words, the crack width of the matrix should be less than the capsules' inner diameter.

=== Vascular healing ===
The concept of vascular healing in concrete utilizes a biomimetic approach to self-healing. The human cardiovascular system, which conducts blood throughout the body, and the plant vascular tissue system, which transports food, water, and minerals via xylem and phloem networks, are examples of vascular network systems. Similarly, vascular networks in concrete may transport liquid healing chemicals to damaged areas. Theoretically, there is no limit to the quantity of damaged material that may be fixed when this healing substance is provided from an external source. Early work by Dry included embedding long, thin glass channels in concrete. This self-healing mechanism was eventually scaled up and used on a sample bridge deck. The difficulty of casting concrete with these very fragile materials was one obstacle preventing this technique's widespread use.

The significant advantage of the vascular technique over the encapsulation method is that the healing agent may be administered continuously. Indeed, different healing agents may be used at different periods to heal different kinds of concrete damage. Additionally, the healing agent may be delivered under pressure to guarantee that it reaches the desired damage zones, similar to the notion of injecting epoxy for fixing concrete fractures. In concrete, several types of vascular networks have been implemented. The simplest version consists of a 1D channel, both ends of which are accessible from the concrete surface. Complex two- and three-dimensional channel networks have been developed in concrete to give various and alternative routes for the transfer of healing agents to damaged areas. Using multiflow junction nodes inside the network, these complex shapes also have been utilized.

=== Self-healing bioconcrete ===
The formation of calcium carbonate as a byproduct of microbial activity is an additional method for "engineering" the self-healing ability of concrete. It holds the potential for active and long-lasting crack repair while also being a potentially ecologically beneficial technique. Calcium carbonate (CaCO_{3}), often known as limestone, has an effective bonding capability and is compatible with current concrete formulations. As a result of the carbonation of existing calcium hydroxide (portlandite) minerals, calcium carbonate may be included in the concrete mix design or chemically created inside the concrete matrix. Limestone generated inside the matrix of concrete may result in the densification of the matrix by pore filling and can help to self-heal crack, reducing its (water) permeability and resulting in the recovery of lost strength. If circumstances are favorable, most bacteria can precipitate CaCO_{3} from the solution. However, the carbonatogenesity of bacteria following distinct metabolic routes for the precipitation of bacterial CaCO_{3} varies. Additionally, many extrinsic variables influence the precipitation efficiency and cause the same bacterial strain to produce varying amounts of carbonate. It is probable that in a wet-dry environment, healing happens more quickly. In addition, the regulation of crack width is crucial for achieving quicker and more effective healing through biological activity.

== Mathematical modelling on healing agent dosage or crack-healing efficiency ==
Most previous studies have relied on experimental methods to evaluate crack-healing efficiency. For example, optical and electron microscopy have been employed to visualize healing behavior in cracks, while mechanical strength tests and permeability measurements are commonly used to assess the associated improvements in macroscopic material properties. Inspired by Buffon's needle problem, geometrical probability theory has also been applied to develop mathematical models for predicting the required dosage of healing capsules under various crack patterns ( including continuous and discrete crack networks). Given a fixed effective capsule dosage, these models can further serve to estimate healing efficiency. In cases where the dosage of anhydrous cement particles is known, both dome-like and splitting crack modelscan be utilized to predict healing performance via the rehydration of these particles.

== See also ==
- Living building material – Construction material
- Self-healing material – Substances that can repair themselves
- Smart material – Material that can be externally controlled
