= Sustainable habitat =

A sustainable habitat is an ecosystem that produces food and shelter for people and other organisms without resource depletion and in such a way that no external waste is produced. Thus the habitat can continue into the future without external infusions of resources. Such a sustainable habitat may evolve naturally or be produced by design. A sustainable habitat that is created and designed by human intelligence will mimic nature, if it is to be successful. Everything within it is connected to a complex array of organisms, physical resources, and functions. Organisms from many different biomes can be brought together to fulfill various ecological niches.

== Definition ==
Sustainable 3D-printed house - Tecla

A sustainable habitat is achieving stability between the economic and social development of human habitats together with the defense of the environment, shelter, basic services, social infrastructure, and transportation.

A sustainable habitat is required to make sure that one species' waste ends up being the energy or food source for another species. It involves the preservation of the ecological balance in terms of a symbiotic perspective on urban development while developing urban extensions of existing towns.

The term often refers to sustainable human habitats, which typically involves some form of green building or environmental planning.

== History ==
In creating the sustainable habitats, environmental scientists, designers, engineers and architects must not consider any elements as a waste product to be disposed of somewhere off site, but as a nutrient stream for another process to feed on. Researching ways to interconnect waste streams to production creates a more sustainable society by minimizing pollution.

Sustainability of marine ecosystems is a concern. Rigorous fishing has decreased top trophic levels and affected the ecological dynamics and resilience of fisheries by reducing the numbers and lengths of food webs. Historically intense commercial and rising recreational fishing pressures have resulted in "unsustainable rates of exploitation for 70% of the snapper-grouper complex, which consists of over 50 species, mainly of groupers and snappers" in Florida and the Florida Keys. The systematic and widespread conversion of estuarine habitats into agricultural, industrial, and urban uses has demonstrated a historical devotion to valuing the use of land for purposes from a position of simple but defective logic. Unused land provides no products, which is useless land.

The ecosystem services approach fills gaps in a sustainability analysis by demanding the account for the linkages between ecosystem goods and services, and ecosystem processes and human wellbeing.

The World Commission on Environment and Development states that "sustaining oceans are marked by a fundamental unity." Interconnected cycles of energy, climate, marine living resources, and human activities move through coastal waters, regional seas, and the closed oceans. Global pressures on the ocean include rising levels of greenhouse gas emissions, which impact species and food webs throughout ocean ecosystems, deoxygenation, overfishing, and run-off pollution from land and coastal sources.

Transformation to a thriving ocean system requires changes in governance across sectors and scales. "The end result would be a form of polycentric governance that can manage shared resources and ocean space." A polycentric governance goal from The World Commission on Environment and Development is "to support multiple governing bodies by establishing a shared vision and creating principled guiding frameworks and processes to facilitate coherent systems-oriented regulation."

== Types of sustainable habitats ==
=== Coral reefs ===
Coral Outcrop Flynn Reef

A coral reef is an underwater ecosystem characterized by reef-building corals. Coral reefs serve as a habitat for a diverse range of fish and invertebrates, while also providing economic resources to fishing communities.

The coral reefs' foundation is made up of stony corals with calcareous skeletons that protect shores from storm surges. They also help produce sand for recreational beaches and aquariums.

Coral reefs are a largely self-sustaining ecosystem and up to 90% of the corals' nutrients may come from their symbiotic relationships. The coral polyps and microscopic algae zooxanthellae in coral reefs have a symbiotic relationship wherein the algae provide nourishment to the coral polyps from within their tissue.

=== Parks ===
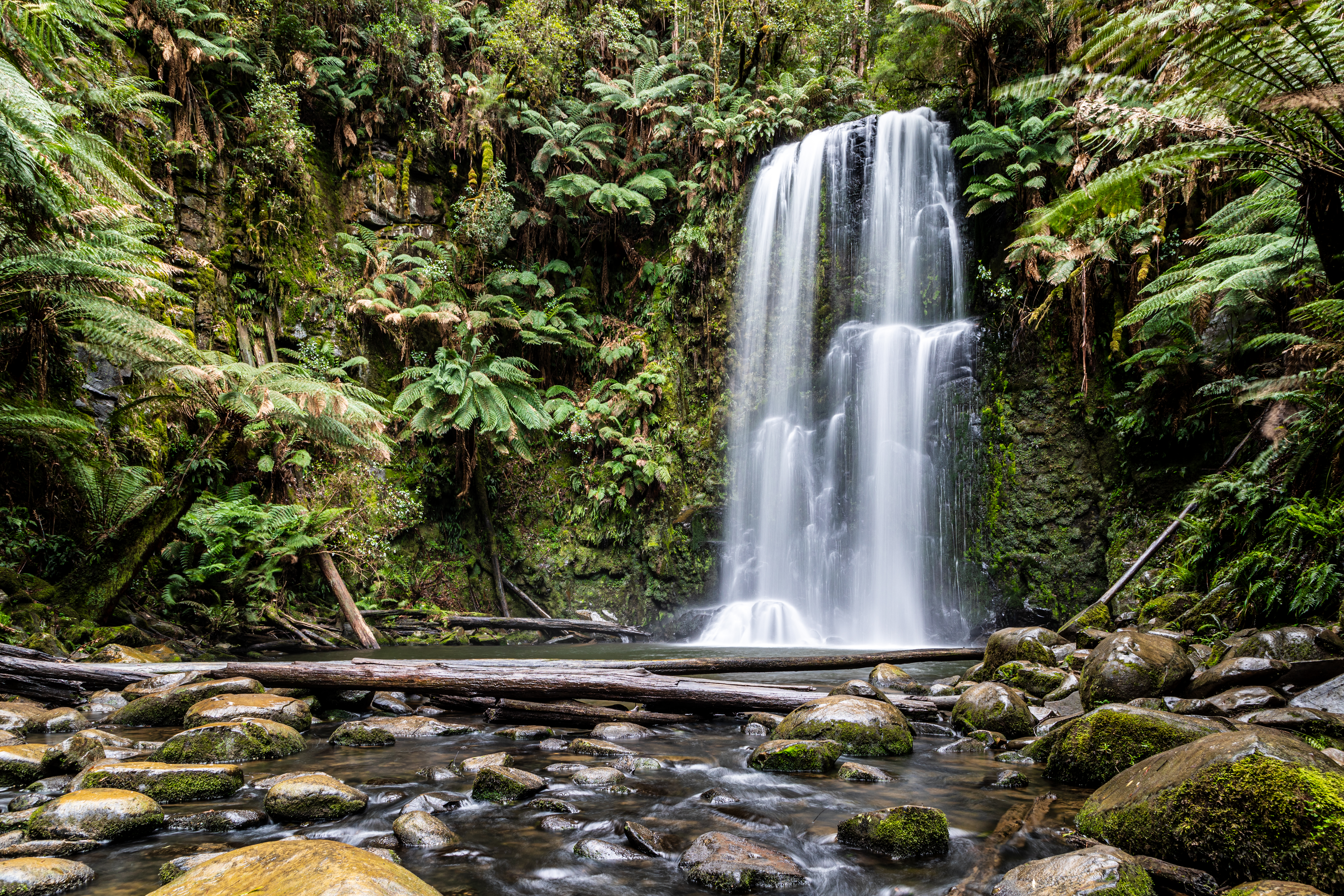
Beech Forest (AU), Great Otway National Park, Beauchamp Falls

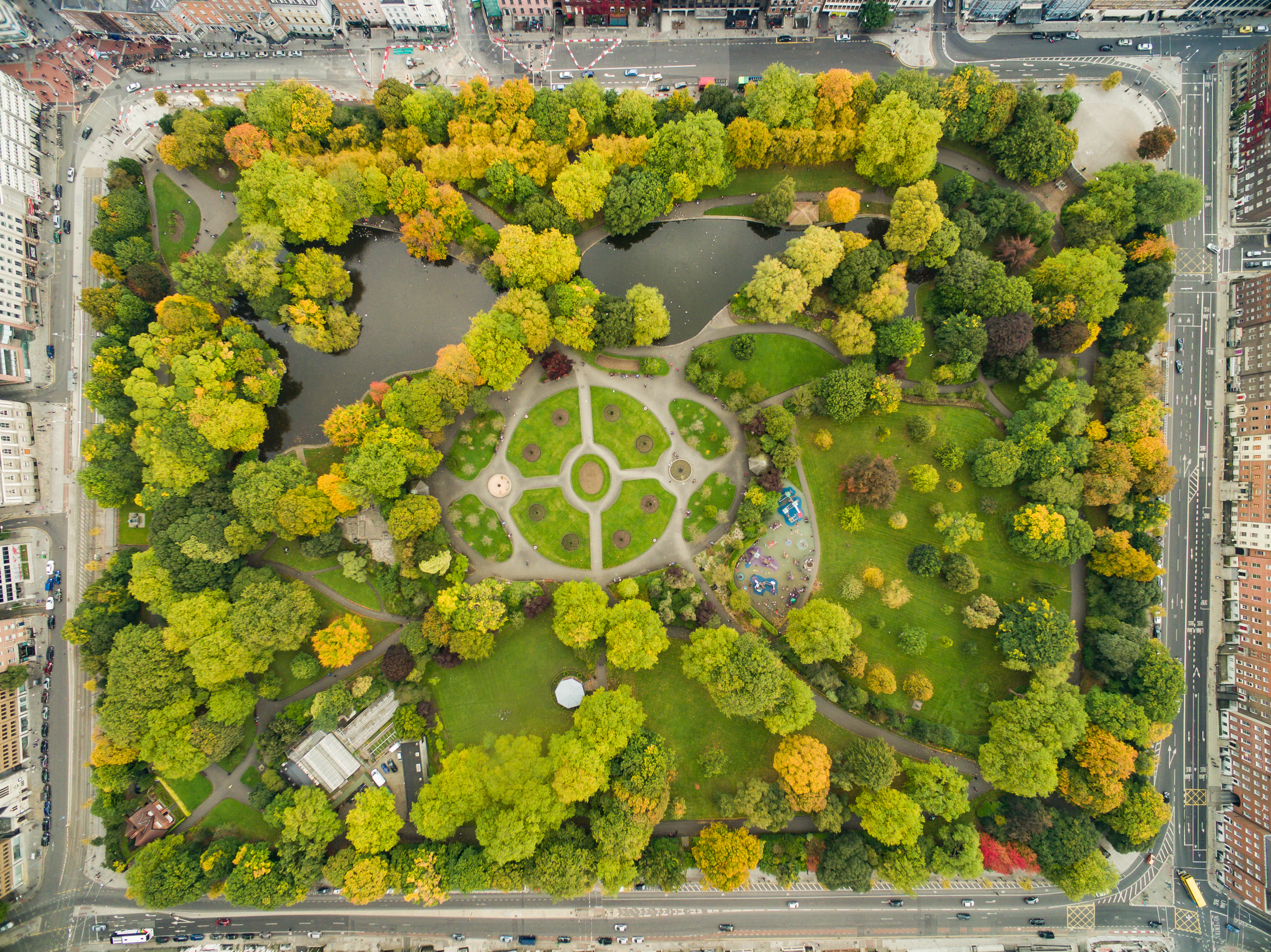
Saint Stephen's Green, Dublin, Ireland

A park is a protected area of wildlife. It is a natural sustainable habitat. Parks promote a culture of wellness that engages members of their surrounding communities and promotes healthy and active lifestyles. People who volunteer at parks may support these sustainable habitats and help to maintain them.

Parks may serve as recreational areas for communities, encouraging people to spend time in nature. Urban parks are in urban areas, creating a natural space that benefits those living in cities.

Plants and animals may flourish in parks, where they are able to have a sustainable habitat away from the interference of humans. This is especially true of national parks, where land is set aside and preserved. These habitats are sustainable in nature.

=== Cities ===
A sustainable city is a city that is designed and built in an ecologically friendly way. Sustainable cities may also be known as eco-cities or green cities. These cities are constructed with guidelines about spatial planning and operational rules pertaining to urbanism in mind. Spatial planning takes into account ecological, social, cultural, and economic issues and policies. This leads to the creation of mindfully built cities that are aware and conscious of their impact on the environment.

Sustainable cities in earthquake-prone areas are built with input from civil engineers, architects, and urban planners who collaborate on safe architecture that can withstand disasters. This reduces waste and ensures that buildings will last for many years to come. In areas that are protected because of nature and cultural heritage, this heritage may be reflected in the choice of construction materials and the design of the buildings. This helps to preserve culture. Additionally, construction materials and building orientation may be chosen with the intent to mitigate the effects of climate change. Cities may also be planned to include green spaces and trees that reduce heat stress.

== Creating sustainable habitats ==
In creating sustainable habitats, environmental scientists, designers, engineers and architects must not consider any elements as a waste product to be disposed of somewhere off-site, but as a nutrient stream for another process to feed on.

=== Net-Zero Energy Buildings (NZEB) ===
These buildings are made to use the minimum amount of energy possible. When these buildings contain renewable sources they are able to produce the specific amount of energy required to function. In some cases they can produce more than the energy they need and they will harness this energy.

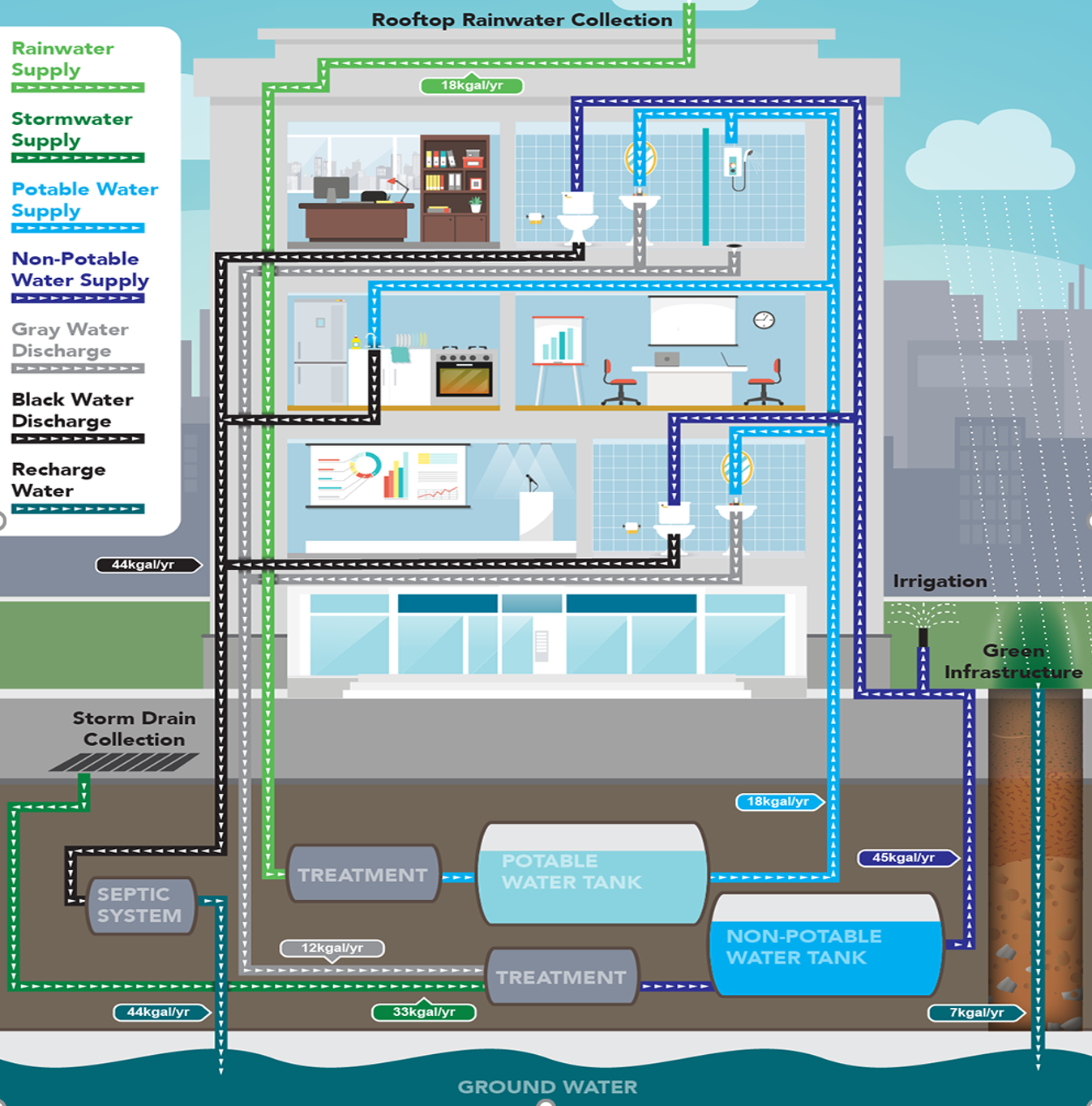
Net Zero Water Building

=== Energy positive buildings ===
Currently, "buildings account for almost 40 percent of global carbon emissions." Energy-positive buildings produce more energy than the energy they demand, this is a demand for most countries that are focused on total carbon emissions. Hydro and the Zero Emission Resource Organisation (ZERO) is a specific company that has created energy-positive buildings in Norway. They have an interesting approach that includes embodied energy, which means that the total energy with every step of collecting materials and constructing the building. For example, timber or wood takes less energy to collect, cut, and construct into something than concrete. Whereas recycled material contains the lowest embodied energy. This company has engineered its buildings to self-ventilate, have maximum daylight, and more. This is one alternative to building sustainable habitats.

== Sustainable building materials ==
=== Concrete ===
Sustainable building materials can change the way we move forward as a society. A very common form of building material is concrete. However, this is not a sustainable resource for building materials because it can crack and degrade over time. An alternative to concrete is bacterial concrete (self-healing concrete), which is a substance that mixes Bacillus pseudofirmus, Bacillus cohnii, and concrete. This mixture can be a sustainable switch because it is a self-healing substance. Since concrete can crack from weathering, plates shifting, and the temperature it is important to consider using something that will last a long time and won't need several repairs. This bacteria concrete improves strength, reduces water absorption, and more. Depending on the bacteria used you can have different effects on the overall durability of the concrete. For example, in a place where chloride is used, you can add Sporosarcina pasteuria to increase the overall resistance to the chloride ion that can penetrate the concrete. Another example is water absorption, in this situation Bacillus sphaericus reduced water absorption. The different types of bacteria can assist in the sustainability of the overall structure and length of the substance. The cost of adding bacteria can be 2.3 to 3.9 times higher in cost than normal concrete.

self-healing concrete that fixes cracks in concrete

=== Wood ===
Wood can be a great resource for building structures because of the longevity of the material. However, since wood is a natural resource specific protocols need to be followed for using this material in order to be a sustainable building. Wood is the most commonly used building material in the United States. Wood has a low carbon impact and a low embodied energy. This is the amount of energy that is required to harvest and create said building.

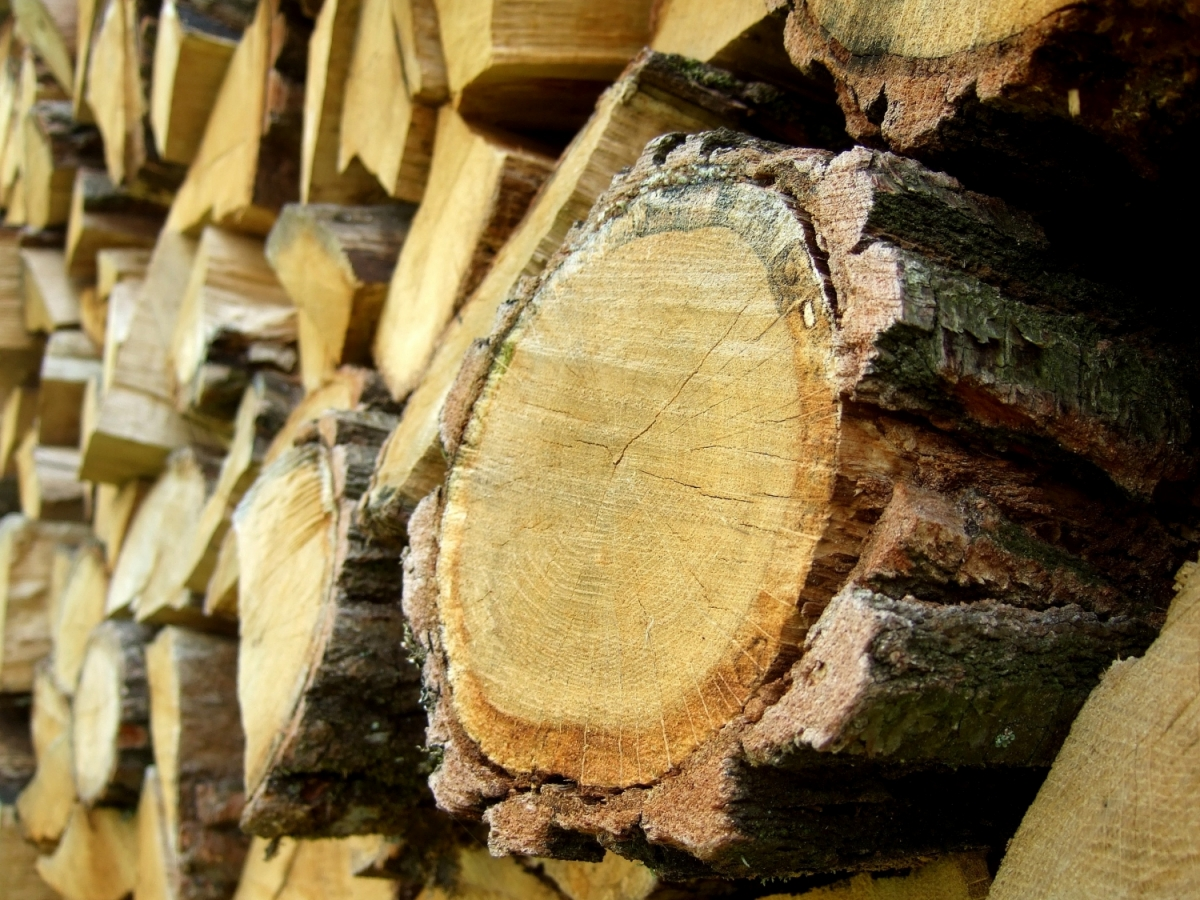
wood

== The process of environmental planning ==
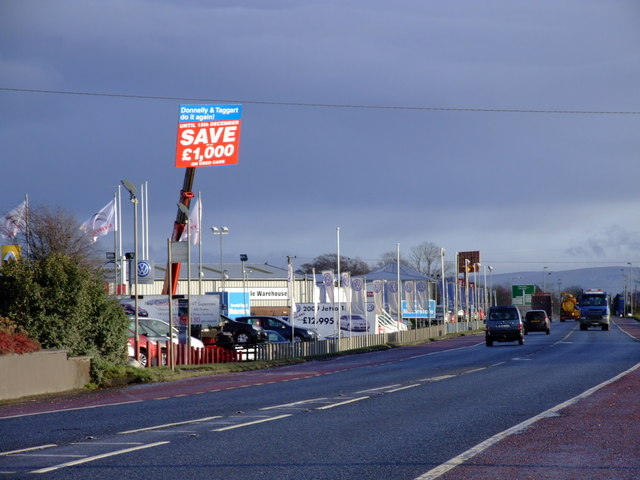
environmental planning

Environmental planning can be numerous things including building structures, effeminacy, and useability. A lot of factors go into play for planning something that is sustainable, and environmentally friendly, while still implementing culture and aspects to improve society. One topic why environmental planning is so important is tourism. When people visit a new place they spend a lot of money, this money goes to the economy of the town with several tourists.

=== List of steps for planning ===
1. Create a planning team
2. Make a vision for future
3. Figure out community wants and needs for the environment
4. Find solutions
5. Create a plan
6. Proceed with plan
7. Evaluate steps and fix any issues.

This list can create a wonderful set of baseline monitoring. This is important for sustainable habitats because it is a framework to ensure that the environment will not be negatively impacted by human actions of creating specific things like parks, houses, community buildings, and more.

== Sustainable transportation ==
Transportation can be considered an important way that an economy can help society succeed. Transportation actually produces 23% of the carbon emissions in the world. Also, it accounts for 64% of the world's oil use. This is a huge percentage of natural resources going into transportation. There are solutions that can be implemented to create a sustainable habitat for the communities and economies of the world. An example of sustainable public transportation in Jakarta, Indonesia, which has won the Sustainable Transport Award. One way they one this award and implemented sustainability is by connecting local buses, vehicles, and micro busses within their cities and urban regions. The city of Jakarta has created a transportation system called BRT system that had specific lanes just for public transportation. This has decreased traffic overall because more people are using the BRT system instead of driving. Something else that the BRT transportation system has is that it can take people farther than the individual car can. This lowered carbon emissions and oil consumption.

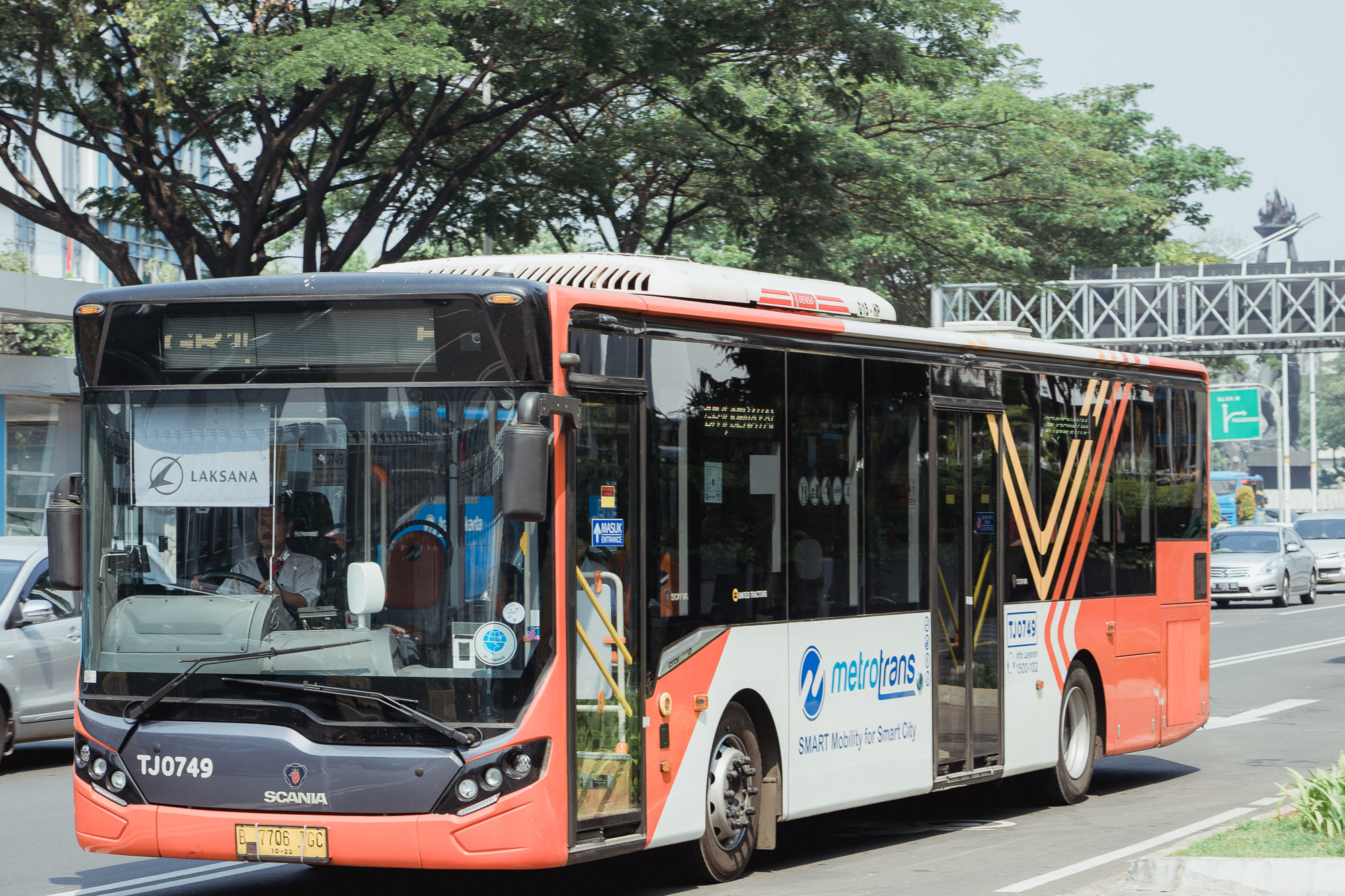
Jakarta metrotrans bus

=== Green energy ===
Green energy is an alternative to using fossil fuels. Some examples are solar energy, wind energy, and nuclear energy. These alternatives use natural energy instead of fossil fuels to promote green electricity. The use of green energy can boost any economy, for example in India it could create a green energy market worth 80 billion by 2030. India has created 59 solar parks in the country. One of the largest parks in India has a capacity of 30 GW for a solar wind hybrid park. All of the parks in India have changed the way the economy works overall. They have decreased the amount of money it cost using fossil fuels because they are using natural energy. They have also implemented a self-cleaning tool that cleans the solar panels in the solar parks they created. Solar panels can get dirty from weathering. This tool cleans the top of the solar panel so that the maximum amount of energy is produced.

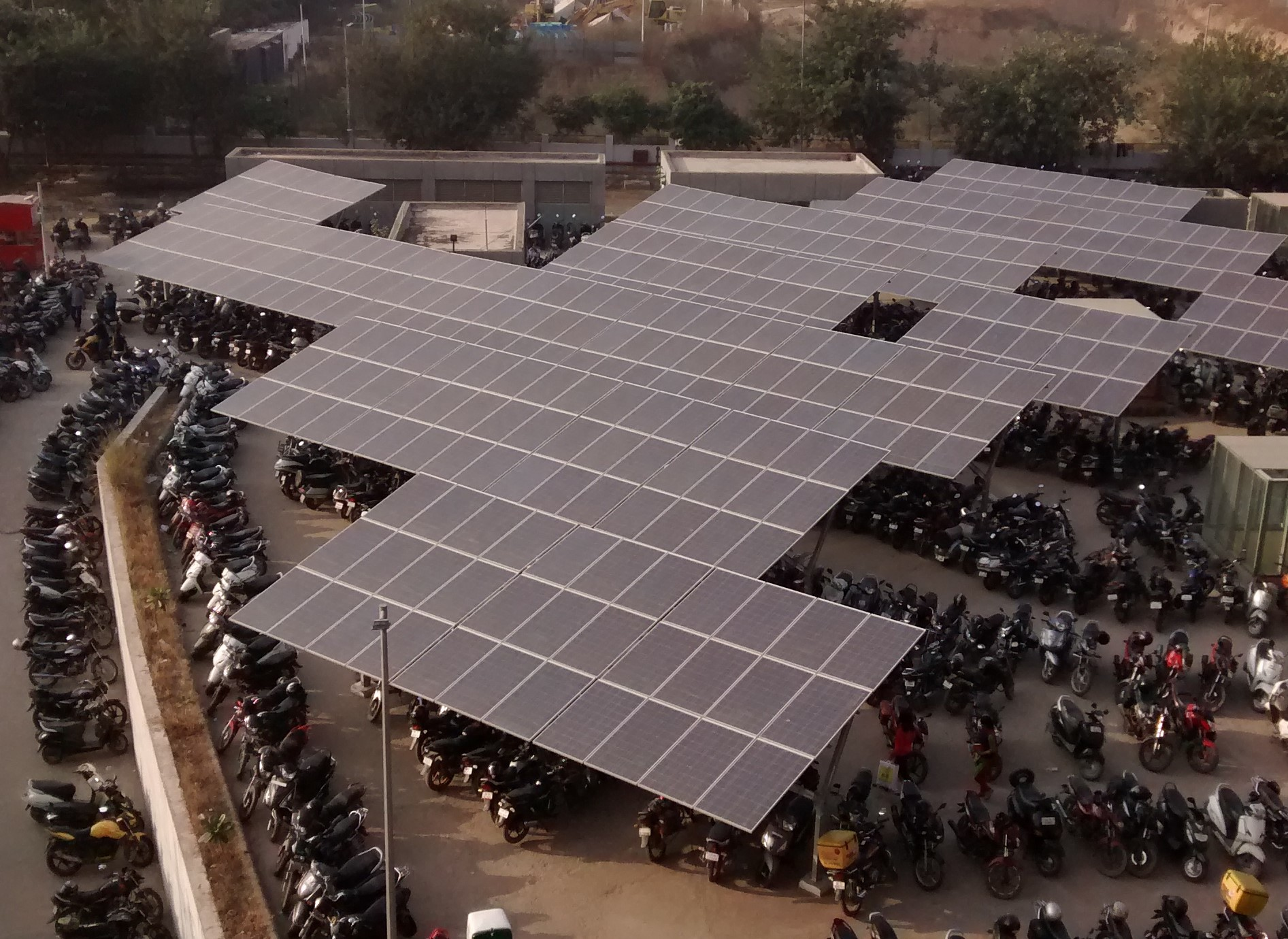
Solar Panels HUDA station in India

== Remedial efforts ==
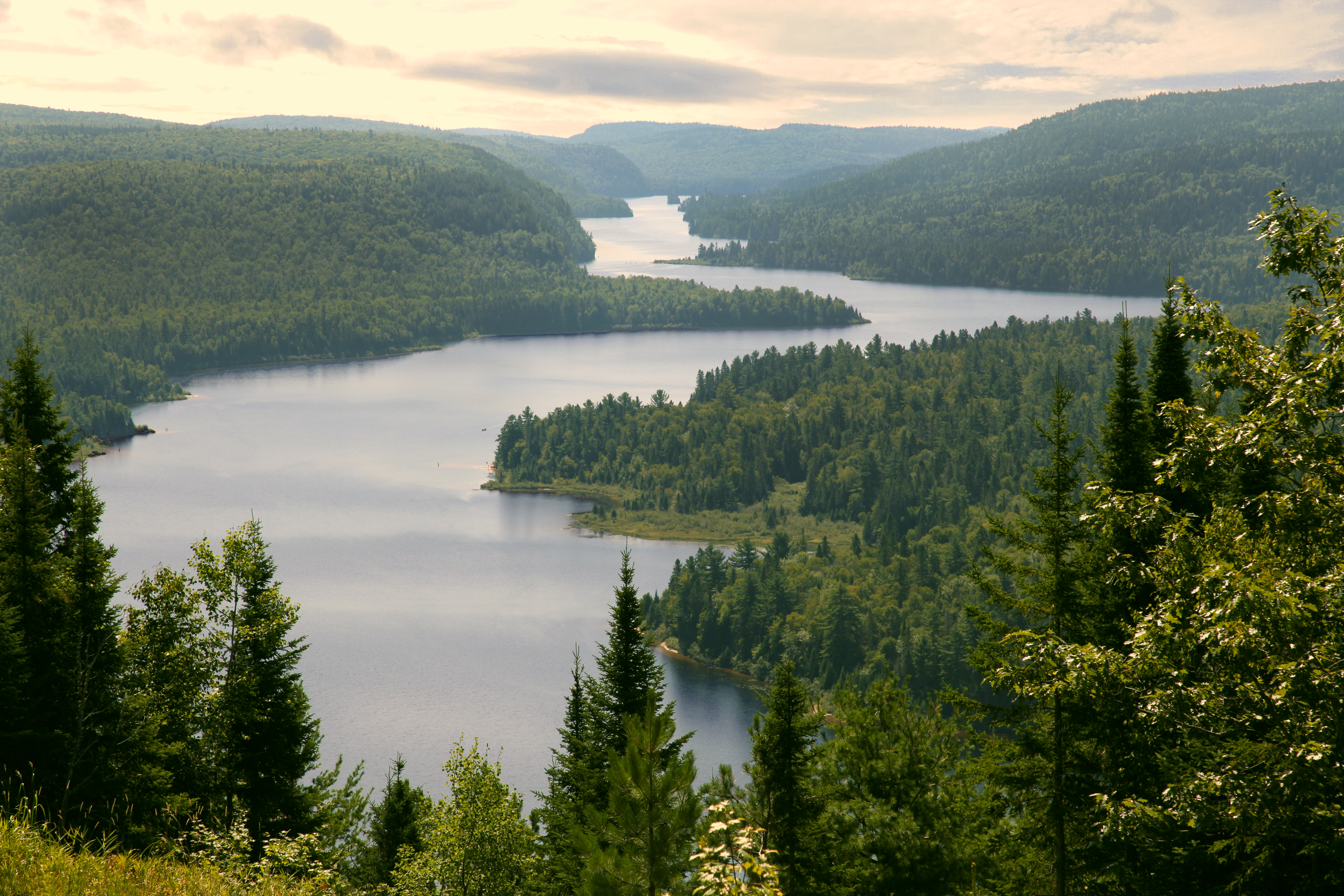
Mauricie National Park.

=== Restoration and protection of parks ===
The restoration and protection of parks begins with the acknowledgement of the need for actions. After a government or state is aware of the need for restoration, protection, and the creation of these sustainable habitats, action takes place.

The need for funding creates the foundational roadblock in protecting and restoring parks. Funding can be received by state legislations and fundraising projects hosted by supporting organizations. This funding can then be systematically distributed to encompass movements that make a significant stride towards protecting and restoring parks. These movements include but are not limited to setting up fences around parks, establishing park security, and supplying and resupplying proper nutritional elements to the parks to sustain and promote growth of habitats.

=== Ocean Governance ===
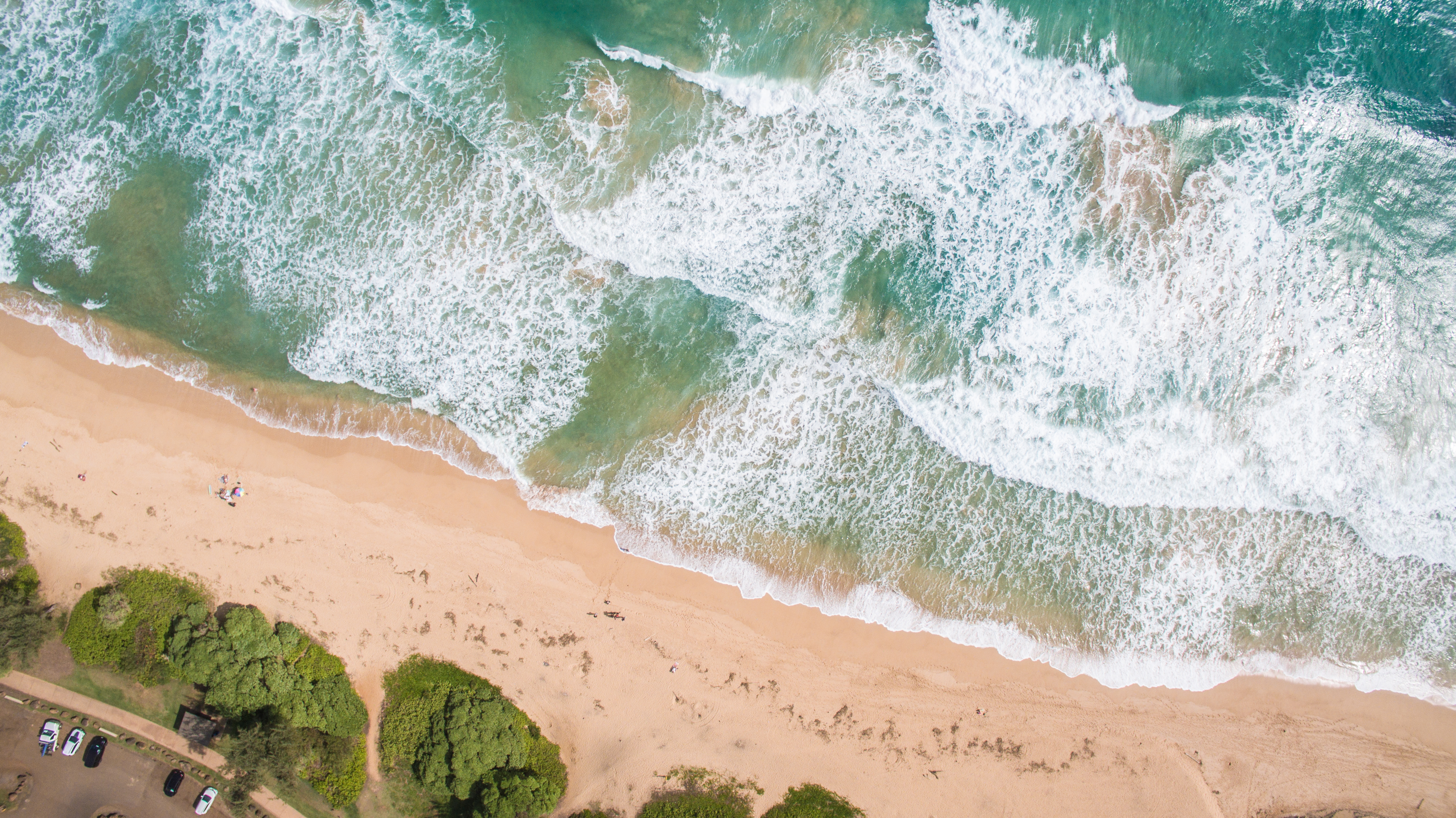
Ocean Shoreline Drone Shot.

Ocean Governance is defined as the “integrated conduct of the policy, actions, and affairs regarding the world’s oceans to protect ocean environment, sustainable use of coastal and marine resources as well as to conserve its biodiversity.”

Ocean governance as a process is recommended to be integrated horizontally and vertically. Integrating a process horizontally entails requiring the participation of “governmental institutions, the private sector, NGOs, academics, [and] scientists”, while integrating a process vertically entails essential communication, collaboration, and coordination between the chosen governmental institutions and other participatory agencies.

Partnership is an essential aspect of ocean governance as it covers all bases of collective remedial efforts. Essentially, it connects local and state governments who both want to induce the remedial efforts. Communication between inter-governmental agencies and regional institutions aids in strengthening collective efforts that are set into motion.

Coastal national parks and oceans are facing many threatening changes to their equilibrium. These include but are not limited to rising sea levels, damaged coral reefs, storm activity, and erosion. At the Timucuan Ecological & Historic Preserve and the Cumberland Island National Seashore, teams such as the National Park Foundation (NPF), National Park Services (NPS), and the Green Team Youth Corps at Groundwork Jacksonville are all making strides to prevent and stabilize eroding shorelines, regrowing native marsh grasses, and reemerging the once stable habitat that was once known as home for a plethora of marine species.

=== Green building ===
Green building is a foundationally different mode of building and operating a series of buildings that contrast to those built in the past in their aspects of sustainability. The buildings funded for by the Green Building Initiative and the United States Green Building Council enable access to “environmentally and socially responsible, healthy, and prosperous environment[s] that improve[s] the quality of life.”

A system by the name of LEED, is “the world’s most widely used green building system with more than 100,000 buildings participating” to date.

Buildings that are funded by the Green Building Initiative and LEED have been proven to be financially, environmentally, and efficiently healthier for individuals. Lower carbon emissions, healthier living spaces, and improved efficiency are all the reap of the crop of the USGBC’s remedial efforts that are “constructed and operated through LEED.”

== See also ==
- Alternative natural materials
- Autonomous building
- Ecovillage
- Integrated Pest Management
- Permaculture
- Principles of Intelligent Urbanism
