= Sporosarcina pasteurii =

Scientific classification
- Domain: Bacteria
- Kingdom: Bacillati
- Phylum: Bacillota
- Class: Bacilli
- Order: Caryophanales
- Family: Caryophanaceae
- Genus: Sporosarcina
- Species: S. pasteurii

Binomial name
- Sporosarcina pasteurii Bergey 2004

Synonyms
- "Urobacillus pasteurii" Miquel 1889; Bacillus pasteurii (Miquel 1889) Chester 1898

Species of bacterium

Sporosarcina pasteurii formerly known as Bacillus pasteurii from older taxonomies, is a gram positive bacterium with the ability to precipitate calcite and solidify sand given a calcium source and urea; through the process of microbiologically induced calcite precipitation (MICP) or biological cementation. S. pasteurii has been proposed to be used as an ecologically sound biological construction material. Researchers studied the bacteria in conjunction with plastic and hard mineral; forming a material stronger than bone. It is a commonly used for MICP since it is non-pathogenic and is able to produce high amounts of the enzyme urease which hydrolyzes urea to carbonate and ammonia.

== Physiology ==
S. pasteurii is a gram positive bacterium that is rod-like shaped in nature. It has the ability to form endospores in the right environmental conditions to enhance its survival, which is a characteristic of its bacillus class. It has dimensions of 0.5 to 1.2 microns in width and 1.3 to 4.0 microns in length. Because it is an alkaliphile, it thrives in basic environments of pH 9–10. It can survive relatively harsh conditions up to a pH of 11.2.

== Metabolism and growth ==
S. pasteurii are soil-borne facultative anaerobes that are heterotrophic and require urea and ammonium for growth. The ammonium is utilized in order to allow substrates to cross the cell membrane into the cell. The urea is used as the nitrogen and carbon source for the bacterium. S. pasteurii are able to induce the hydrolysis of urea and use it as a source of energy by producing and secreting the urease enzyme. The enzyme hydrolyzes the urea to form carbonate and ammonia. During this hydrolysis, a few more spontaneous reactions are performed. Carbamate is hydrolyzed to carbonic acid and ammonia and then further hydrolyzed to ammonium and bicarbonate. This process causes the pH of the reaction to increase 1–2 pH, making the environment more basic which promotes the conditions that this specific bacterium thrives in. Maintaining a medium with this pH can be expensive for large scale production of this bacterium for biocementation. A wide range of factors can affect the growth rate of S. pasteurii. This includes finding the optimal temperature, pH, urea concentration, bacterial density, oxygen levels, etc. It has been found that the optimal growing temperature is 30 °C, but this is independent of the other environmental factors present. Since S. pasteurii are halotolerant, they can grow in the presence of low concentrations of aqueous chloride ions that are low enough to not inhibit bacterial cell growth. This shows promising applications for MICP use.

S. pasteurii DSM 33 is described to be auxotrophic for L-methionine, L-cystein, thiamine and nicotinic acid.

== Genomic properties ==
The whole genome of S. pasteurii NCTC4822 was sequenced and reported under NCBI Accession Number: NZ_UGYZ01000000. With a chromosome length of 3.3 Mb, it contains 3,036 protein coding genes and has GC content of 39.17% . When the ratio of known functional genes to the unknown genes is calculated, the bacterium shows highest ratios for transport, metabolism, and transcription. The high proportion of these functions allows the conversion of urea to carbonate ions which is necessary for the bio-mineralization process. The bacterium has seven identified genes that are directly related to urease activity and assembly as well, which can be further studied to give insight about maximizing urease production for optimizing use of S. pasteurii in industrial applications.

== Applications with MICP ==
S. pasteurii have the unique capability of hydrolyzing urea and through a series of reactions, produce carbonate ions. This is done by secreting copious amounts of urease through the cell membrane. When the bacterium is placed in a calcite rich environment, the negatively charged carbonate ions react with the positive metal ions like calcium to precipitate calcium carbonate, or bio-cement. The calcium carbonate can then be used as a precipitate or can be crystallized as calcite to cement sand particles together. Therefore, when put into a calcium chloride environment, S. pasteurii are able to survive since they are halotolerant and alkaliphiles. Since the bacteria remain intact during harsh mineralization conditions, are robust, and carry a negative surface charge, they serve as good nucleation sites for MICP. The negatively charged cell wall of the bacterium provides a site of interaction for the positively charged cations to form minerals. The extent of this interaction depends on a variety of factors including the characteristics of the cell surface, amount of peptidoglycan, amidation level of free carboxyl, and availability of teichoic acids. S. pasteurii show a highly negative surface charge which can be shown in its highly negative zeta potential of −67 mV compared to non-mineralizing bacteria E. coli, S. aureus and B. subtilis at −28, −26 and −40.8 mV, respectively. Aside from all of these benefits towards using S. pasteurii for MICP, there are limitations like undeveloped engineering scale-up, undesired by-products, uncontrolled growth, or dependence on growth conditions like urea or oxygen concentrations.

== Current and potential applications ==
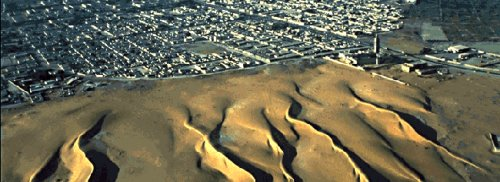
Desertification exemplified by sand dunes advancing on Nouakchott, the capital of Mauritania

S. pasteurii have a purpose in improving construction material as in concrete or mortar. Concrete is one of the most used materials in the world but it is susceptible to forming cracks which can be costly to fix. One solution is to embed this bacterium in the cracks and once it is activated using MICP. Minerals will form and repair the gap in a permanent environmentally-friendly way. One disadvantage is that this technique is possible only for external surfaces that are reachable.

Another application is to use S. pasteurii in bio self-healing of concrete which involves implementing the bacterium into the concrete matrix during the concrete preparation to heal micro cracks. This has a benefit of minimal human intervention and yields more durable concrete with higher compressive strength.

One limitation of using this bacterium for bio-mineralization is that although it is a facultative anaerobe, in the absence of oxygen, the bacterium is unable to synthesize urease anaerobically. A lack of oxygen also prevents MICP since its initiation relies heavily on oxygen. Therefore, at sites distant from the injection location or at great depths, the likelihood of precipitation decreases. One potential fix is to couple this bacterium in the biocement with oxygen releasing compounds (ORCs) that are typically used for bioremediation and removal of pollutants from soil. With this combination, the lack of oxygen can be diminished and the MICP can be optimized with the bacterium.

Some specific examples of current applications include:

- Architecture student Magnus Larsson won the 2008 Holcim Award "Next Generation" first prize for region Africa Middle East for his project "Dune anti-desertification architecture, Sokoto, Nigeria" and his design of a habitable wall. Larssons also presented the proposal at TED.
- Ginger Krieg Dosier's unique biotechnology start-up company, bioMason, in Raleigh, NC has developed a method of growing bricks from Sporosarcina pasteurii and naturally abundant materials. In 2013 this company won the Cradle to Cradle Innovation Challenge (which included a prize of $125,000) and the Dutch Postcode Lottery Green Challenge (which included a prize of 500,000 euros).

More potential applications include:

- Use bacteria to solidify liquefiable soils in areas prone to earthquakes.
- Form bio-bricks
- Stabilize marshes and swamps
- Reduce the settlement rate of buildings
- Remove heavy metals from wastewater
- used as barrier for weed control in agriculture, as an alternative to herbicide

Considerations of using this bacterium in industrial applications is scale-up potential, economic feasibility, long-term viability of bacteria, adhesion behavior of calcium carbonate, and polymorphism.

- Bacteria Might Be the Key to Building the First City on the Moon: Story by Lydia Amazouz

== See also ==
- Great Green Wall (Africa)
