= Ginger Krieg Dosier =

American architect

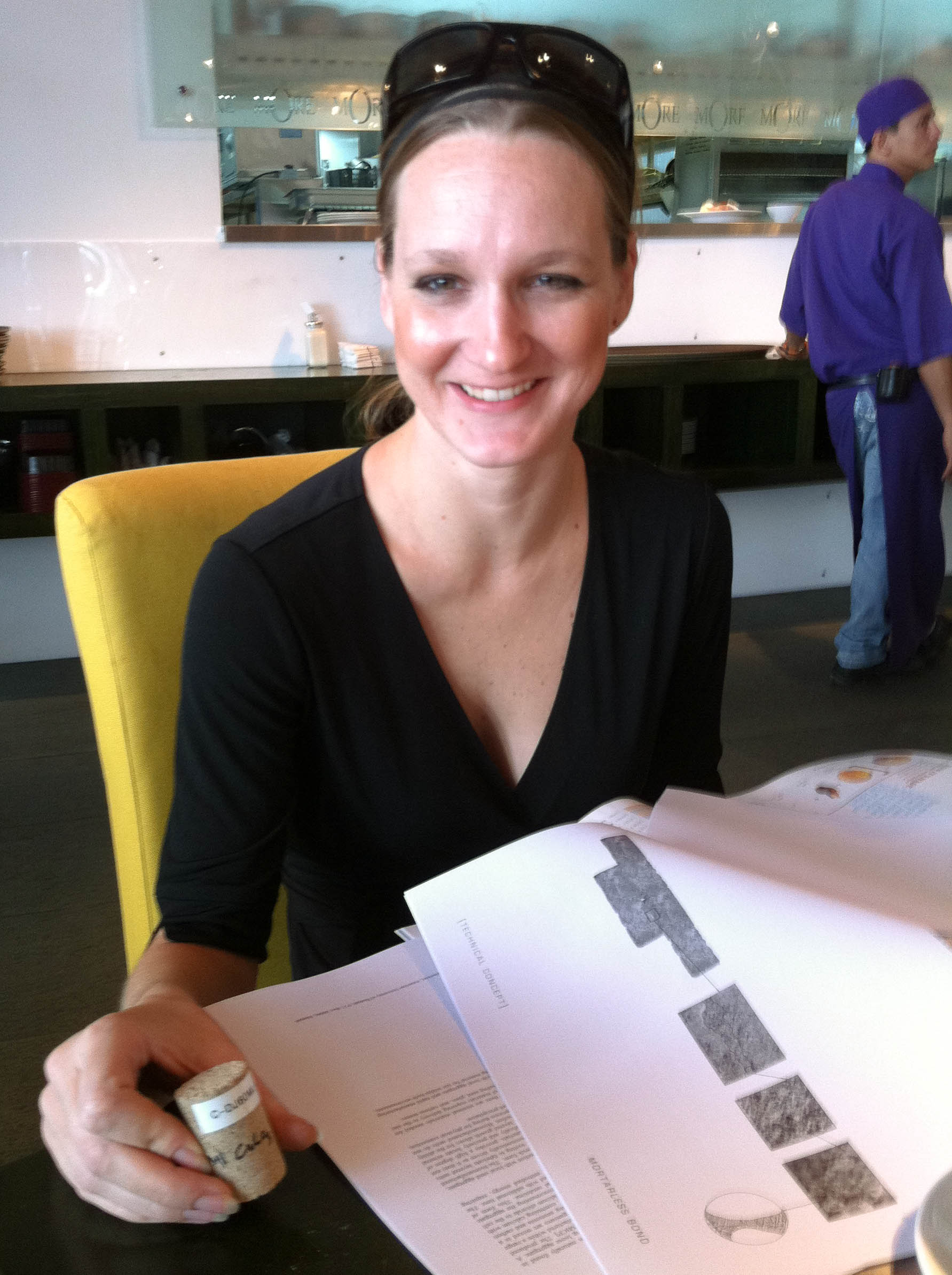
- Occupation: Architect
- Projects: Better Brick

Ginger Krieg Dosier is an American architect who, in 2010, developed a technique for using microbiologically induced calcite precipitation to manufacture bricks for construction.

Dosier's brick-making method consists of filling a rectangular form with sand layered intermittently with a solution containing urea, calcium chloride, and the non-pathogenic bacteria Sporosarcina pasteurii. After several days, the bacteria create a chemical chain reaction producing a mineral that binds the sand together into a brick. Because this process does not involve firing the brick in a kiln as in conventional brick-making, Dosier estimates that her method could reduce carbon emissions by 800 million tons each year.

Dosier is the winner of the 2010 Metropolis Next Generation Design Competition. She is the CEO of bioMASON, a biotechnology start-up grown from her Better Brick project. The company was the winner of the 2013 Dutch Postcode Lottery Green Challenge, one of the world's largest and longest-running start-up competitions focused on sustainable businesses.
