= Cementation (geology) =

Process of chemical precipitation bonding sedimentary grains

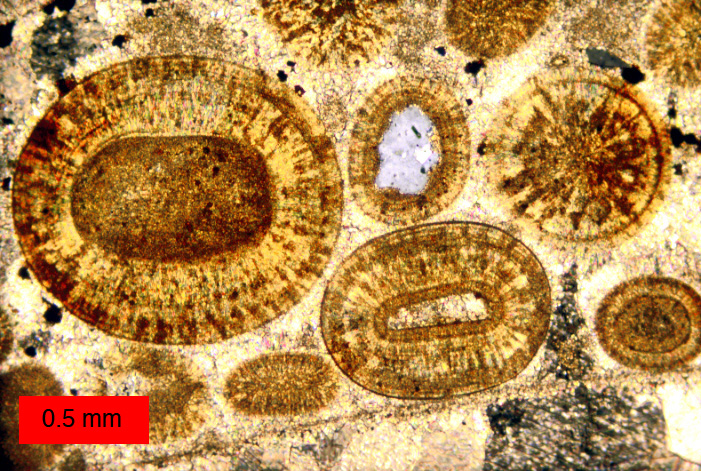
Calcite cement in an ooid-rich limestone; Carmel Formation, Jurassic of Utah

Cementation is a process where minerals bond grains of sediment together by growing around them. This means precipitation of ions carried in groundwater to form new crystalline material between sedimentary grains. The new pore-filling minerals form "bridges" between original sediment grains, thereby binding them together. In this way, sand becomes sandstone, and gravel becomes conglomerate or breccia.

Cementation occurs as part of the diagenesis or lithification of sediments and occurs primarily below the water table regardless of sedimentary grain sizes present. Large volumes of pore water must pass through sediment pores for new mineral cements to crystallize and so millions of years are generally required to complete the cementation process. Common mineral cements include calcite, quartz, and silica phases like cristobalite, iron oxides, and clay minerals; other mineral cements also occur.

Cementation is continuous in the groundwater zone, so much so that the term "zone of cementation" is sometimes used interchangeably. Cementation occurs in fissures or other openings of existing rocks and is a dynamic process more or less in equilibrium with a dissolution or dissolving process.

Cement found on the sea floor is commonly aragonite and can take different textural forms. These textural forms include pendant cement, meniscus cement, isopachous cement, needle cement, botryoidal cement, blocky cement, syntaxial rim cement, and coarse mosaic cement. The environment in which each of the cements is found depends on the pore space available. Cements that are found in phreatic zones include: isopachous, blocky, and syntaxial rim cements. As for calcite cementation, which occurs in meteoric realms (freshwater sources), the cement is produced by the dissolution of less stable aragonite and high-Mg calcite.

Classifying rocks while using the Folk classification depends on the matrix, which is either sparry (prominently composed of cement) or micritic (prominently composed of mud).

== Types of carbonate cement ==
Beachrock is a type of carbonate beach sand that has been cemented together by a process called synsedimentary cementation. Beachrock may contain meniscus cements or pendant cements. As the water between the narrow spaces of grains drains from the beachrock, a small portion of it is held back by capillary forces, where meniscus cement will form. Pendant cements form on the bottom of grains where water droplets are held.

Carbonate hardgrounds are hard crusts of carbonate material that form on the bottom of the ocean floor, below the lowest tide level. Isopachous (which means equal thickness) cement forms in subaqueous conditions where the grains are completely surrounded by water.

Carbonate cements can also be formed by biological organisms such as Sporosarcina pasteurii, which binds sand together given organic compounds and a calcium source (Chou et al., 2010).

Cementing has significant effects on the properties and stability of many soil materials. Cementation is not always easily identified and its effects cannot be easily determined quantitatively. It is known to contribute to clay tenderness and may be responsible for an apparent preconsolidation pressure. The filtration of iron compounds from a very sensitive clay from Labrador, Canada, resulted in a 30 t/m reduction in apparent preconsolidation pressure. Coop and Airey (2003) show that for carbonate soils, cementation develops immediately after deposition and allows the soil to maintain a loose structure. Non-recognition of cementation has resulted in construction disputes. For example, a land on a major Project is marked as glacier on contract drawings. It was so hard that it had to be detonated. The contractor claimed that the soil was cemented during excavation as it was formed due to the clay matrix as well as the gravel. The owner concluded that this was due to the weathering of the pebbles. Proper evaluation of the material before the award of the contract could have avoided the problem. Clay particles adhere to the surfaces of larger silt and sand particles, a process called clay bonding. Eventually, larger grains are embedded in a clay matrix and their influence on geotechnical behavior is limited. The clay confinement maintains a large void ratio even at high effective stresses, allowing the interparticle forces to spring up.
