= Microbiologically induced calcite precipitation =

Bio-geochemical process

Microbiologically induced calcium carbonate precipitation (MICP) is a bio-geochemical process that induces calcium carbonate precipitation within the soil matrix. Biomineralization in the form of calcium carbonate precipitation can be traced back to the Precambrian period. Calcium carbonate can be precipitated in three polymorphic forms, which in the order of their usual stabilities are calcite, aragonite and vaterite. The main groups of microorganisms that can induce the carbonate precipitation are photosynthetic microorganisms such as cyanobacteria and microalgae; sulfate-reducing bacteria; and some species of microorganisms involved in nitrogen cycle. Several mechanisms have been identified by which bacteria can induce the calcium carbonate precipitation, including urea hydrolysis, denitrification, sulfate production, and iron reduction. Two different pathways, or autotrophic and heterotrophic pathways, through which calcium carbonate is produced have been identified. There are three autotrophic pathways, which all result in depletion of carbon dioxide and favouring calcium carbonate precipitation. In heterotrophic pathway, two metabolic cycles can be involved: the nitrogen cycle and the sulfur cycle. Several applications of this process have been proposed, such as remediation of cracks and corrosion prevention in concrete, biogrout, sequestration of radionuclides and heavy metals.

== Metabolic pathways ==
=== Autotrophic pathway ===
All three principal kinds of bacteria that are involved in autotrophic production of carbonate obtain carbon from gaseous or dissolved carbon dioxide. These pathways include non-methylotrophic methanogenesis, anoxygenic photosynthesis, and oxygenic photosynthesis. Non-methylotrophic methanogenesis is carried out by methanogenic archaebacteria, which use CO_{2} and H_{2} in anaerobiosis to give CH_{4}.

=== Heterotrophic pathway ===
Two separate and often concurrent heterotrophic pathways that lead to calcium carbonate precipitation may occur, including active and passive carbonatogenesis. During active carbonatogenesis, the carbonate particles are produced by ionic exchanges through the cell membrane by activation of calcium and/or magnesium ionic pumps or channels, probably coupled with carbonate ion production. During passive carbonatogenesis, two metabolic cycles can be involved, the nitrogen cycle and the sulfur cycle. Three different pathways can be involved in the nitrogen cycle: ammonification of amino acids, dissimilatory reduction of nitrate, and degradation of urea or uric acid. In the sulfur cycle, bacteria follow the dissimilatory reduction of sulfate.

==== Ureolysis or degradation of urea ====
The microbial urease catalyzes the hydrolysis of urea into ammonium and carbonate. One mole of urea is hydrolyzed intracellularly to 1 mol of ammonia and 1 mole of carbamic acid (1), which spontaneously hydrolyzes to form an additional 1 mole of ammonia and carbonic acid (2).

CO(NH_{2})_{2} + H_{2}O → NH_{2}COOH + NH_{3} (1)

NH_{2}COOH + H_{2}O → NH_{3} + H_{2}CO_{3} (2)

Ammonium and carbonic acid form bicarbonate and 2 moles of ammonium and hydroxide ions in water (3 &4).

2NH_{3} + 2H_{2}O ↔ 2NH^{+}_{4} +2OH^{−} (3)
H_{2}CO_{3} ↔ HCO^{−}_{3} + H^{+} (4)

The production of hydroxide ions results in the increase of pH, which in turn can shift the bicarbonate equilibrium, resulting in the formation of carbonate ions (5)

HCO^{−}_{3} + H^{+} + 2NH^{+}_{4} +2OH^{−} ↔ CO_{3}^{−2} + 2NH^{+}_{4} + 2H_{2}O (5)

The produced carbonate ions precipitate in the presence of calcium ions as calcium carbonate crystals (6).

Ca^{+2} + CO_{3}^{−2} ↔ CaCO_{3} (6)

The formation of a monolayer of calcite further increases the affinity of the bacteria to the soil surface, resulting in the production of multiple layers of calcite.

== Possible applications ==
=== Material science ===
MICP has been reported as a long-term remediation technique that has been exhibited high potential for crack cementation of various structural formations such as granite and concrete.

==== Treatment of concrete ====
MICP has been shown to prolong concrete service life due to calcium carbonate precipitation. The calcium carbonate heals the concrete by solidifying on the cracked concrete surface, mimicking the process by which bone fractures in human body are healed by osteoblast cells that mineralize to reform the bone. Two methods are currently being studied: injection of calcium carbonate precipitating bacteria. and by applying bacteria and nutrients as a surface treatment. Increase in strength and durability of MICP treated cement mortar and concrete has been reported.

==== Precast materials (tiles, bricks, etc.) ====
Architect Ginger Krieg Dosier won the 2010 Metropolis Next Generation Design Competition for her work using microbial-induced calcite precipitation to manufacture bricks while lowering carbon dioxide emissions. She has since founded Biomason, Inc., a company that employs microorganisms and chemical processes to manufacture building materials.

==== Fillers for rubber, plastics and ink ====
MICP technique may be applied to produce a material that can be used as a filler in rubber and plastics, fluorescent particles in stationery ink, and a fluorescent marker for biochemistry applications, such as western blot.

=== Liquefaction prevention ===
Microbial induced calcium carbonate precipitation has been proposed as an alternative cementation technique to improve the properties of potentially liquefiable sand. The increase in shear strength, confined compressive strength, stiffness and liquefaction resistance was reported due to calcium carbonate precipitation resulting from microbial activity. The increase of soil strength from MICP is a result of the bonding of the grains and the increased density of the soil. Research has shown a linear relationship between the amount of carbonate precipitation and the increase in strength and porosity. A 90% decrease in porosity has also been observed in MICP treated soil. Light microscopic imaging suggested that the mechanical strength enhancement of cemented sandy material is caused mostly due to point-to-point contacts of calcium carbonate crystals and adjacent sand grains.

One-dimensional column experiments allowed the monitoring of treatment progration by the means of change in pore fluid chemistry. Triaxial compression tests on untreated and bio-cemented Ottawa sand have shown an increase in shear strength by a factor of 1.8. Changes in pH and concentrations of urea, ammonium, calcium and calcium carbonate in pore fluid with the distance from the injection point in 5-meter column experiments have shown that bacterial activity resulted in successful hydrolysis of urea, increase in pH and precipitation of calcite. However, such activity decreased as the distance from the injection point increased. Shear wave velocity measurements demonstrated that positive correlation exists between shear wave velocity and the amount of precipitated calcite.

One of the first patents on ground improvement by MICP was the patent "Microbial Biocementation" by Murdoch University (Australia). A large scale (100 m^{3}) have shown a significant increase in shear wave velocity was observed during the treatment. Originally MICP was tested and designed for underground applications in water saturated ground, requiring injection and production pumps. Recent work has demonstrated that surface percolation or irrigation is also feasible and in fact provides more strength per amount of calcite provided because crystals form more readily at the bridging points between sand particles over which the water percolates.

Benefits of MICP for liquefaction prevention

MICP has the potential to be a cost-effective and green alternative to traditional methods of stabilizing soils, such as chemical grouting, which typically involve the injection of synthetic materials into the soil. These synthetic additives are typically costly and can create environmental hazards by modifying the pH and contaminating soils and groundwater. Excluding sodium silicate, all traditional chemical additives are toxic. Soils engineered with MICP meet green construction requirements because the process exerts minimal disturbance to the soil and the environment.

==== Possible limitations of MICP as a cementation technique ====
MICP treatment may be limited to deep soil due to limitations of bacterial growth and movement in subsoil. MICP may be limited to the soils containing limited amounts of fines due to the reduction in pore spaces in fine soils. Based on the size of microorganism, the applicability of biocementation is limited to GW, GP, SW, SP, ML, and organic soils. Bacteria are not expected to enter through pore throats smaller than approximately 0.4 μm. In general, the microbial abundance was found to increase with the increase in particle size. On the other hand, the fine particles may provide more favorable nucleation sites for calcium carbonate precipitation because the mineralogy of the grains could directly influence the thermodynamics of the precipitation reaction in the system. The habitable pores and traversable pore throats were found in coarse sediments and some clayey sediments at shallow depth. In clayey soil, bacteria are capable of reorienting and moving clay particles under low confining stress (at shallow depths). However, inability to make these rearrangements under high confining stresses limits bacterial activity at larger depths. Furthermore, sediment-cell interaction may cause puncture or tensile failure of the cell membrane. Similarly, at larger depths, silt and sand particles may crush and cause a reduction in pore spaces, reducing the biological activity. Bacterial activity is also impacted by challenges such as predation, competition, pH, temperature, and nutrient availability. These factors can contribute to the population decline of bacteria. Many of these limitations can be overcome through the use of MICP through bio-stimulation - a process through which indigenous ureolytic soil bacteria are enriched in situ. This method is not always possible as not all indigenous soils have enough ureolytic bacteria to achieve successful MICP.

=== Remediation for heavy metal and radionuclide contamination ===
MICP is a promising technique that can be used for containment of various contaminants and heavy metals. The availability of lead in soil may reduced by its chelation with the MICP product, which is the mechanism responsible for lead immobilization. MICP can be also applied to achieve sequestration of heavy metals and radionuclides. Microbially induced calcium carbonate precipitation of radionuclide and contaminant metals into calcite is a competitive co-precipitation reaction in which suitable divalent cations are incorporated into the calcite lattice. Europium, a trivalent lanthanide, which was used as a homologue for trivalent actinides, such as Pu(III), Am(III), and Cm(III), was shown to incorporate into the calcite phase substituting for Ca(II) as well as in a low-symmetry site within the biomineral.

== Prevention ==
Shewanella oneidensis inhibits the dissolution of calcite under laboratory conditions.
