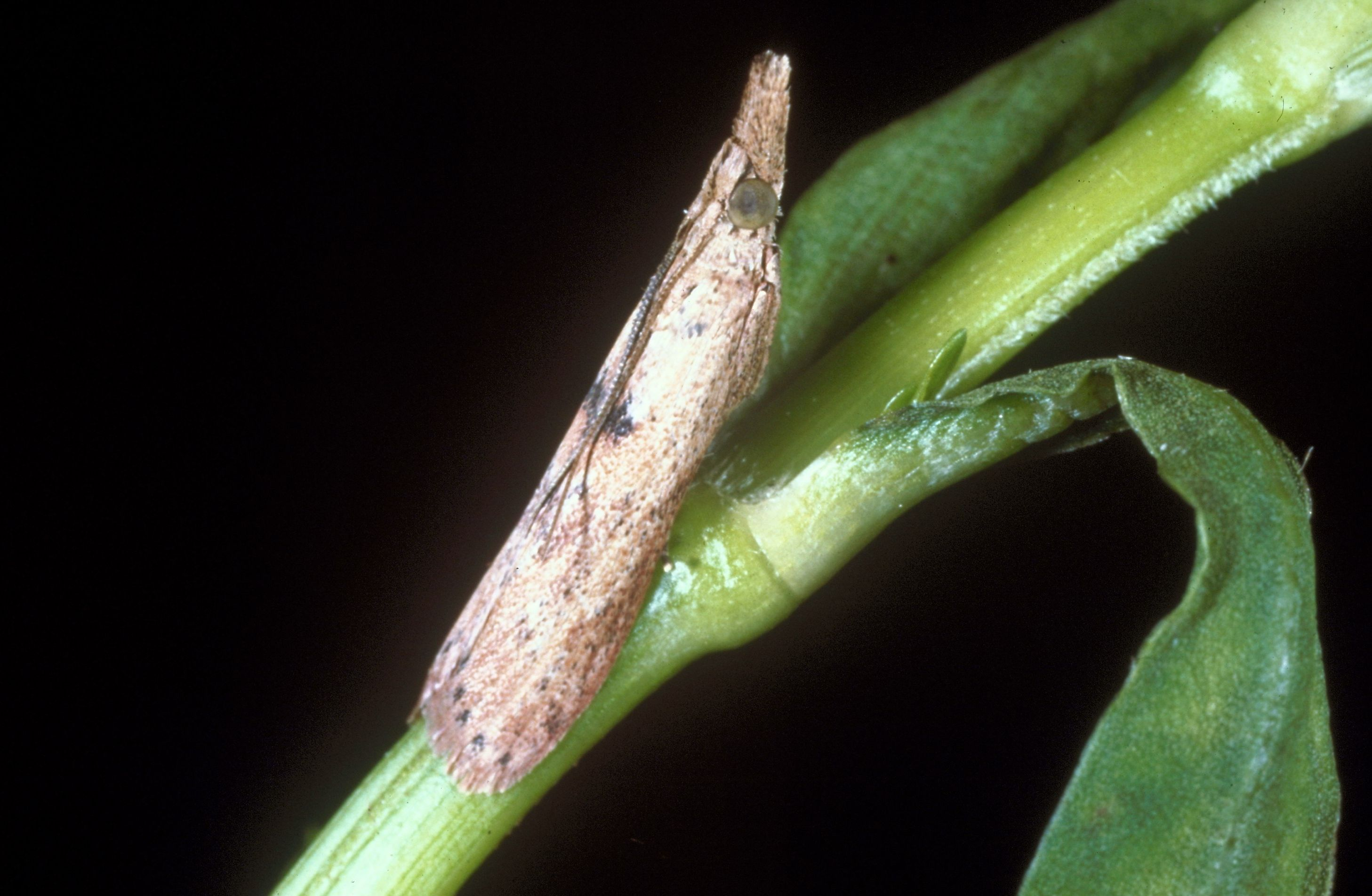

Scientific classification
- Kingdom: Animalia
- Phylum: Arthropoda
- Clade: Pancrustacea
- Class: Insecta
- Order: Lepidoptera
- Family: Pyralidae
- Subfamily: Phycitinae
- Tribe: Phycitini
- Genus: Arcola; J. C. Shaffer, 1995
- Species: A. malloi

Binomial name
- Arcola malloi (Pastrana, 1961)

Synonyms
- Genus: Vogtia Pastrana, 1961; Species: Vogtia malloi Pastrana, 1961

= Arcola malloi =

Species of moth

Arcola malloi (formerly Vogtia malloi) is a species of snout moth known as the alligator weed stem borer. It is the only species in the genus Arcola. It is used as an agent of biological pest control against the noxious aquatic plant known as alligator weed (Alternanthera philoxeroides).

This moth is native to South America. It was introduced to the United States in the 1970s to attack the alligator weed. It is now established in populations of the weed in the southeastern United States. The adult moth is brown and an elongated arrowhead shape about 13 millimeters long. The female lays between 200 and 300 white eggs during her week-long adult life. The larva is white when first emerged from its egg and quickly turns brown and striped. The larva bores into the stem of the alligator weed and consumes it from the inside out, generally destroying between four and eight stems before pupating. It pupates in a cocoon inside the hollowed-out stem for ten days.

Alligator weed which has been attacked by the larva has areas of dead leaves distal to the point at which the larva has destroyed the stem, blocking nutrient flow. A mat of the weed can be quickly eliminated in heavy infestation. This moth and the alligator weed flea beetle may be found in a single mat of alligator weed; in this case, the two insects work in synergy and the weed rarely recovers.
