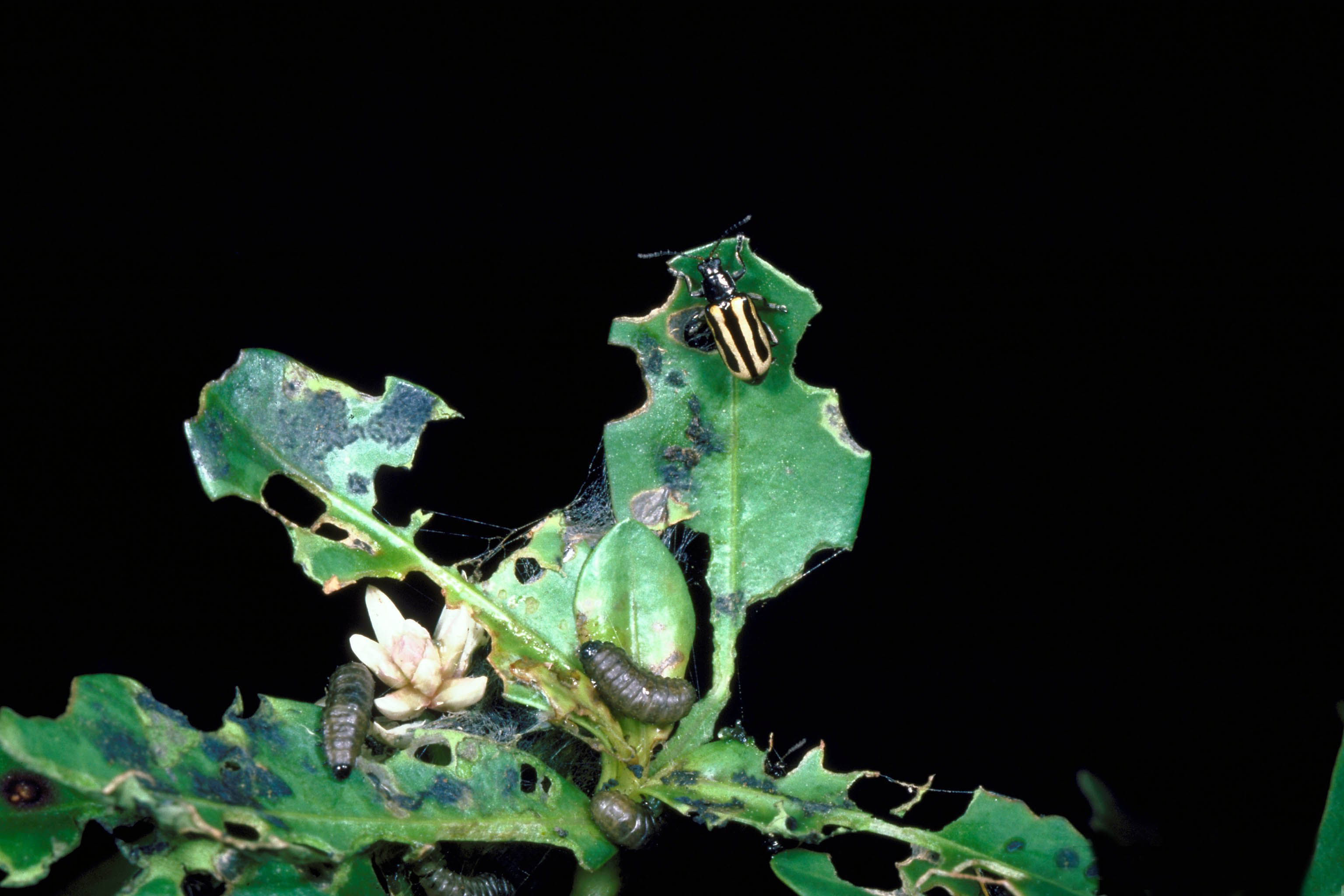
- Agasicles hygrophila

Scientific classification
- Kingdom: Animalia
- Phylum: Arthropoda
- Class: Insecta
- Order: Coleoptera
- Suborder: Polyphaga
- Infraorder: Cucujiformia
- Family: Chrysomelidae
- Subfamily: Galerucinae
- Tribe: Alticini
- Genus: Agasicles; Jacoby, 1905

Type species
- Agasicles vittata Jacoby, 1905

= Agasicles (beetle) =

Genus of leaf beetles

Agasicles is a genus of flea beetles belonging to the family Chrysomelidae. The species of this genus are native to South America, though the species Agasicles hygrophila has been introduced to the southeastern United States as a biological control agent against alligator weed.

== Species ==
The genus includes five species:

- Agasicles connexa (Boheman, 1859)
- Agasicles hygrophila Selman & Vogt, 1971
- Agasicles interrogationis (Clark, 1865)
- Agasicles opaca Bechyné, 1959
- Agasicles vittata Jacoby, 1905
