= B. R. Subba Rao =

Indian entomologist (1925–2020)

B.R. Subba Rao
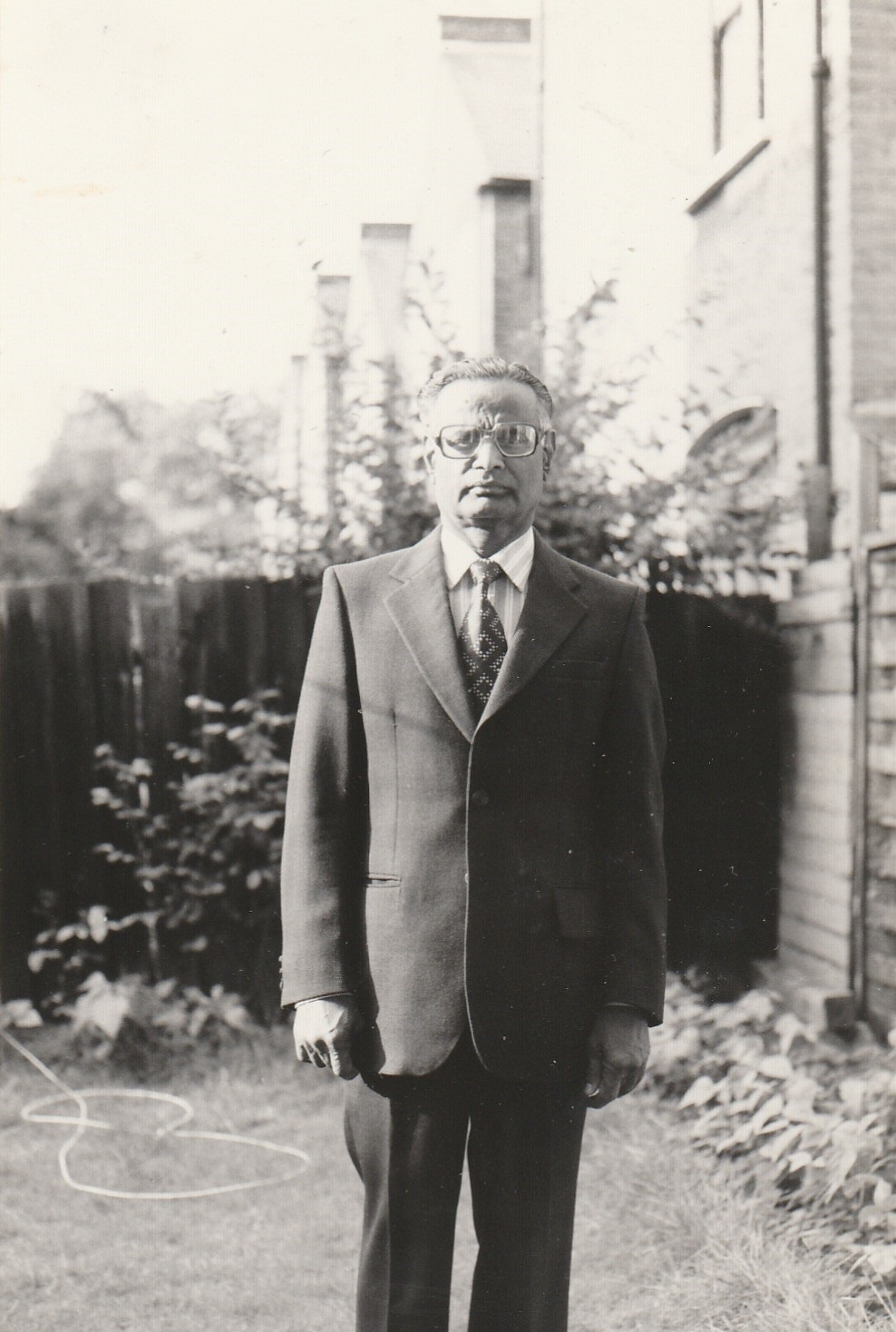
- Rao in 1968
- Born: Bokinakere Ramakrishnaiya Subba Rao; 25 August 1925; Mysore, India
- Died: 29 November 2020 (aged 95); London, England
- Education: University of Mysore, Karnataka, India
- Occupations: Entomologist; Umpire; Linesman
- Years active: 1948–1995

Bokinakere Ramakrishnaiya Subba Rao (25 August 1925 – 29 November 2020) was an Indian-origin entomologist who worked at the Commonwealth Institute of Entomology. He was a specialist on biological control and described many species of parasitic wasps including Neodusmetia sangwani which is considered one of the most successful examples of classical biological control. Rao also served as a linesman and umpire at Wimbledon from 1969 to 1995.

== Life and work ==
Rao was born in Mysore to B. K. Ramakrishnaiya (a District and Sessions Judge) and Parvathamma. He received his B Sc (Hons.) Zoology from Central College, Bangalore, then under the University of Mysore, as also his PhD. He worked at the Indian Agricultural Research Institute with E.S. Narayanan and then at the Commonwealth Institute of Biological Control in Bangalore. He moved to the Commonwealth Institute of Entomology in London in June 1968. He specialized in the taxonomy of the superfamily Chalcidoidea. One of the insect species discovered in Hessarghatta was described by Subba Rao, Neodusmetia sangwani, a parasitic wasp considered one of the successful examples of classical biological control. It was used to control an outbreak of Rhodesgrass scale insect Antonina graminis in the United States of America in the 1960s. Another species that he described was Thompsonisca sankarani, named after T. Sankaran who headed the Indian CIBC station, which is an important biological control agent of the mango scale Pseudaulacaspis barberi. Rao was also a keen sportsman who played cricket, tennis and took part in athletics in his undergraduate days. A shoulder injury made him quit tennis but he served as an umpire in India at the Davis Cup in 1950 and after moving to London he was selected to serve at the Wimbledon Lawn Tennis Association in 1969. He was awarded the Alistair Wotherspoon Salver by the British Tennis Umpires Association for 1989 and retired in 1995. Among his recollections was an incident at the court:

I was at the net cord on No. 1 Court, Martina Navratilova was playing. An insect was flying around her, so unable to play. The Chair asked me to sort it. I went over and caught the insect in my hand,-it was a male bee. I said “it’s only a male it can’t hurt you” ...afterwards I realized what I said!

He also took a keen interest in Indian classical music, knew the ragas, could play the violin, and was a regular at the Bharatiya Vidya Bhavan in London. In 1998 he published a compilation of biographies of Indian entomologists. His wife Saroja predeceased him and he was survived by his two sons Somashekar and Sundaresh in London.
