= Amynothrips andersoni =

Alligator weed thrips

Scientific classification
- Kingdom: Animalia
- Phylum: Arthropoda
- Clade: Pancrustacea
- Class: Insecta
- Order: Thysanoptera
- Family: Phlaeothripidae
- Genus: Amynothrips
- Species: A. andersoni

Binomial name
- Amynothrips andersoni O'Neill, 1968

Species of thrip

Amynothrips andersoni is a species of thrips known as alligator weed thrips. It has been used as an agent of biological pest control against the noxious aquatic plant known as alligator weed (Alternanthera philoxeroides).

This thrips is native to South America. It has been imported and released in the United States to feed upon alligator weed. It is now established in much of the southeastern United States. The adult thrips is 2 millimeters long, shiny, and black. A short-winged form and a long-winged flying form exist; the latter is rare. The female lays about 200 eggs during her ninety-day adult lifespan. If the female mates with a male she produces male and female offspring; if she goes unmated, her eggs will all yield male offspring. The eggs are tan ovoids half a millimeter long. The larva is tan in its first stage and bright scarlet red in its second. Both larva and adult feed upon the alligator weed, generally on leaf buds and along leaf edges, causing curling of the leaves and stunting of the plant.
