= Samea borboraula =

Scientific classification
- Kingdom: Animalia
- Phylum: Arthropoda
- Class: Insecta
- Order: Lepidoptera
- Family: Crambidae
- Genus: Samea
- Species: S. borboraula

Binomial name
- Samea borboraula (Meyrick, 1936)

Synonyms
- Oeobia borboraula Meyrick, 1936

Species of moth

Samea borboraula is a moth in the family Crambidae. It is found in Argentina.
