= Samea forsteri =

Scientific classification
- Kingdom: Animalia
- Phylum: Arthropoda
- Class: Insecta
- Order: Lepidoptera
- Family: Crambidae
- Genus: Samea
- Species: S. forsteri

Binomial name
- Samea forsteri (Amsel, 1956)

Synonyms
- Pterygisus forsteri Amsel, 1956

Species of moth

Samea forsteri is a moth in the family Crambidae. It is found in Venezuela.
