= Entomovector =

An entomovector is a pollinating insect used as a vector to spread a substance used in the biocontrol of plant pests and diseases. The insect is typically a honey bee, bumblebee, or mason bee, but may be any variety of insect that spreads pollen among plants. The choice of vector species is decided by a combination of native species in the area to be pollinated, the plant species to be treated, and the ease of care of the vector species.

The substance is typically a powdered substance containing a virus, bacterium, or fungus to be used to protect the host plant from a given disease or pest. The insect, or vector, is typically exposed to this material by placing a tray containing the powder at a hive exit or by using fans to blow it into the hive.

Heikki Hokkanen and Ingeborg Menzler-Hokkanen first used the term "entomovector technology". The term "entomovectoring" was coined in 2006, and the concept of entomovector technology was developed in 2007.
