= Samea alophalis =

Scientific classification
- Kingdom: Animalia
- Phylum: Arthropoda
- Class: Insecta
- Order: Lepidoptera
- Family: Crambidae
- Genus: Samea
- Species: S. alophalis

Binomial name
- Samea alophalis Hampson, 1912

Species of moth

Samea alophalis is a moth in the family Crambidae. It was described by George Hampson in 1912. It is found in Suriname.
