= Samea obliteralis =

Scientific classification
- Kingdom: Animalia
- Phylum: Arthropoda
- Class: Insecta
- Order: Lepidoptera
- Family: Crambidae
- Genus: Samea
- Species: S. obliteralis

Binomial name
- Samea obliteralis Walker, 1866

Species of moth

Samea obliteralis is a moth in the family Crambidae. It was described by Francis Walker in 1866. It is found in Brazil.
