= Samea bipunctalis =

Scientific classification
- Kingdom: Animalia
- Phylum: Arthropoda
- Class: Insecta
- Order: Lepidoptera
- Family: Crambidae
- Genus: Samea
- Species: S. bipunctalis

Binomial name
- Samea bipunctalis Warren, 1888

Species of moth

Samea bipunctalis is a moth in the family Crambidae. It was described by Warren in 1888. It is found in Pakistan.

The forewings are dull fuscous, with two obscure darker transverse bands. One straight near the base and the other near the hind margin. The two stigmata are dark fuscous and there is a short, wedge-shaped, straw-coloured spot before the orbicular and a larger, subquadrate one between the stigmata, and a large pale costal blotch of the same colour before the second transverse line, reaching more than half across the wing, and filling up the concavity in the line. On the costa, beyond the line, another smaller pale spot is found. The hindwings are very pale straw-colour, with a central spot, a sinuous submarginal band and a broad marginal band. All are dull fuscous, as are the thorax, abdomen and fringes.
