= Samea calligraphalis =

Scientific classification
- Kingdom: Animalia
- Phylum: Arthropoda
- Class: Insecta
- Order: Lepidoptera
- Family: Crambidae
- Genus: Samea
- Species: S. calligraphalis

Binomial name
- Samea calligraphalis (Snellen, 1892)

Synonyms
- Pterygisus calligraphalis Snellen, 1892

Species of moth

Samea calligraphalis is a moth in the family Crambidae. It was described by Snellen in 1892. It is found in Indonesia (Java).
