= Samea antisema =

Scientific classification
- Kingdom: Animalia
- Phylum: Arthropoda
- Class: Insecta
- Order: Lepidoptera
- Family: Crambidae
- Genus: Samea
- Species: S. antisema

Binomial name
- Samea antisema (Meyrick, 1886)

Synonyms
- Isopteryx antisema Meyrick, 1886

Species of moth

Samea antisema is a moth in the family Crambidae. It was described by Edward Meyrick in 1886. It is found on Vanuatu.

The wingspan is about 16 mm. The forewings are whitish, slightly ochreous tinged and with a dark fuscous fascia near the base, which is dilated towards the costa into a quadrate spot. The first line is irregular, dark fuscous and runs from before one-fourth of the costa to beyond one-third of the inner margin. It is dilated on the costa and bordering by a moderate dark fuscous quadrate spot beneath the costa. There is a smaller transverse dark fuscous discal spot in the middle, its lower edge connected with the first line near the inner margin by an irregular line. The space between this and the second line is fuscous except towards the costa. The second line is dark fuscous and there is an indistinct fuscous suffusion before the apex, as well as a fuscous hindmarginal line. The hindwings are white with a moderately broad blackish fuscous median band and a fuscous hindmarginal line.
