= Samea calonalis =

Scientific classification
- Kingdom: Animalia
- Phylum: Arthropoda
- Class: Insecta
- Order: Lepidoptera
- Family: Crambidae
- Genus: Samea
- Species: S. calonalis

Binomial name
- Samea calonalis Walker, 1859

Synonyms
- Samea catonalis

Species of moth

Samea calonalis is a moth in the family Crambidae. It is found in Brazil.

Adults are brownish, tinged with cupreous or purplish. The wings have two very irregular and diffuse yellow iridescent nearly hyaline bands formed of spots and patches. This yellow area is much more prevalent on the hindwings.
