= Samea delicata =

Scientific classification
- Kingdom: Animalia
- Phylum: Arthropoda
- Class: Insecta
- Order: Lepidoptera
- Family: Crambidae
- Genus: Samea
- Species: S. delicata

Binomial name
- Samea delicata Kaye, 1923

Species of moth in the family Crambidae

Samea delicata is a moth in the family Crambidae. It is found in Trinidad and Costa Rica.

The wingspan is about 16 mm. The forewings are pale straw-coloured, with two dark spots on the costa close to the base and some further minute points as far as the end of the cell. There are slender submedian, median and postmedian lines. Beyond the last is a dark marginal band. The discoidal spot is formed of a double line. The hindwings are pale straw-colour with three transverse lines, as well as a very fine dark subterminal line.
