= Samea sylvialis =

Scientific classification
- Kingdom: Animalia
- Phylum: Arthropoda
- Class: Insecta
- Order: Lepidoptera
- Family: Crambidae
- Genus: Samea
- Species: S. sylvialis

Binomial name
- Samea sylvialis (Walker, 1859)

Synonyms
- Botys sylvialis Walker, 1859; Mimudea sylvialis; Margaronia mnesigramma Meyrick, 1936; Botys myopicalis Lederer, 1863

Species of moth

Samea sylvialis is a moth in the family Crambidae. It is found in Brazil, Venezuela and Costa Rica.

Adults are cinereous brown, the wings with a slight purplish tinge. The interior and exterior lines are whitish. The forewings have dark brown orbicular and reniform marks, the latter forming a short streak, contained in a small whitish spot. The interior line on the hindwings is indistinct.
