= Biological pest control =

Controlling pests using other organisms

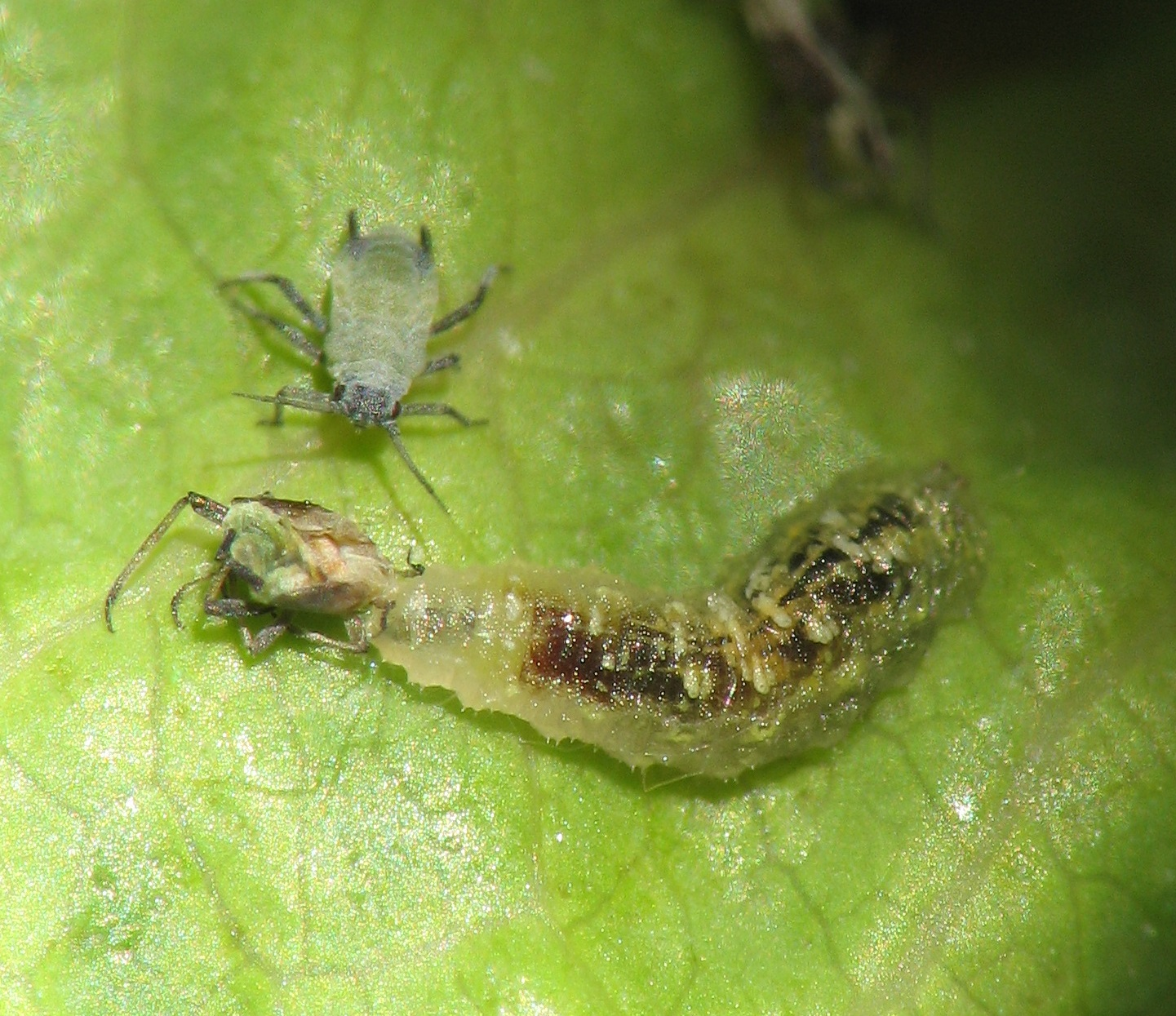
Syrphus hoverfly larva (below) feed on aphids (above), making them natural biological control agents.

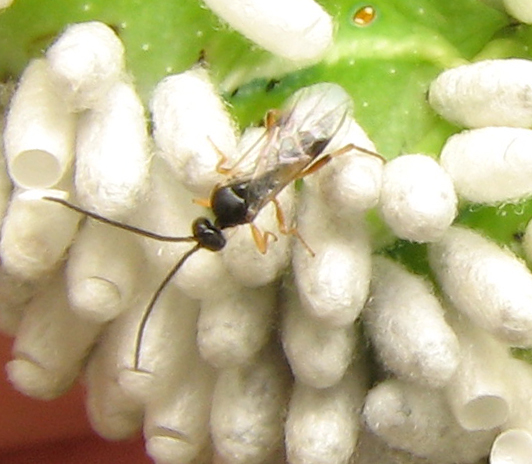
A parasitoid wasp (Cotesia congregata) adult with pupal cocoons on its host, a tobacco hornworm (Manduca sexta, green background), an example of a hymenopteran biological control agent

Biological control or biocontrol is a method of controlling pests, whether animals, weed plants, or pathogens of animals or of plants by using other organisms. It relies on predation, parasitism, and herbivory, but typically involves an active human management role. It can be a component of integrated pest management (IPM) programs. Invertebrates and other macroorganisms are registered as biological control agents by the authorities in the US and Europe very differently from microorganisms, which are registered as biopesticides.

There are three basic strategies for biological control: classical (importation), where a natural enemy of a pest is introduced in the hope of achieving control; inductive (augmentation), in which a large population of natural enemies are administered for quick pest control; and inoculative (conservation), in which measures are taken to maintain natural enemies through regular reestablishment.

Natural enemies of insects play an important part in limiting the densities of potential pests. Biological control agents such as these include predators, parasitoids, pathogens, and competitors. Biological control agents of plant diseases are most often referred to as antagonists. Biological control agents of weeds include seed predators, herbivores, and plant pathogens.

Biological control can have side-effects on biodiversity through attacks on non-target species by any of the above mechanisms, especially when a species is introduced without a thorough understanding of the possible consequences.

== History ==
=== Ancient China ===
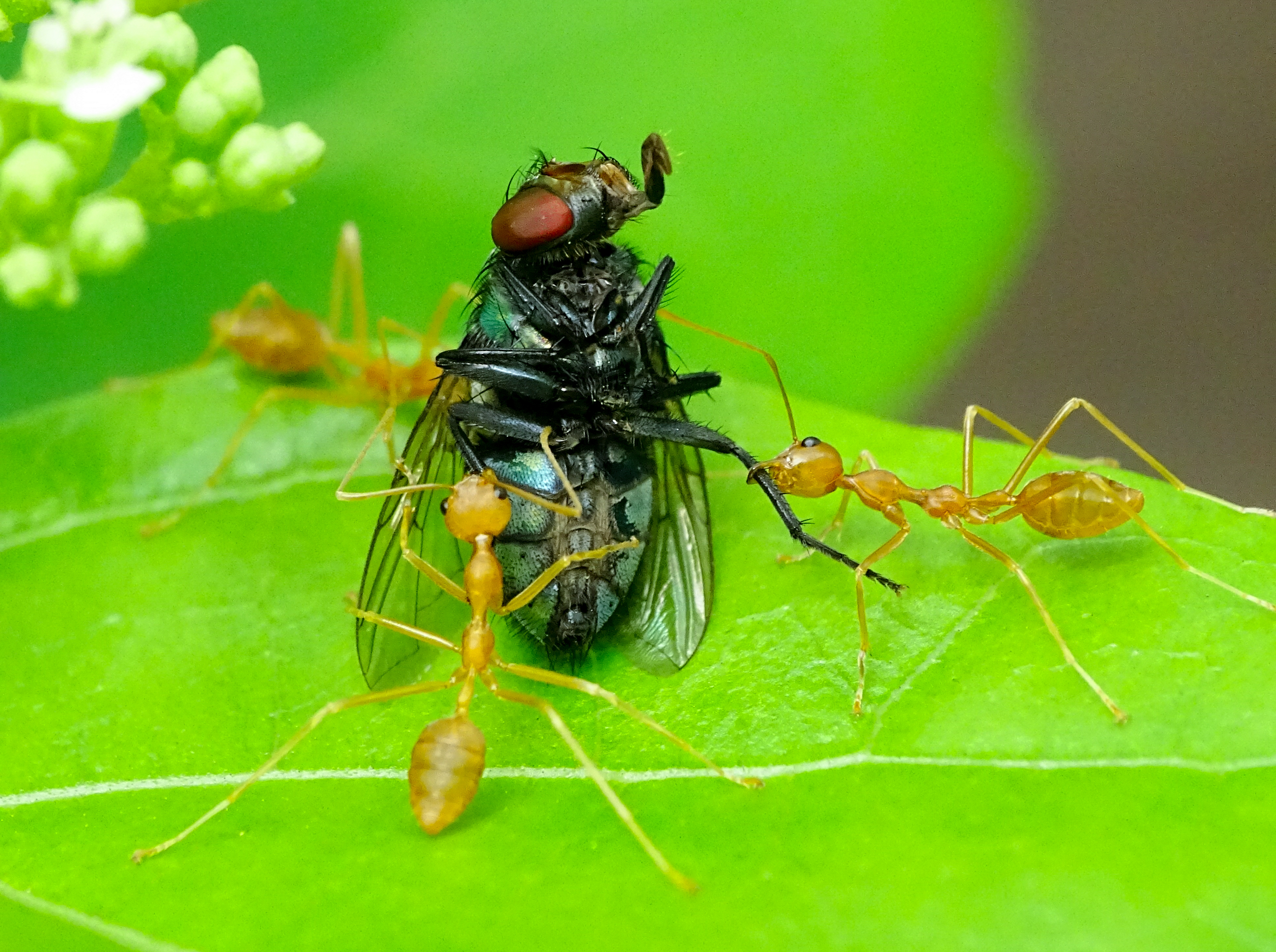
Oecophylla smaragdina ants were sold in ancient China for use in protecting citrus trees.

The first report of the use of an insect species to control an insect pest comes from "Nanfang Caomu Zhuang" (南方草木狀 Plants of the Southern Regions) (c. 304 AD), attributed to Western Jin dynasty botanist Ji Han (嵇含, 263–307), in which it is mentioned that "Jiaozhi people sell ants and their nests attached to twigs looking like thin cotton envelopes, the reddish-yellow ant being larger than normal. Without such ants, southern citrus fruits will be severely insect-damaged". The ants used are known as huang gan ("yellow citrus") ants (Oecophylla smaragdina). The practice was later reported by Ling Biao Lu Yi (late Tang dynasty or Early Five Dynasties), in Ji Le Pian by Zhuang Jisu (Southern Song dynasty), in the Book of Tree Planting by Yu Zhen Mu (Ming dynasty), in the book Guangdong Xing Yu (17th century), Lingnan by Wu Zhen Fang (Qing dynasty), in Nanyue Miscellanies by Li Diao Yuan, and others.

=== Modern era ===
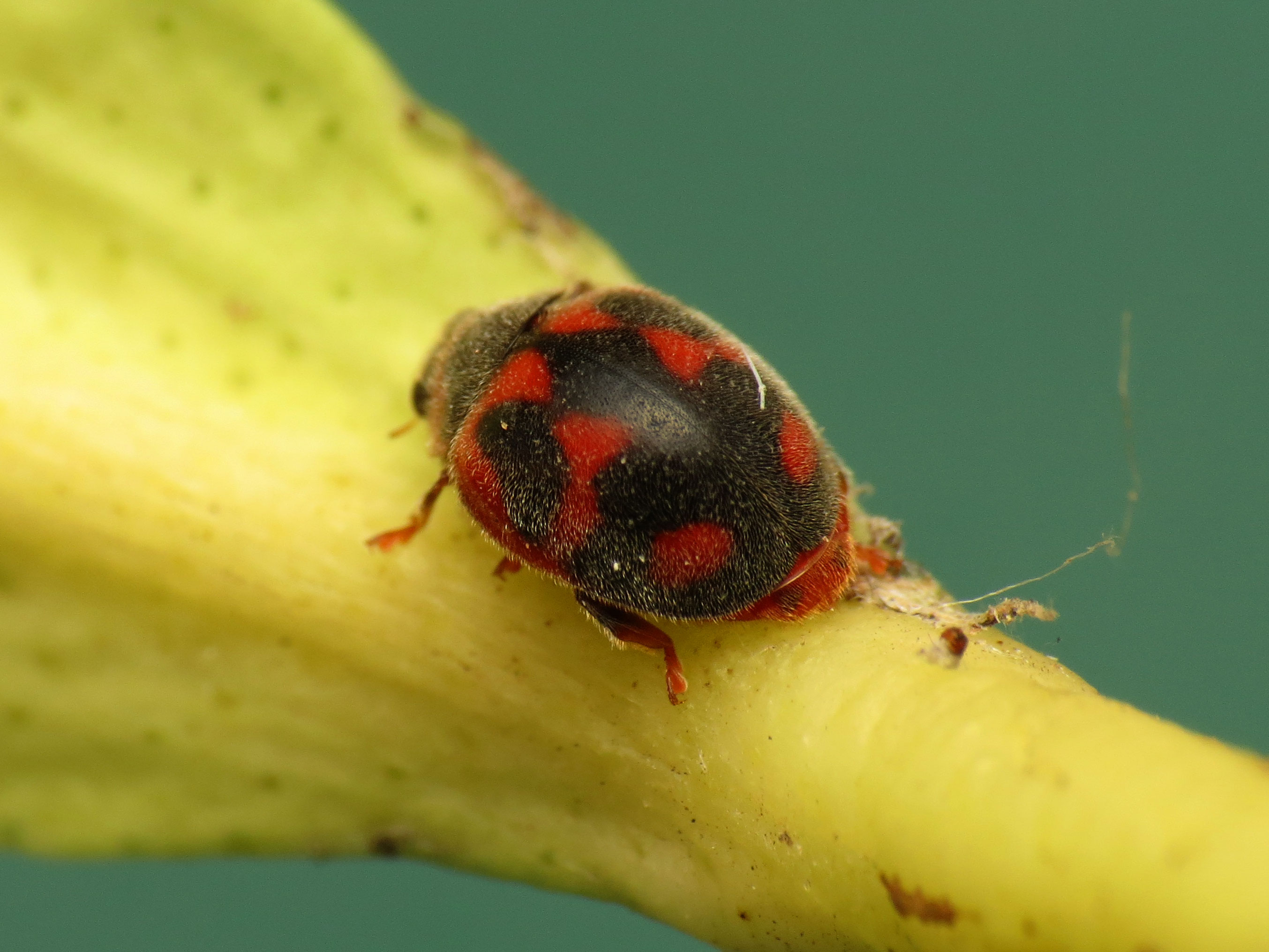
The vedalia beetle was imported from Australia to California in the 19th century, successfully controlling cottony cushion scale on orange trees.

Modern biological control techniques started to emerge in the US in the 1870s, when the Missouri State entomologist C. V. Riley and the Illinois State entomologist W. LeBaron began distributing parasitoids to control crop pests in their states. The first international shipment of an insect as a biological control agent was made by Charles V. Riley in 1873, shipping the predatory mites Tyroglyphus phylloxera to France to help fight phylloxera that was destroying grapevines there. The United States Department of Agriculture (USDA) initiated research in classical biological control following the establishment of the Division of Entomology in 1881, with C. V. Riley as Chief. The first importation of a parasitoidal wasp into the United States was that of the braconid Cotesia glomerata in 1883–1884, imported from Europe to control the invasive cabbage white butterfly, Pieris rapae. In 1888–1889 the vedalia beetle, Novius cardinalis, was introduced from Australia to California to control the cottony cushion scale, Icerya purchasi. The scale insect was threatening the newly developed citrus industry in California, but by the end of 1889, the vedalia beetle had already reduced the cottony cushion scale population. This success led to further introductions of beneficial insects into the US.

The first reported case of a classical biological control attempt in Canada involves the parasitoidal wasp Trichogramma minutum. Individuals were caught in New York State and released in Ontario gardens in 1882 by William Saunders, a trained chemist and first Director of the Dominion Experimental Farms, for controlling the invasive currantworm Nematus ribesii. Between 1884 and 1908, the first Dominion Entomologist, James Fletcher, continued introductions of other parasitoids and pathogens for the control of pests in Canada.

In 1905 the USDA initiated its first large-scale biological control program, sending entomologists to Europe and Japan to look for natural enemies of the spongy moth, Lymantria dispar dispar, and the brown-tail moth, Euproctis chrysorrhoea, invasive pests of trees and shrubs. As a result, nine parasitoids (solitary wasps) of the spongy moth, seven of the brown-tail moth, and two predators of both moths became established in the US. Although the spongy moth was not fully controlled by these natural enemies, the frequency, duration, and severity of its outbreaks were reduced and the program was regarded as successful. This program also led to the development of many concepts, principles, and procedures for the implementation of biological control programs.

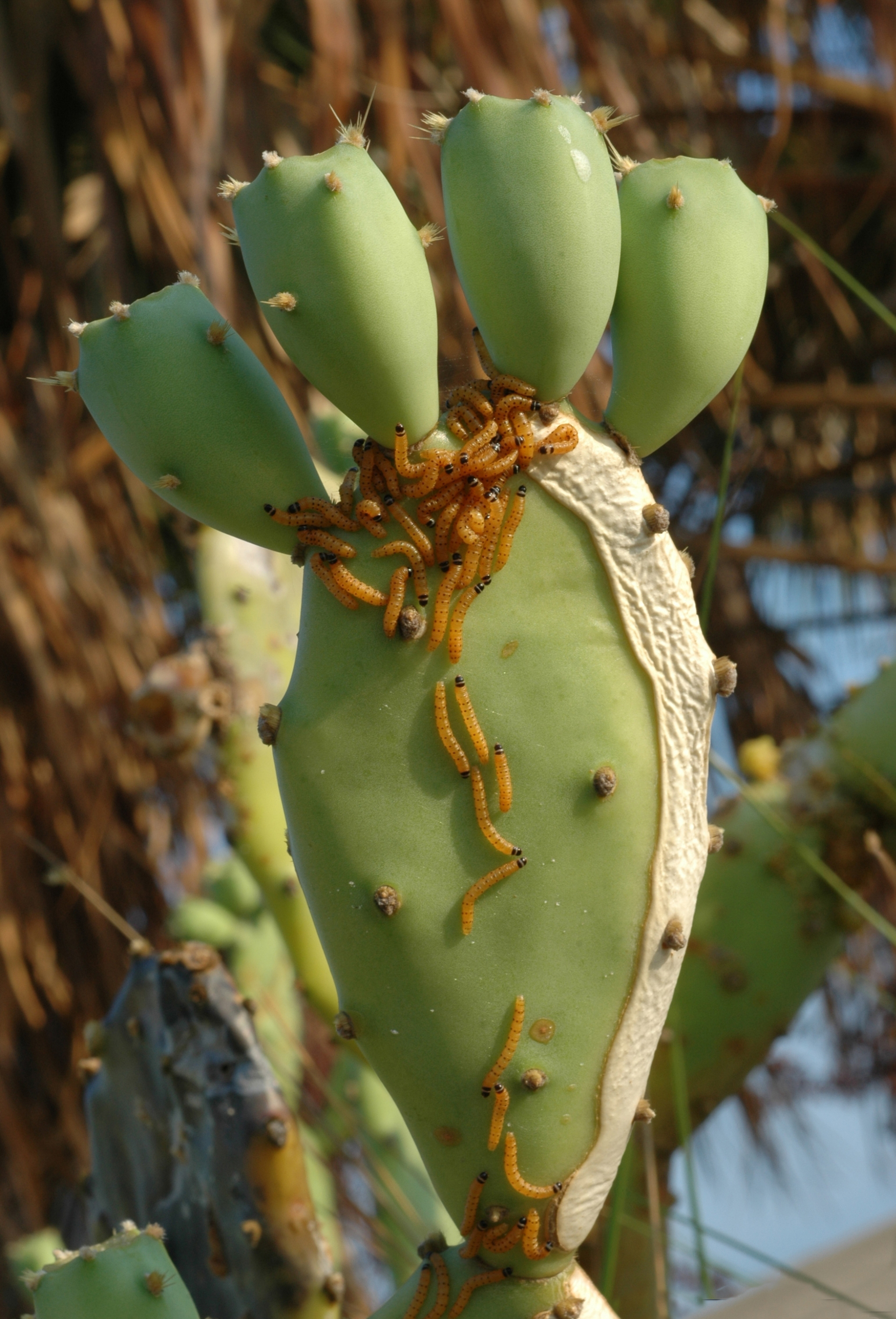
Cactoblastis cactorum larvae feeding on Opuntia prickly pear cacti

The term 'biological control' was first used by Harry Scott Smith at the 1919 meeting of the Pacific Slope Branch of the American Association of Economic Entomologists, in Riverside, California. It was brought into more widespread use by the entomologist Paul H. DeBach (1914–1993) who worked on citrus crop pests throughout his life.

Prickly pear cacti had been introduced into Queensland, Australia as ornamental plants, starting in 1788. They quickly spread to cover over 25 million hectares of Australia by 1920, increasing by 1 million hectares per year. Digging, burning, and crushing all proved ineffective. Two control agents were introduced to help control the spread of the plant, the cactus moth Cactoblastis cactorum, and the scale insect Dactylopius. Between 1926 and 1931, tens of millions of cactus moth eggs were distributed around Queensland, and by 1932, most areas of prickly pear had been destroyed.

== Types ==
There are three basic biological pest control strategies: importation, augmentation and conservation.

=== Importation ===
Importation or classical biological control is the introduction of a pest's natural enemies to a new locale where they do not occur naturally. Early instances were often unofficial and not based on research; some introduced species subsequently became serious pests themselves.

To be most effective at controlling a pest, a biological control agent requires the ability to colonise new areas and keep pace with changes to the habitat over space and time. Control is greatest when the agent can maintain its population during temporary absences of the target species, and can rapidly exploit pest outbreaks as an opportunistic forager.

One of the earliest successes was in controlling Icerya purchasi (cottony cushion scale) in Australia, using a predatory insect Rodolia cardinalis (the vedalia beetle). This success was repeated in California using the beetle and a parasitoidal fly, Cryptochaetum iceryae. Other successful cases include the control of Antonina graminis in Texas by Neodusmetia sangwani in the 1960s.

Damage from Hypera postica, the alfalfa weevil, a serious introduced pest of forage, was substantially reduced by the introduction of natural enemies. 20 years after their introduction the population of weevils in the alfalfa area treated for alfalfa weevil in the Northeastern United States remained 75 percent down.

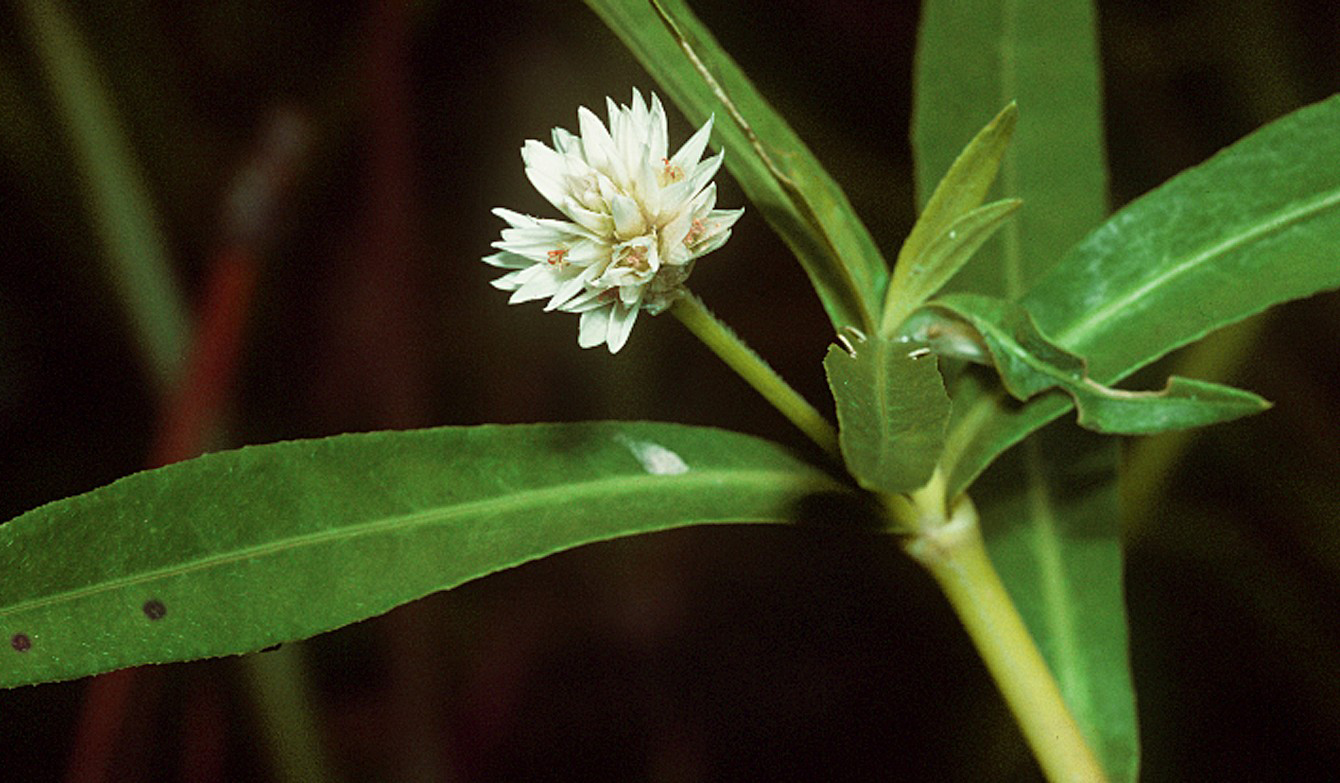
The invasive species Alternanthera philoxeroides (alligator weed) was controlled in Florida (U.S.) by introducing alligator weed flea beetle.

Alligator weed was introduced to the United States from South America. It takes root in shallow water, interfering with navigation, irrigation, and flood control. The alligator weed flea beetle and two other biological controls were released in Florida, greatly reducing the amount of land covered by the plant. Another aquatic weed, the giant salvinia (Salvinia molesta) is a serious pest, covering waterways, reducing water flow and harming native species. Control with the salvinia weevil (Cyrtobagous salviniae) and the salvinia stem-borer moth (Samea multiplicalis) is effective in warm climates, and in Zimbabwe, a 99% control of the weed was obtained over a two-year period.

Small, commercially-reared parasitoidal wasps, Trichogramma ostriniae, provide limited and erratic control of the European corn borer (Ostrinia nubilalis), a serious pest. Careful formulations of the bacterium Bacillus thuringiensis are more effective. The O. nubilalis integrated control releasing Tricogramma brassicae (egg parasitoid) and later Bacillus thuringiensis subs. kurstaki (larvicide effect) reduce pest damages more than insecticide treatments

The population of Levuana iridescens, the Levuana moth, a serious coconut pest in Fiji, was brought under control by a classical biological control program in the 1920s.

=== Augmentation ===
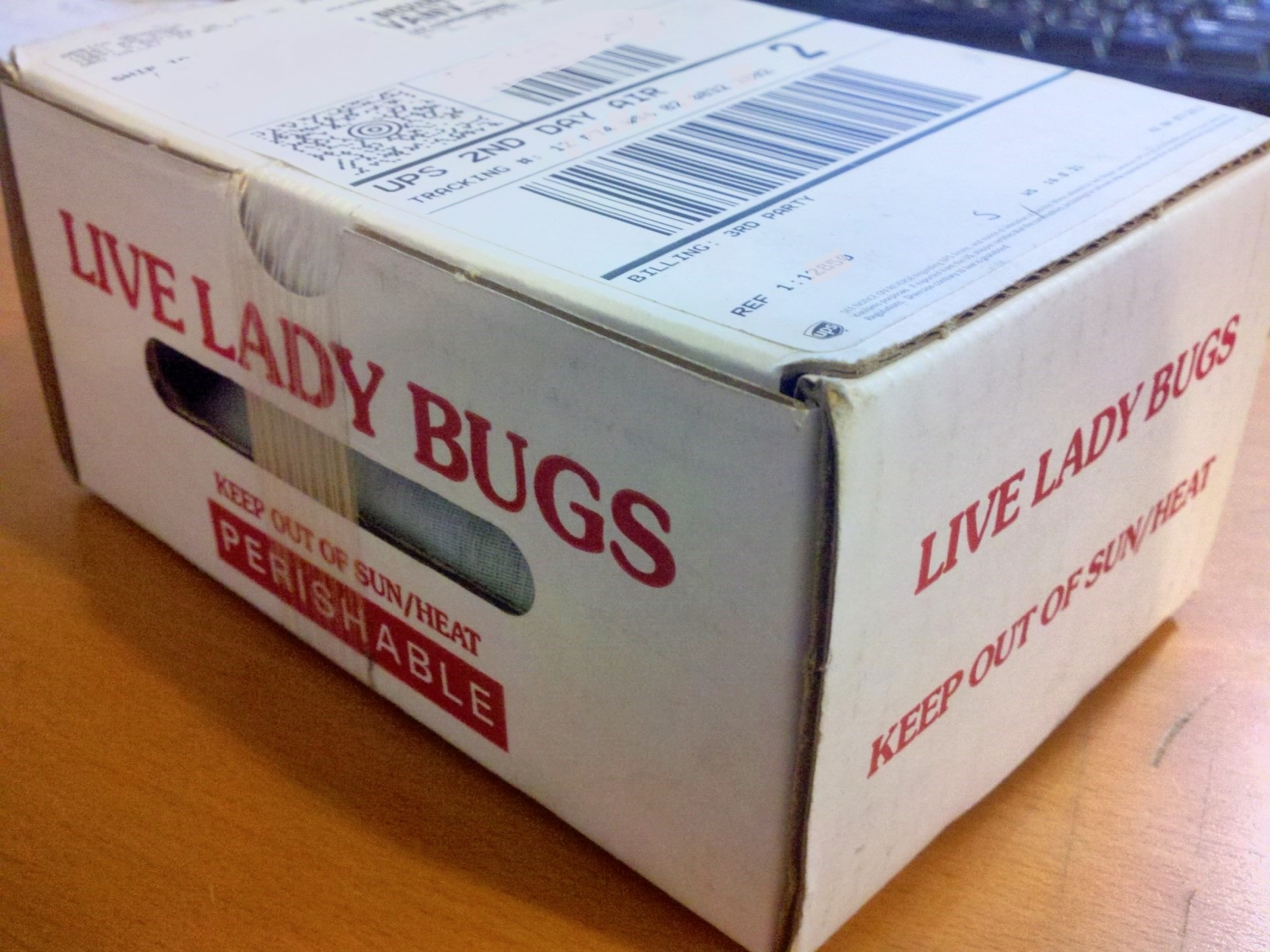
Hippodamia convergens, the convergent lady beetle, is commonly sold for biological control of aphids.

Augmentation involves the supplemental release of natural enemies that occur in a particular area, boosting the naturally occurring populations there. In inoculative release, small numbers of the control agents are released at intervals to allow them to reproduce, in the hope of setting up longer-term control and thus keeping the pest down to a low level, constituting prevention rather than cure. In inundative release, in contrast, large numbers are released in the hope of rapidly reducing a damaging pest population, correcting a problem that has already arisen. Augmentation can be effective, but is not guaranteed to work, and depends on the precise details of the interactions between each pest and control agent.

An example of inoculative release occurs in the horticultural production of several crops in greenhouses. Periodic releases of the parasitoidal wasp, Encarsia formosa, are used to control greenhouse whitefly, while the predatory mite Phytoseiulus persimilis is used for control of the two-spotted spider mite.

The egg parasite Trichogramma is frequently released inundatively to control harmful moths. New way for inundative releases are now introduced i.e. use of drones. Egg parasitoids are able to find the eggs of the target host by means of several cues. Kairomones were found on moth scales. Similarly, Bacillus thuringiensis and other microbial insecticides are used in large enough quantities for a rapid effect. Recommended release rates for Trichogramma in vegetable or field crops range from 5,000 to 200,000 per acre (1 to 50 per square metre) per week according to the level of pest infestation. Similarly, nematodes that kill insects (that are entomopathogenic) are released at rates of millions and even billions per acre for control of certain soil-dwelling insect pests.

=== Conservation ===
The conservation of existing natural enemies in an environment is the third method of biological pest control. Natural enemies are already adapted to the habitat and to the target pest, and their conservation can be simple and cost-effective, as when nectar-producing crop plants are grown in the borders of rice fields. These provide nectar to support parasitoids and predators of planthopper pests and have been demonstrated to be so effective (reducing pest densities by 10- or even 100-fold) that farmers sprayed 70% less insecticides and enjoyed yields boosted by 5%. Predators of aphids were similarly found to be present in tussock grasses by field boundary hedges in England, but they spread too slowly to reach the centers of fields. Control was improved by planting a meter-wide strip of tussock grasses in field centers, enabling aphid predators to overwinter there.

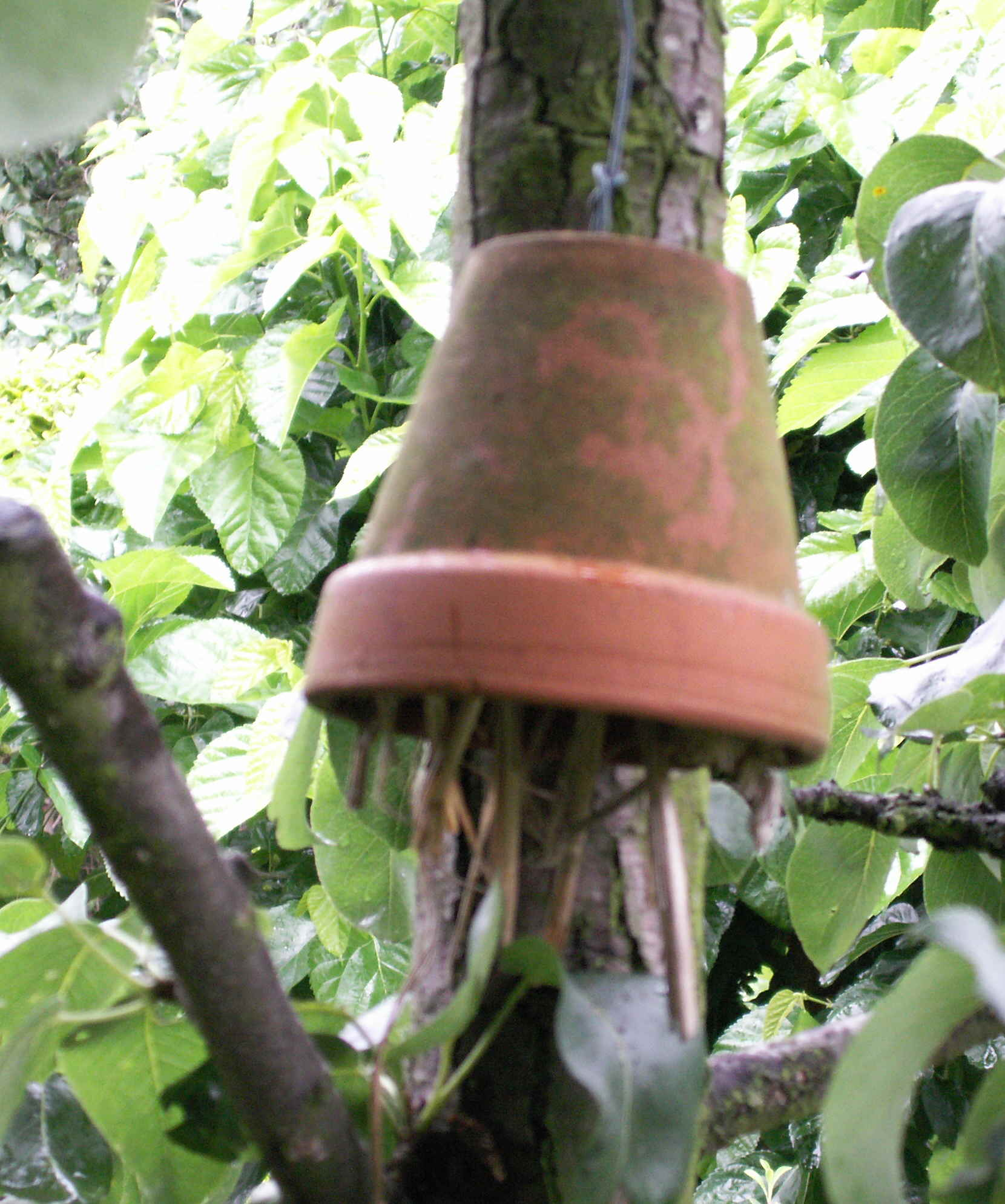
An inverted flowerpot filled with straw to attract earwigs

Cropping systems can be modified to favor natural enemies, a practice sometimes referred to as habitat manipulation. Providing a suitable habitat, such as a shelterbelt, hedgerow, or beetle bank where beneficial insects such as parasitoidal wasps can live and reproduce, can help ensure the survival of populations of natural enemies. Things as simple as leaving a layer of fallen leaves or mulch in place provides a suitable food source for worms and provides a shelter for insects, in turn being a food source for such beneficial mammals as hedgehogs and shrews. Compost piles and stacks of wood can provide shelter for invertebrates and small mammals. Long grass and ponds support amphibians. Not removing dead annuals and non-hardy plants in the autumn allow insects to make use of their hollow stems during winter. In California, prune trees are sometimes planted in grape vineyards to provide an improved overwintering habitat or refuge for a key grape pest parasitoid. The providing of artificial shelters in the form of wooden caskets, boxes or flowerpots is also sometimes undertaken, particularly in gardens, to make a cropped area more attractive to natural enemies. For example, earwigs are natural predators that can be encouraged in gardens by hanging upside-down flowerpots filled with straw or wood wool. Green lacewings can be encouraged by using plastic bottles with an open bottom and a roll of cardboard inside. Birdhouses enable insectivorous birds to nest; the most useful birds can be attracted by choosing an opening just large enough for the desired species.

In cotton production, the replacement of broad-spectrum insecticides with selective control measures such as Bt cotton can create a more favorable environment for natural enemies of cotton pests due to reduced insecticide exposure risk. Such predators or parasitoids can control pests not affected by the Bt protein. Reduced prey quality and abundance associated with increased control from Bt cotton can also indirectly decrease natural enemy populations in some cases, but the percentage of pests eaten or parasitized in Bt and non-Bt cotton are often similar.

== Biological control agents ==
=== Predators ===
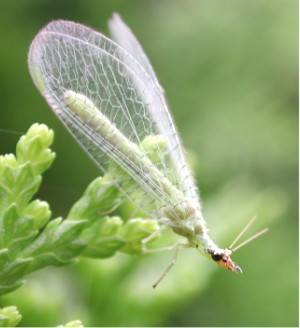
Predatory lacewings are available from biocontrol dealers.

Predators are mainly free-living species that directly consume a large number of prey during their whole lifetime. Given that many major crop pests are insects, many of the predators used in biological control are insectivorous species. Lady beetles, and in particular their larvae which are active between May and July in the northern hemisphere, are voracious predators of aphids, and also consume mites, scale insects and small caterpillars. The spotted lady beetle (Coleomegilla maculata) is also able to feed on the eggs and larvae of the Colorado potato beetle (Leptinotarsa decemlineata).

The larvae of many hoverfly species principally feed upon aphids, one larva devouring up to 400 in its lifetime. Their effectiveness in commercial crops has not been studied.

The running crab spider Philodromus cespitum also prey heavily on aphids, and act as a biological control agent in European fruit orchards.

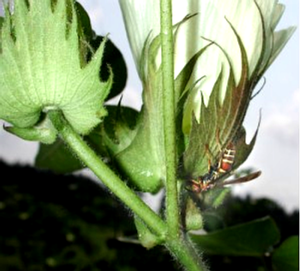
Predatory Polistes wasp searching for bollworms or other caterpillars on a cotton plant

Several species of entomopathogenic nematode are important predators of insect and other invertebrate pests. Entomopathogenic nematodes form a stress–resistant stage known as the infective juvenile. These spread in the soil and infect suitable insect hosts. Upon entering the insect they move to the hemolymph where they recover from their stagnated state of development and release their bacterial symbionts. The bacterial symbionts reproduce and release toxins, which then kill the host insect. Phasmarhabditis hermaphrodita is a microscopic nematode that kills slugs. Its complex life cycle includes a free-living, infective stage in the soil where it becomes associated with a pathogenic bacteria such as Moraxella osloensis. The nematode enters the slug through the posterior mantle region, thereafter feeding and reproducing inside, but it is the bacteria that kill the slug. The nematode is available commercially in Europe and is applied by watering onto moist soil. Entomopathogenic nematodes have a limited shelf life because of their limited resistance to high temperature and dry conditions. The type of soil they are applied to may also limit their effectiveness.

Species used to control spider mites include the predatory mites Phytoseiulus persimilis, Neoseilus californicus, and Amblyseius cucumeris, the predatory midge Feltiella acarisuga, and a ladybird Stethorus punctillum. The bug Orius insidiosus has been successfully used against the two-spotted spider mite and the western flower thrips (Frankliniella occidentalis).

Predators including Cactoblastis cactorum (mentioned above) can also be used to destroy invasive plant species. As another example, the poison hemlock moth (Agonopterix alstroemeriana) can be used to control poison hemlock (Conium maculatum). During its larval stage, the moth strictly consumes its host plant, poison hemlock, and can exist at hundreds of larvae per individual host plant, destroying large swathes of the hemlock.

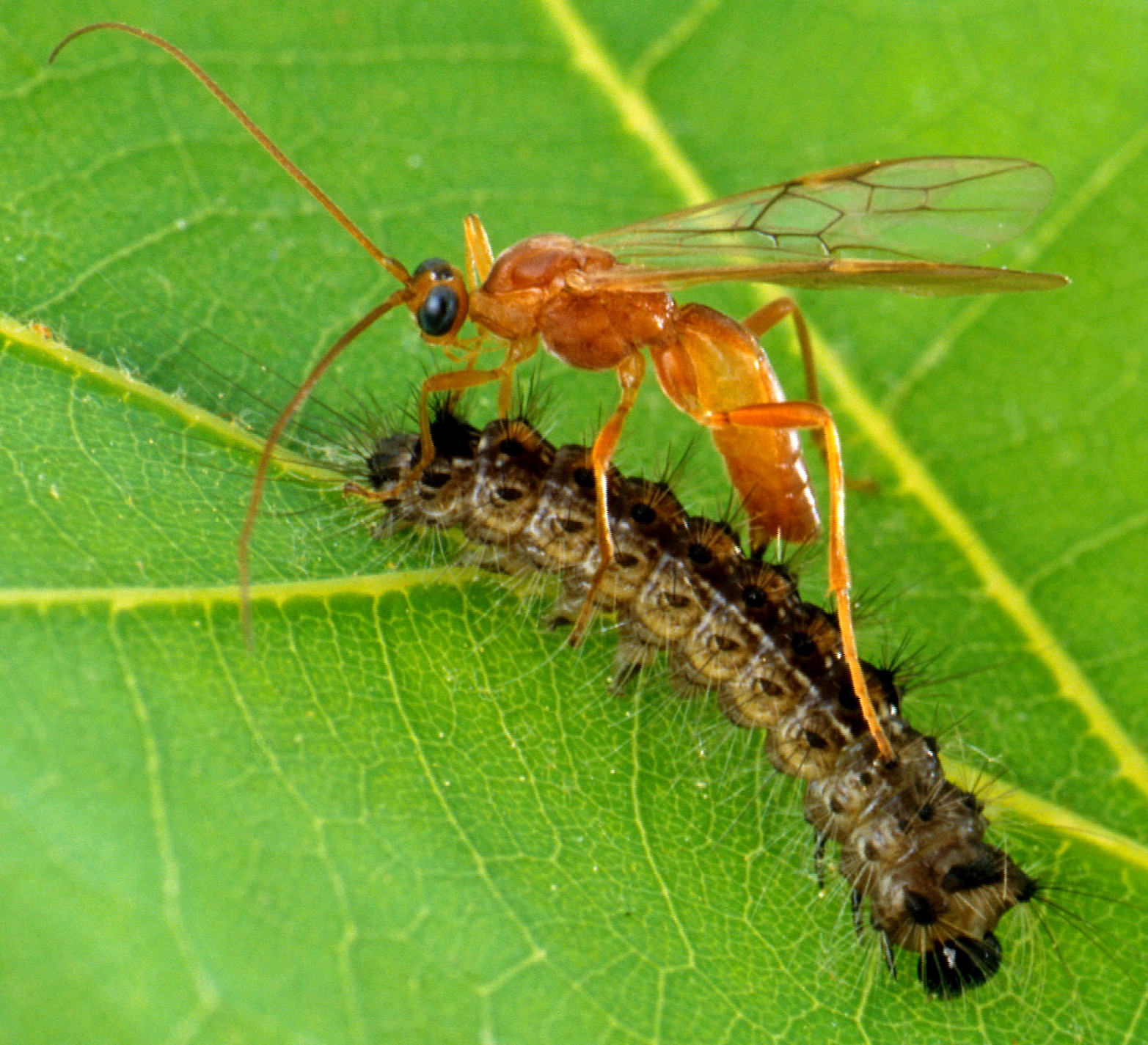
The parasitoid wasp Aleiodes indiscretus parasitizing a spongy moth caterpillar, a serious pest of forestry

For rodent pests, farm cats are effective biological control when used in conjunction with reduction of places where pests can hide. Cats are effective at preventing rodent "population explosions", but not for eliminating pre-existing severe infestations. Barn owls are sometimes used to control rodents. Although there are no quantitative studies of their effectiveness, they are known rodent predators that can be used in addition to or instead of cats; they can be encouraged into an area with nest boxes.

In Honduras, where the mosquito Aedes aegypti was transmitting dengue fever and other infectious diseases, biological control was attempted by a community action plan; copepods, baby turtles, and juvenile tilapia were added to the wells and tanks where the mosquito breeds and the mosquito larvae were eliminated.

Even amongst arthropods usually thought of as obligate predators of animals, floral food sources (nectar and to a lesser degree pollen) are often useful adjunct sources. Adult Adalia bipunctata (a predator and common biocontrol of Ephestia kuehniella) can survive on flowers but never completes its life cycle. Floral resources (and an imitation, sugar water) increase predator longevity and fecundity. Thus biocontrol population maintenance – and success – may depend on nearby flowers.

=== Parasitoids ===
Parasitoids lay their eggs on or in the body of an insect host, which is then used as a food for developing larvae. The host is ultimately killed. Most insect parasitoids are wasps or flies, and many have a very narrow host range. The most important groups are the ichneumonid wasps, which mainly use caterpillars as hosts; braconid wasps, which attack caterpillars and a wide range of other insects including aphids; chalcidoid wasps, which parasitize eggs and larvae of many insect species; and tachinid flies, which parasitize a wide range of insects including caterpillars, beetle adults and larvae, and true bugs. Parasitoids are most effective at reducing pest populations when their host organisms have limited refuges to hide from them.

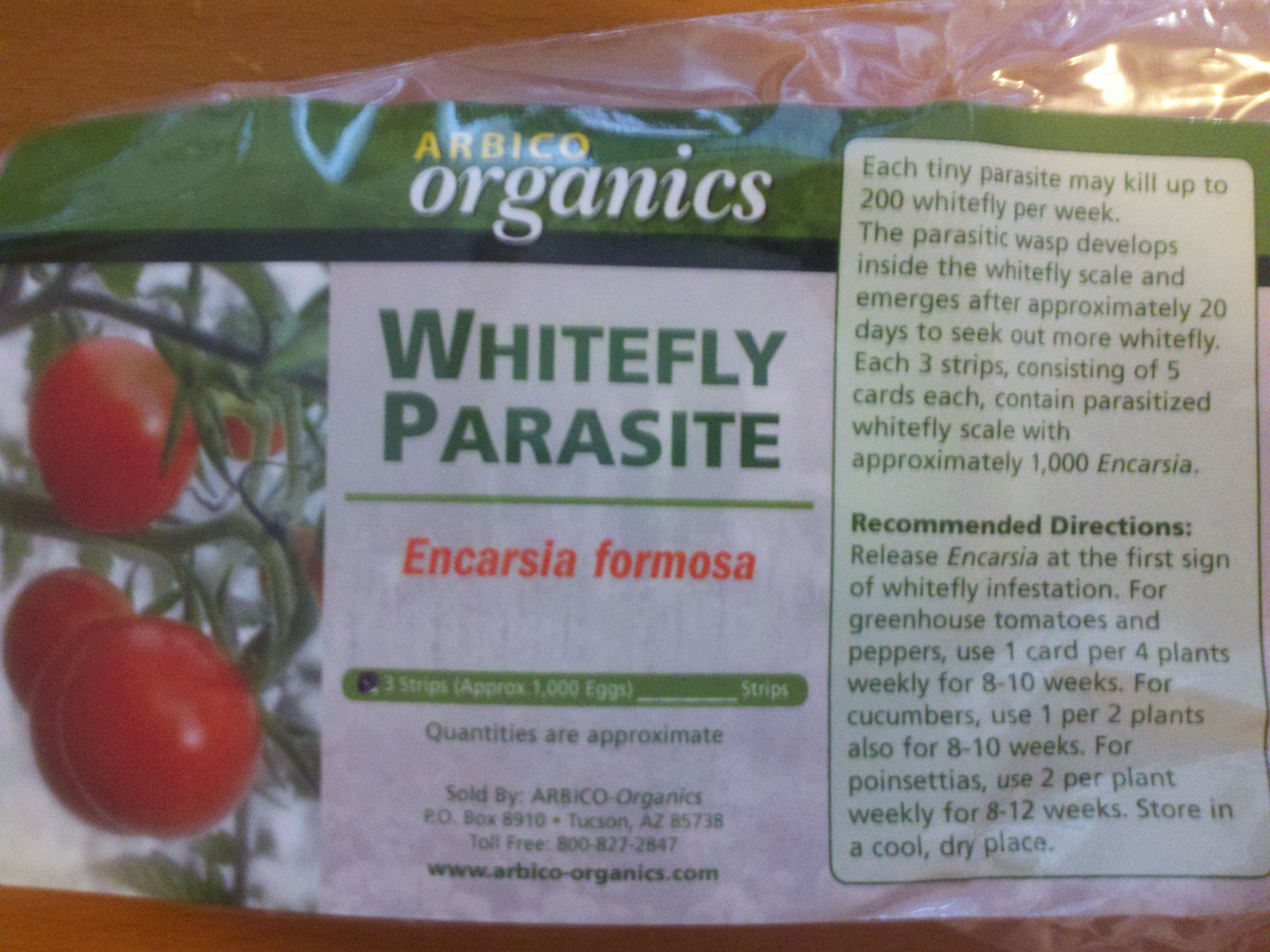
Encarsia formosa, widely used in greenhouse horticulture, was one of the first biological control agents developed.

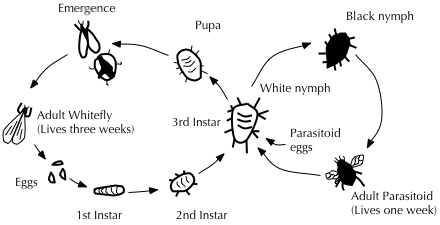
Life cycles of greenhouse whitefly and its parasitoid wasp Encarsia formosa

Parasitoids are among the most widely used biological control agents. Commercially, there are two types of rearing systems: short-term daily output with high production of parasitoids per day, and long-term, low daily output systems. In most instances, production will need to be matched with the appropriate release dates when susceptible host species at a suitable phase of development will be available. Larger production facilities produce on a yearlong basis, whereas some facilities produce only seasonally. Rearing facilities are usually a significant distance from where the agents are to be used in the field, and transporting the parasitoids from the point of production to the point of use can pose problems. Shipping conditions can be too hot, and even vibrations from planes or trucks can adversely affect parasitoids.

Encarsia formosa is a small parasitoid wasp attacking whiteflies, sap-feeding insects which can cause wilting and black sooty moulds in glasshouse vegetable and ornamental crops. It is most effective when dealing with low level infestations, giving protection over a long period of time. The wasp lays its eggs in young whitefly 'scales', turning them black as the parasite larvae pupate. Gonatocerus ashmeadi (Hymenoptera: Mymaridae) has been introduced to control the glassy-winged sharpshooter Homalodisca vitripennis (Hemiptera: Cicadellidae) in French Polynesia and has successfully controlled ~95% of the pest density.

The eastern spruce budworm is an example of a destructive insect in fir and spruce forests. Birds are a natural form of biological control, but the Trichogramma minutum, a species of parasitic wasp, has been investigated as an alternative to more controversial chemical controls.

There are a number of recent studies pursuing sustainable methods for controlling urban cockroaches using parasitic wasps. Since most cockroaches remain in the sewer system and sheltered areas which are inaccessible to insecticides, employing active-hunter wasps is a strategy to try and reduce their populations.

=== Pathogens ===
Pathogenic micro-organisms include bacteria, fungi, and viruses. They kill or debilitate their host and are relatively host-specific. Various microbial insect diseases occur naturally, but may also be used as biological pesticides. When naturally occurring, these outbreaks are density-dependent in that they generally only occur as insect populations become denser. The use of pathogens against aquatic weeds began in 1972 with a proposal by F. W. Zettler and T. E. Freeman. Pathogens are sometimes intentionally dispersed using a pollinating insect as an entomovector.

==== Bacteria ====
Bacteria used for biological control infect insects via their digestive tracts, so they offer only limited options for controlling insects with sucking mouth parts such as aphids and scale insects. Bacillus thuringiensis, a soil-dwelling bacterium, is the most widely applied species of bacteria used for biological control, with at least four sub-species used against Lepidopteran (moth, butterfly), Coleopteran (beetle) and Dipteran (true fly) insect pests. The bacterium is available to organic farmers in sachets of dried spores which are mixed with water and sprayed onto vulnerable plants such as brassicas and fruit trees. Genes from B. thuringiensis have also been incorporated into transgenic crops, making the plants express some of the bacterium's toxins, which are proteins. These confer resistance to insect pests and thus reduce the necessity for pesticide use. If pests develop resistance to the toxins in these crops, B. thuringiensis will become useless in organic farming also. The bacterium Paenibacillus popilliae which causes milky spore disease has been found useful in the control of Japanese beetle, killing the larvae. It is very specific to its host species and is harmless to vertebrates and other invertebrates.

Bacillus spp., (Note: p. 94-5, II. Biocontrol Modes of Action) fluorescent Pseudomonads, and Streptomycetes are controls of various fungal pathogens.

The largest-ever deployment of Wolbachia-infected A. aegypti mosquitoes reduced dengue incidence by 94–97% in the Colombian cities of Bello, Medellín, and Itagüí. The project was executed by non-profit World Mosquito Program (WMP). Wolbachia prevents mosquitos from transmitting viruses such as dengue and zika. The insects pass the bacteria on to their offspring. The project covered a combined area of 135 square kilometres (52 sq mi), home to 3.3 million people. Most of the project area reached the target of infecting 60% of local mosquitoes. The technique is not endorsed by WHO.

==== Fungi ====
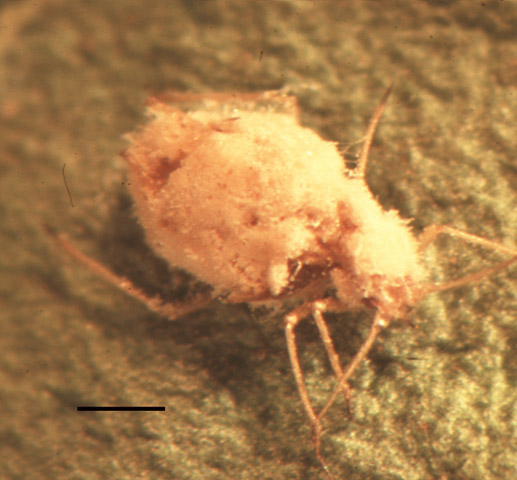
Green peach aphid, a pest in its own right and a vector of plant viruses, killed by the fungus Pandora neoaphidis (Zygomycota: Entomophthorales) Scale bar = 0.3 mm.

Entomopathogenic fungi, which cause disease in insects, include at least 14 species that attack aphids. Beauveria bassiana is mass-produced and used to manage a wide variety of insect pests including whiteflies, thrips, aphids and weevils. Lecanicillium spp. are deployed against white flies, thrips and aphids. Metarhizium spp. are used against pests including beetles, locusts and other grasshoppers, Hemiptera, and spider mites. Isaria fumosorosea (formerly known as Paecilomyces fumosoroseus) is effective against white flies, thrips and aphids; Purpureocillium lilacinum (formerly known as Paecilomyces lilacinus) is used against root-knot nematodes, and 89 Trichoderma species against certain plant pathogens. Trichoderma viride has been used against Dutch elm disease, and has shown some effect in suppressing silver leaf, a disease of stone fruits caused by the pathogenic fungus Chondrostereum purpureum.

Pathogenic fungi may be controlled by other fungi, or bacteria or yeasts, such as: Gliocladium spp., mycoparasitic Pythium spp., binucleate types of Rhizoctonia spp., and Laetisaria spp.

The fungi Cordyceps and Metacordyceps are deployed against a wide spectrum of arthropods. Entomophaga is effective against pests such as the green peach aphid.

Several members of Chytridiomycota and Blastocladiomycota have been explored as agents of biological control. From Chytridiomycota, Synchytrium solstitiale is being considered as a control agent of the yellow star thistle (Centaurea solstitialis) in the United States.

==== Viruses ====
Baculoviruses are specific to individual insect host species and have been shown to be useful in viral biological pest control. For example, the Lymantria dispar multicapsid nuclear polyhedrosis virus has been used to spray large areas of forest in North America where larvae of the spongy moth are causing serious defoliation. The moth larvae are killed by the virus they have eaten and die, the disintegrating cadavers leaving virus particles on the foliage to infect other larvae.

A mammalian virus, the rabbit haemorrhagic disease virus was introduced to Australia to attempt to control the European rabbit populations there. It escaped from quarantine and spread across the country, killing large numbers of rabbits. Very young animals survived, passing immunity to their offspring in due course and eventually producing a virus-resistant population. Introduction into New Zealand in the 1990s was similarly successful at first, but a decade later, immunity had developed and populations had returned to pre-RHD levels.

RNA mycoviruses are controls of various fungal pathogens.

==== Oomycota ====
Lagenidium giganteum is a water-borne mold that parasitizes the larval stage of mosquitoes. When applied to water, the motile spores avoid unsuitable host species and search out suitable mosquito larval hosts. This mold has the advantages of a dormant phase, resistant to desiccation, with slow-release characteristics over several years. Unfortunately, it is susceptible to many chemicals used in mosquito abatement programmes.

=== Competitors ===
The legume vine Mucuna pruriens is used in the countries of Benin and Vietnam as a biological control for problematic Imperata cylindrica grass: the vine is extremely vigorous and suppresses neighbouring plants by out-competing them for space and light. Mucuna pruriens is said not to be invasive outside its cultivated area. Desmodium uncinatum can be used in push-pull farming to stop the parasitic plant, witchweed (Striga).

The Australian bush fly, Musca vetustissima, is a major nuisance pest in Australia, but native decomposers found in Australia are not adapted to feeding on cow dung, which is where bush flies breed. Therefore, the Australian Dung Beetle Project (1965–1985), led by George Bornemissza of the Commonwealth Scientific and Industrial Research Organisation, released forty-nine species of dung beetle, to reduce the amount of dung and therefore also the potential breeding sites of the fly.

=== Combined use of parasitoids and pathogens ===
In cases of massive and severe infection of invasive pests, techniques of pest control are often used in combination. An example is the emerald ash borer, Agrilus planipennis, an invasive beetle from China, which has destroyed tens of millions of ash trees in its introduced range in North America. As part of the campaign against it, from 2003 American scientists and the Chinese Academy of Forestry searched for its natural enemies in the wild, leading to the discovery of several parasitoid wasps, namely Tetrastichus planipennisi, a gregarious larval endoparasitoid, Oobius agrili, a solitary, parthenogenic egg parasitoid, and Spathius agrili, a gregarious larval ectoparasitoid. These have been introduced and released into the United States of America as a possible biological control of the emerald ash borer. Initial results for Tetrastichus planipennisi have shown promise, and it is now being released along with Beauveria bassiana, a fungal pathogen with known insecticidal properties.

=== Secondary plants ===
In addition, biological pest control sometimes makes use of plant defenses to reduce crop damage by herbivores. Techniques include polyculture, the planting together of two or more species such as a primary crop and a secondary plant, which may also be a crop. This can allow the secondary plant's defensive chemicals to protect the crop planted with it.

== Target pests ==
=== Fungal pests ===
Botrytis cinerea on lettuce, by Fusarium spp. and Penicillium claviforme, on grape and strawberry by Trichoderma spp., on strawberry by Cladosporium herbarum, on Chinese cabbage by Bacillus brevis, and on various other crops by various yeasts and bacteria. Sclerotinia sclerotiorum by several fungal biocontrols. Fungal pod infection of snap bean by Trichoderma hamatum if before or concurrent with infection. Cryphonectria parasitica, Gaeumannomyces graminis, Sclerotinia spp., and Ophiostoma novo-ulmi by viruses. Various powdery mildews and rusts by various Bacillus spp. and fluorescent Pseudomonads. Colletotrichum orbiculare will suppress further infection by itself if manipulated to produce plant-induced systemic resistance by infected the lowest leaf.

== Difficulties ==
Many of the most important pests are exotic, invasive species that severely impact agriculture, horticulture, forestry, and urban environments. They tend to arrive without their co-evolved parasites, pathogens and predators, and by escaping from these, populations may soar. Importing the natural enemies of these pests may seem a logical move but this may have unintended consequences; regulations may be ineffective and there may be unanticipated effects on biodiversity, and the adoption of the techniques may prove challenging because of a lack of knowledge among farmers and growers.

=== Side effects ===
Biological control can affect biodiversity through predation, parasitism, pathogenicity, competition, or other attacks on non-target species. An introduced control does not always target only the intended pest species; it can also target native species. In Hawaii during the 1940s parasitic wasps were introduced to control a lepidopteran pest and the wasps are still found there today. This may have a negative impact on the native ecosystem; however, host range and impacts need to be studied before declaring their impact on the environment.

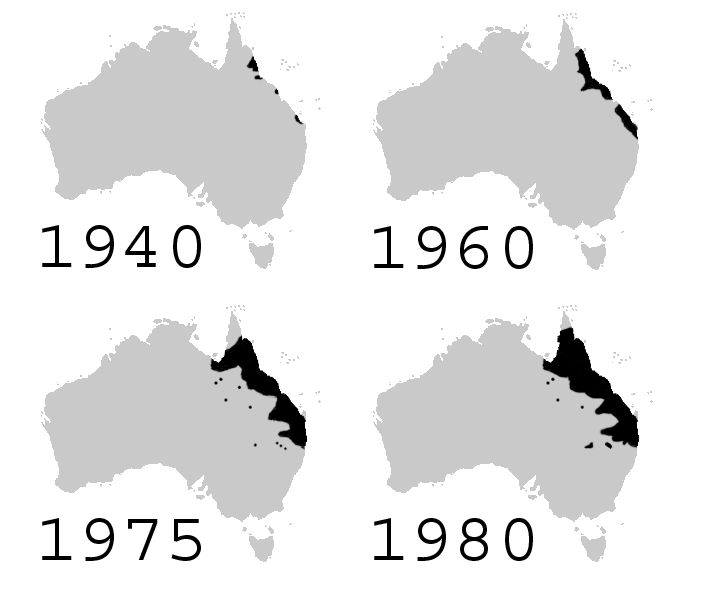
Cane toad (introduced into Australia 1935) spread from 1940 to 1980: it was ineffective as a control agent. Its distribution has continued to widen since 1980.

Vertebrate animals tend to be generalist feeders, and seldom make good biological control agents; many of the classic cases of "biocontrol gone awry" involve vertebrates. For example, the cane toad (Rhinella marina) was intentionally introduced to Australia to control the greyback cane beetle (Dermolepida albohirtum), and other pests of sugar cane. 102 toads were obtained from Hawaii and bred in captivity to increase their numbers until they were released into the sugar cane fields of the tropic north in 1935. It was later discovered that the toads could not jump very high and so were unable to eat the cane beetles which stayed on the upper stalks of the cane plants. However, the toad thrived by feeding on other insects and soon spread very rapidly; it took over native amphibian habitat and brought foreign disease to native toads and frogs, dramatically reducing their populations. Also, when it is threatened or handled, the cane toad releases poison from parotoid glands on its shoulders; native Australian species such as goannas, tiger snakes, dingos and northern quolls that attempted to eat the toad were harmed or killed. However, there has been some recent evidence that native predators are adapting, both physiologically and through changing their behaviour, so in the long run, their populations may recover.

Rhinocyllus conicus, a seed-feeding weevil, was introduced to North America to control exotic musk thistle (Carduus nutans) and Canadian thistle (Cirsium arvense). However, the weevil also attacks native thistles, harming such species as the endemic Platte thistle (Cirsium neomexicanum) by selecting larger plants (which reduced the gene pool), reducing seed production and ultimately threatening the species' survival. Similarly, the weevil Larinus planus was also used to try to control the Canadian thistle, but it damaged other thistles as well. This included one species classified as threatened.

The small Asian mongoose (Herpestus javanicus) was introduced to Hawaii in order to control the rat population. However, the mongoose was diurnal, and the rats emerged at night; the mongoose, therefore, preyed on the endemic birds of Hawaii, especially their eggs, more often than it ate the rats, and now both rats and mongooses threaten the birds. This introduction was undertaken without understanding the consequences of such an action. No regulations existed at the time, and more careful evaluation should prevent such releases now.

The sturdy and prolific eastern mosquitofish (Gambusia holbrooki) is a native of the southeastern United States and was introduced around the world in the 1930s and '40s to feed on mosquito larvae and thus combat malaria. However, it has thrived at the expense of local species, causing a decline of endemic fish and frogs through competition for food resources, as well as through eating their eggs and larvae. In Australia, control of the mosquitofish is the subject of discussion; in 1989 researchers A. H. Arthington and L. L. Lloyd stated that "biological population control is well beyond present capabilities".

=== Grower education ===
A potential obstacle to the adoption of biological pest control measures is that growers may prefer to stay with the familiar use of pesticides. However, pesticides have undesired effects, including the development of resistance among pests, and the destruction of natural enemies; these may in turn enable outbreaks of pests of other species than the ones originally targeted, and on crops at a distance from those treated with pesticides. One method of increasing grower adoption of biocontrol methods involves letting them learn by doing, for example showing them simple field experiments, enabling them to observe the live predation of pests, or demonstrations of parasitised pests. In the Philippines, early-season sprays against leaf folder caterpillars were common practice, but growers were asked to follow a 'rule of thumb' of not spraying against leaf folders for the first 30 days after transplanting; participation in this resulted in a reduction of insecticide use by 1/3 and a change in grower perception of insecticide use.

== Related techniques ==
Related to biological pest control is the technique of introducing sterile individuals into the native population of some organism. This technique is widely practised with insects: a large number of males sterilized by radiation are released into the environment, which proceed to compete with the native males for females. Those females that copulate with the sterile males will lay infertile eggs, resulting in a decrease in the size of the population. Over time, with repeated introductions of sterile males, this could result in a significant decrease in the size of the organism's population. A similar technique has recently been applied to weeds using irradiated pollen, resulting in deformed seeds that do not sprout.

== See also ==
- Chitosan
- International Organization for Biological Control
- Nature-based solutions
- Organic farming
- Sustainable agriculture
