= Samea purpurascens =

Scientific classification
- Kingdom: Animalia
- Phylum: Arthropoda
- Class: Insecta
- Order: Lepidoptera
- Family: Crambidae
- Genus: Samea
- Species: S. purpurascens

Binomial name
- Samea purpurascens Moore, 1877

Species of moth

Samea purpurascens is a moth in the family Crambidae. It is found in India (Andamans).
