= Samea figuralis =

Scientific classification
- Kingdom: Animalia
- Phylum: Arthropoda
- Class: Insecta
- Order: Lepidoptera
- Family: Crambidae
- Genus: Samea
- Species: S. figuralis

Binomial name
- Samea figuralis Walker in Chapman, 1869

Species of moth

Samea figuralis is a moth in the family Crambidae. It was described by Francis Walker in 1869. It is found in the Democratic Republic of the Congo.
