= Samea mictalis =

Scientific classification
- Kingdom: Animalia
- Phylum: Arthropoda
- Class: Insecta
- Order: Lepidoptera
- Family: Crambidae
- Genus: Samea
- Species: S. mictalis

Binomial name
- Samea mictalis Hampson, 1912

Species of moth

Samea mictalis is a moth in the family Crambidae. It was described by George Hampson in 1912. It is found in Tabasco in Mexico, Panama and Puerto Rico.
