= Samea atrichonalis =

Scientific classification
- Kingdom: Animalia
- Phylum: Arthropoda
- Class: Insecta
- Order: Lepidoptera
- Family: Crambidae
- Genus: Samea
- Species: S. atrichonalis

Binomial name
- Samea atrichonalis Amsel, 1956

Species of moth

Samea atrichonalis is a moth in the family Crambidae. It is found in Venezuela.
