= Samea druchachalis =

Scientific classification
- Kingdom: Animalia
- Phylum: Arthropoda
- Class: Insecta
- Order: Lepidoptera
- Family: Crambidae
- Genus: Samea
- Species: S. druchachalis

Binomial name
- Samea druchachalis Dyar, 1924

Synonyms
- Samea druchalalis

Species of moth

Samea druchachalis is a moth in the family Crambidae. It is found in Mexico (Colima, Sinaloa) and the southern United States, where it has been recorded from Florida and Texas.

Adults are on wing from May to September in Florida and have been recorded in November in Texas.
