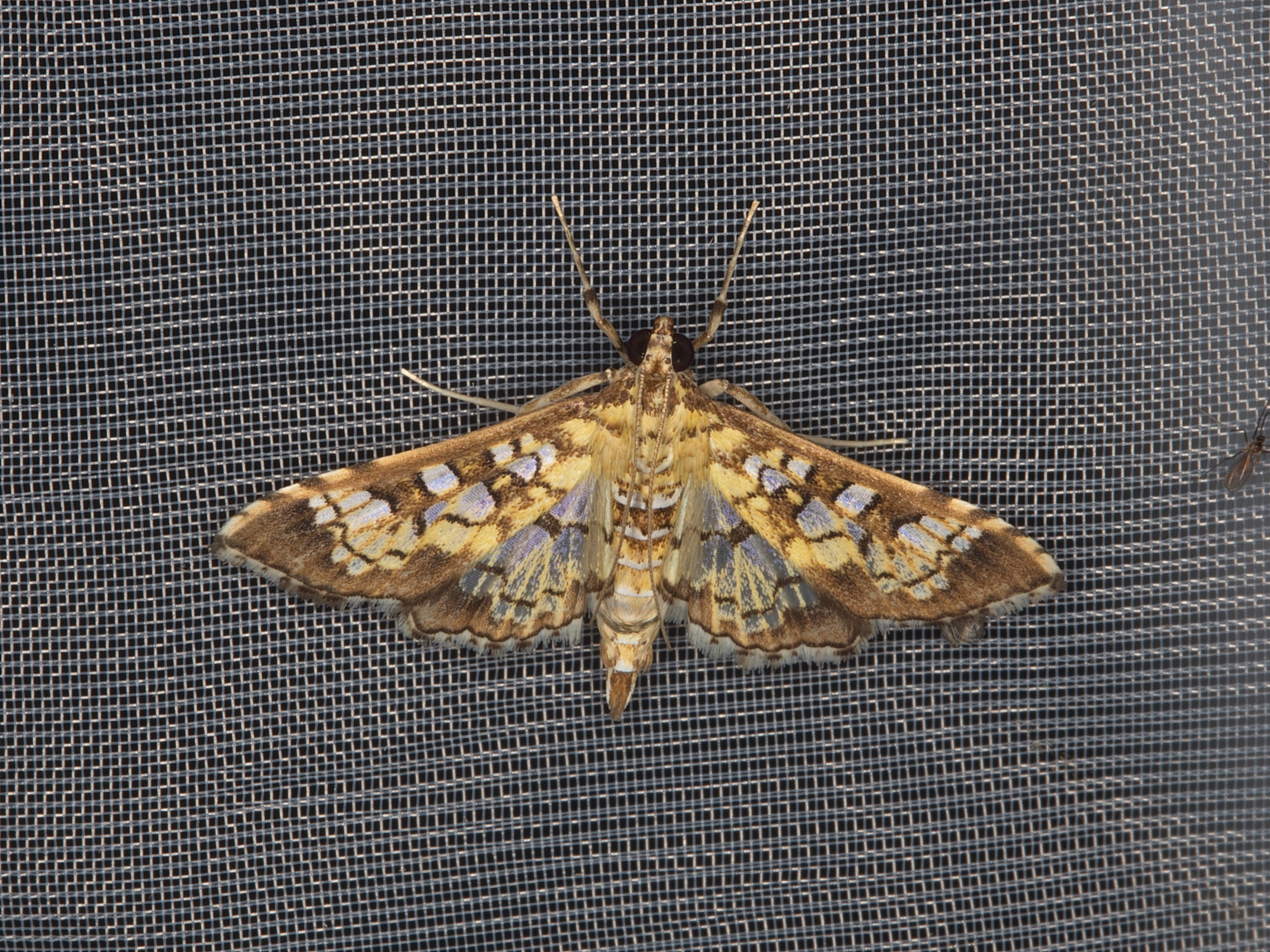
- Samea ecclesialis

Scientific classification
- Kingdom: Animalia
- Phylum: Arthropoda
- Clade: Pancrustacea
- Class: Insecta
- Order: Lepidoptera
- Family: Crambidae
- Subfamily: Spilomelinae
- Genus: Samea; Guenée, 1854

Synonyms
- Pterygisus Butler, 1886; Isopteryx Guenée, 1854

= Samea =

Genus of moths

Samea is a genus of moths of the family Crambidae described by Achille Guenée in 1854.

== Species ==
- Samea alophalis Hampson, 1912
- Samea antisema (Meyrick, 1886)
- Samea atrichonalis Amsel, 1956
- Samea baccatalis (Hulst, 1892)
- Samea bipunctalis Warren, 1888
- Samea borboraula (Meyrick, 1936)
- Samea calligraphalis (Snellen, 1892)
- Samea calonalis Walker, 1859
- Samea carettalis Schaus, 1940
- Samea castoralis (Walker, 1859)
- Samea coffea Landry, 2016 (from Galápagos Islands)
- Samea choristalis Hampson, 1912
- Samea conjunctalis Möschler, 1890
- Samea delicata Kaye, 1923
- Samea druchachalis Dyar, 1924
- Samea ecclesialis Guenée, 1854
- Samea figuralis Walker in Chapman, 1969
- Samea forsteri (Amsel, 1956)
- Samea mictalis Hampson, 1912
- Samea multiplicalis (Guenée, 1854)
- Samea obliteralis Walker, 1866
- Samea purpurascens Moore, 1877
- Samea similalis Hampson, 1912
- Samea sylvialis (Walker, 1859)

== Former species ==
- Samea fumidalis Leech, 1889
- Samea nicaeusalis (Walker, 1859)
