= Samea carettalis =

Scientific classification
- Kingdom: Animalia
- Phylum: Arthropoda
- Class: Insecta
- Order: Lepidoptera
- Family: Crambidae
- Genus: Samea
- Species: S. carettalis

Binomial name
- Samea carettalis Schaus, 1940

Species of moth

Samea carettalis is a moth in the family Crambidae. It is found in Jamaica, Puerto Rico and Cuba.
