= Samea castoralis =

Scientific classification
- Kingdom: Animalia
- Phylum: Arthropoda
- Class: Insecta
- Order: Lepidoptera
- Family: Crambidae
- Genus: Samea
- Species: S. castoralis

Binomial name
- Samea castoralis (Walker, 1859)

Synonyms
- Botys castoralis Walker, 1859

Species of moth

Samea castoralis is a moth in the family Crambidae. It is found on Borneo and in the Philippines, Cambodia, China and India.
