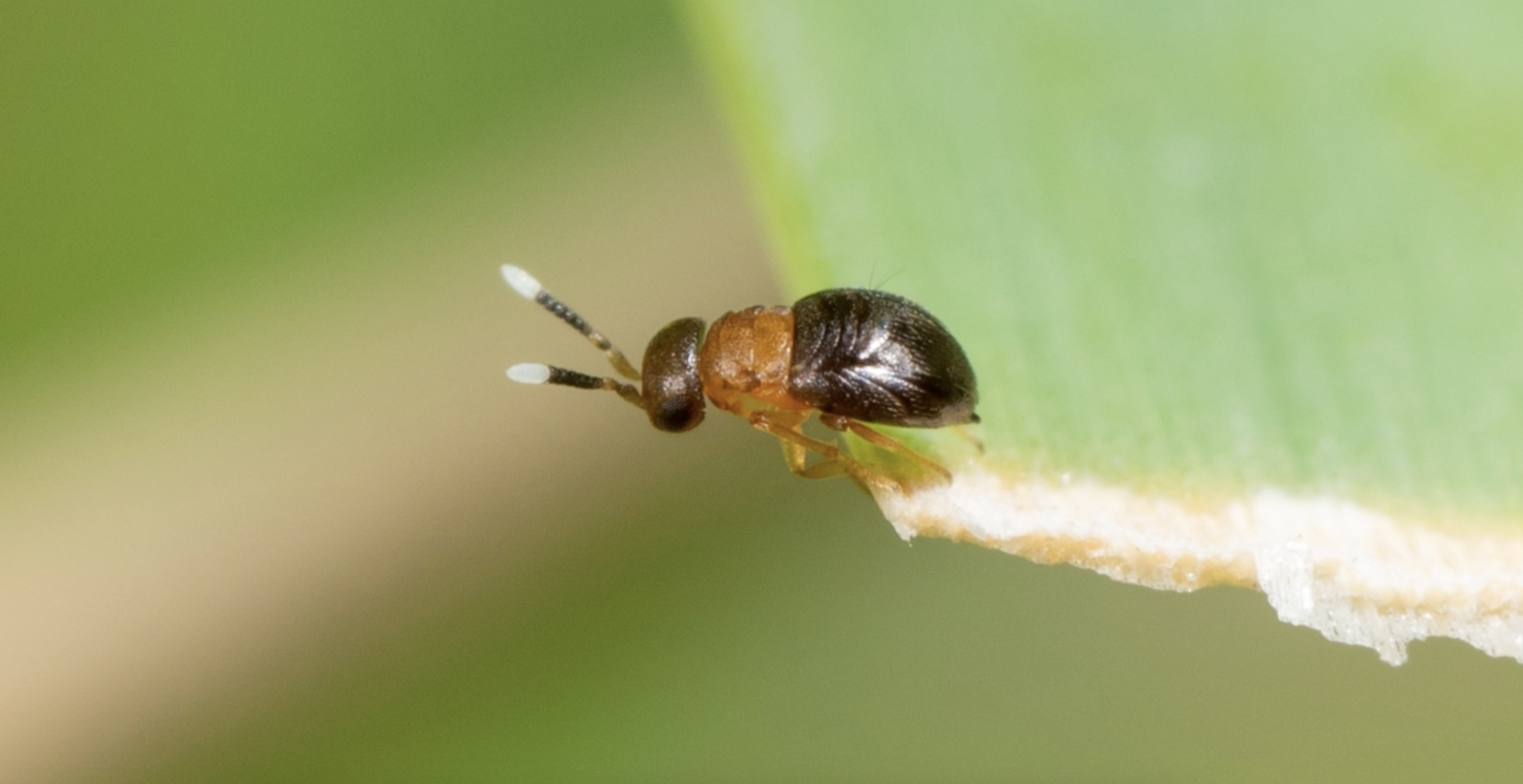

Scientific classification
- Kingdom: Animalia
- Phylum: Arthropoda
- Clade: Pancrustacea
- Class: Insecta
- Order: Hymenoptera
- Family: Encyrtidae
- Genus: Neodusmetia
- Species: N. sangwani

Binomial name
- Neudusmetia sangwani (Rao, 1957)

Synonyms
- Dusmetia sangwani

= Neodusmetia sangwani =

Species of wasp

Neodusmetia sangwani is an encyrtid parasitoid from India that was used in classical biological control of the Rhodesgrass Scale, Antonina graminis (Maskell) (Pseudococcidae) which is a major pest of grasses outside of its native range in Asia. The parasitoid successfully controlled the scale infestation in Texas in the 1950s and 60s. It is considered among the most successful examples of classical biological control.

The species was first described by the Indian entomologist B. R. Subba Rao in 1957. The type was obtained from Antonina graminis in Hessarghatta, Bangalore by H.S. Sangwan after whom the species is named. The species completes one generation in about 20 days at 30 °C and about 50 to 60 days at 20 °C. The females are wingless, and short-lived while males have wings. In the two days lifespan, females lay about 6 eggs inside about 5 host scales.

The control of rhodesgrass scale in Texas in the 1960s is considered one of the success stories in classical biological control. Entomologists H.A. Dean and others estimated that the parasitoid saved $17 million in turf management per year and would have boosted cattle production by an estimated $177 million per year. In Florida, the encyrtid parasitoid Anagyrus antoninae was displaced in Florida after the introduction of Neodusmetia sangwani in the 1950s. The species has also been introduced into Israel and Brazil. Because the females are wingless, the dispersal is limited to about 0.8 km a year, assuming that populations survive through the year. The scale affected area was about 155,400 km^{2} which made it necessary to accelerate spread by air-dropping grass sprigs with parasites in cardboard boxes at about 1 per 0.25 square mile. The total cost of introducing the parasite by the Texas Agricultural Experiment Station at Weslaco was estimated at under $200,000.
