= Samea conjunctalis =

Scientific classification
- Kingdom: Animalia
- Phylum: Arthropoda
- Class: Insecta
- Order: Lepidoptera
- Family: Crambidae
- Genus: Samea
- Species: S. conjunctalis

Binomial name
- Samea conjunctalis Möschler, 1890

Species of moth

Samea conjunctalis is a moth in the family Crambidae. It is found in Puerto Rico.
