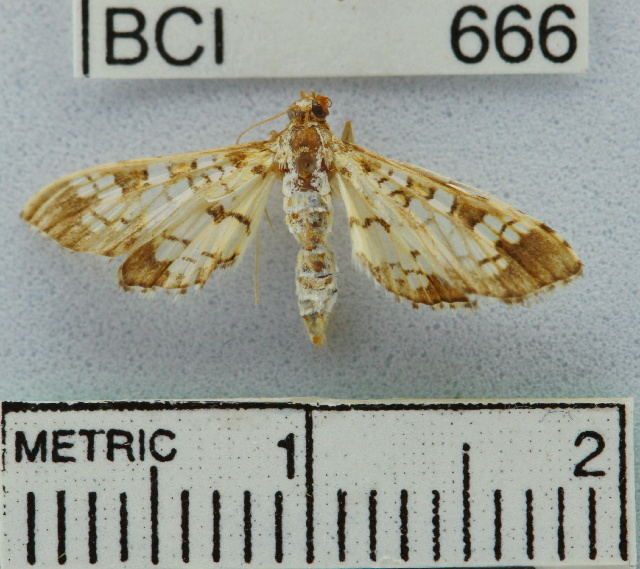

Scientific classification
- Kingdom: Animalia
- Phylum: Arthropoda
- Class: Insecta
- Order: Lepidoptera
- Family: Crambidae
- Genus: Samea
- Species: S. ecclesialis

Binomial name
- Samea ecclesialis Guenée, 1854

Synonyms
- Samea castellalis Guenée, 1854; Samea luccusalis Walker, 1859; Samea disertalis Walker, [1866]

= Samea ecclesialis =

Species of moth

Samea ecclesialis is a moth in the family Crambidae. It is found in Argentina, Brazil, Bolivia, Colombia, Ecuador, French Guiana, Panama, Costa Rica, Mexico and the United States, where it has been recorded from North Carolina to Florida, west to Texas.

Adults are on wing nearly year-round in the southern part of the range.
