= Samea baccatalis =

Scientific classification
- Kingdom: Animalia
- Phylum: Arthropoda
- Class: Insecta
- Order: Lepidoptera
- Family: Crambidae
- Genus: Samea
- Species: S. baccatalis

Binomial name
- Samea baccatalis (Hulst, 1892)

Synonyms
- Loxostege baccatalis Hulst, 1892

Species of moth

Samea baccatalis is a moth in the family Crambidae. It is found in North America, where it has been recorded from Alabama, Arizona, Florida, Georgia, Louisiana, Mississippi, Oklahoma, South Carolina and Texas.

The wingspan is 22–24 mm. The forewings are dull golden yellow, somewhat washed with fuscous. There are three sets of dull white spots on each wing, all edged with blackish. The hindwings are yellowish, becoming translucent whitish basally. There are distinct crosslines in the central area. Adults have been recorded on wing from March to December.
