= Samea choristalis =

Scientific classification
- Kingdom: Animalia
- Phylum: Arthropoda
- Class: Insecta
- Order: Lepidoptera
- Family: Crambidae
- Genus: Samea
- Species: S. choristalis

Binomial name
- Samea choristalis Hampson, 1912

Synonyms
- Samea chloristalis Dyar, 1914

Species of moth

Samea choristalis is a moth in the family Crambidae. It was described by George Hampson in 1912. It is found in Trinidad.

== Description ==
The wingspan is about 20 mm. The forewings are semi-hyaline yellow, the costal area suffused with brown on the basal half. There is an oblique brown line near the base, followed by a band. There is also a fine antemedial line, quadrate conjoined medial spots in and below the cell defined at the sides by brown, as well as a quadrate brown discoidal spot with some yellow in the centre. The postmedial line is brown, slightly waved and excurved between veins 6 and 2, then retracted to the lower angle of cell and oblique and waved to the inner margin. This line is defined on the outer side by a series of yellow spots in the interspaces from below the costa to vein 2. The terminal area is brown and the costa yellowish with some small blackish spots. The hindwings are semi-hyaline yellow with a dark point near the base, a black discoidal spot with an oblique sinuous line from it to above the tornus and a brown postmedial line.
