= Antonina (bug) =

Scientific classification
- Domain: Eukaryota
- Kingdom: Animalia
- Phylum: Arthropoda
- Class: Insecta
- Order: Hemiptera
- Suborder: Sternorrhyncha
- Family: Pseudococcidae
- Genus: Antonina; Signoret, 1875

Genus of true bugs

Antonina is a genus of mealybugs in the family Pseudococcidae. There are at least three described species in Antonina.

== Species ==
- Antonina crawii Cockerell, 1900
- Antonina graminis (Maskell, 1897)
- Antonina pretiosa Ferris, 1953 (noxious bamboo mealybug)
