= Ennapadam Sundara Narayanan =

E. S. Narayanan or Ennapadam Sundara Narayanan (15 February 1904 – 23 January 1991) was an Indian entomologist who specialized in biological control and headed the division of entomology at the Indian Agricultural Research Institute for a record fifteen years during the transition of the institute during Indian Independence.

Born in Palghat, he studied at the Government Victoria College and after receiving an MA from Presidency College, Madras he joined the Imperial Agricultural Research Institute in 1930. He worked under Thomas Bainbrigge Fletcher and was sent to the Imperial College, London for doctoral study. He worked during summer under W.R. Thompson on biological control and three months in Kent learning practical bee-keeping. He returned to New Delhi and headed the Division of Entomology, a position he held for 15 years. He retired in 1962 and worked at the Sericulture Research Institute, Mysore. He was a founding member of the Entomological Society of India and a Fellow of the Indian National Science Academy as well as the Indian Academy of Sciences.
