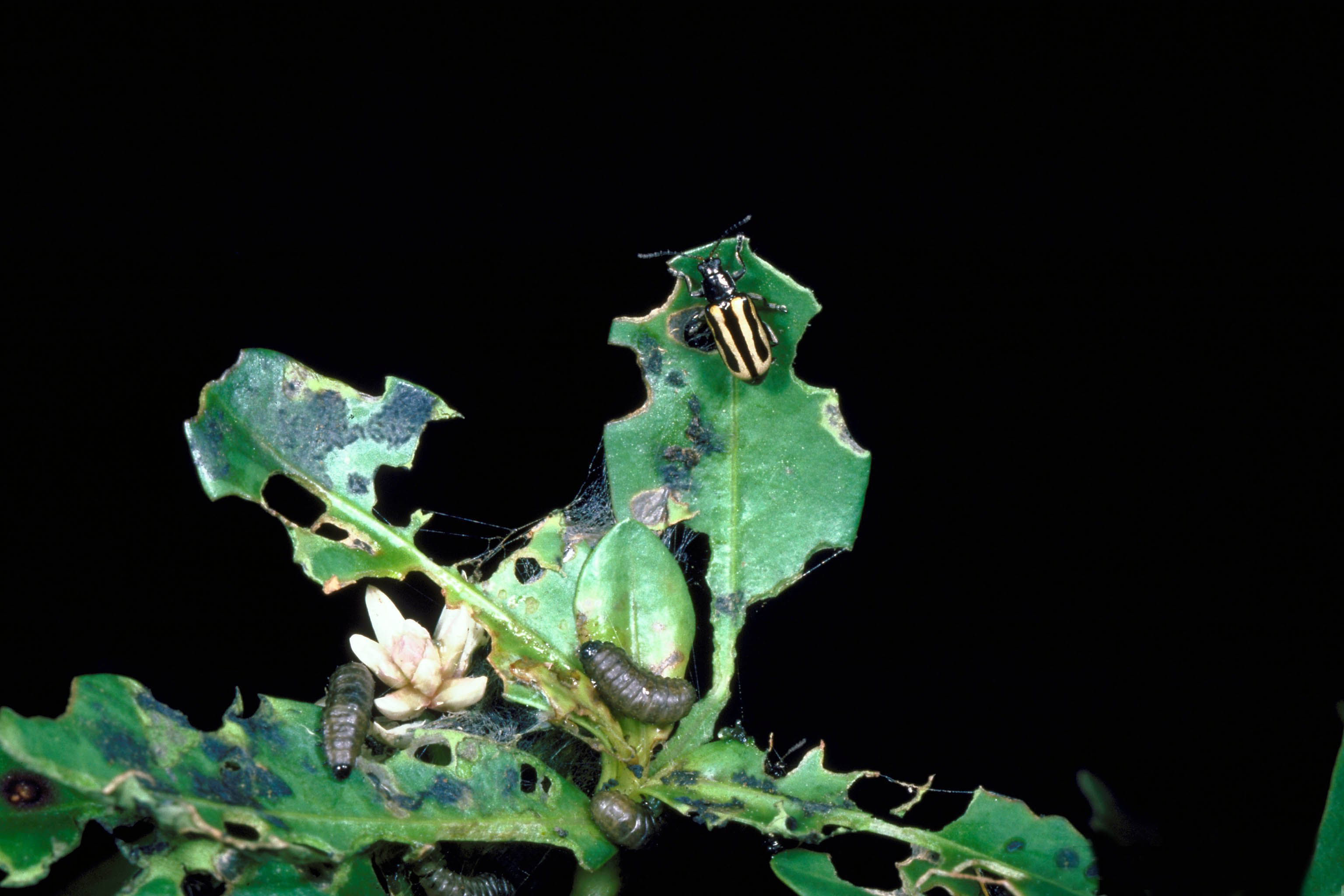
- Adult and larvae devouring leaves and stems of alligatorweed

Scientific classification
- Kingdom: Animalia
- Phylum: Arthropoda
- Clade: Pancrustacea
- Class: Insecta
- Order: Coleoptera
- Suborder: Polyphaga
- Infraorder: Cucujiformia
- Family: Chrysomelidae
- Subfamily: Galerucinae
- Tribe: Alticini
- Genus: Agasicles
- Species: A. hygrophila

Binomial name
- Agasicles hygrophila Selman & Vogt, 1971

= Agasicles hygrophila =

Species of beetle

Agasicles hygrophila is a species of leaf beetle known by the common name alligator weed flea beetle. It has been used successfully as an agent of biological pest control against the noxious aquatic plant known as alligator weed (Alternanthera philoxeroides).

This beetle is native to South America but has been imported to areas where alligator weed is a problem. The adult beetle is 5 mm in length and black with yellow stripes on its elytra. The female lays about 1,000 eggs in her six-week lifetime. Millimeter-long eggs are laid in rows on leaves, and the small yellow larvae emerge and eat the leaves. Adults also feed on the leaves. Defoliation of alligator weed mats kills the weed and clears the infested waterway. This beetle is established in much of the southeastern United States, where it lives on alligator weed only.

The beetle has been used as a biological control of alligator weed in New Zealand.
