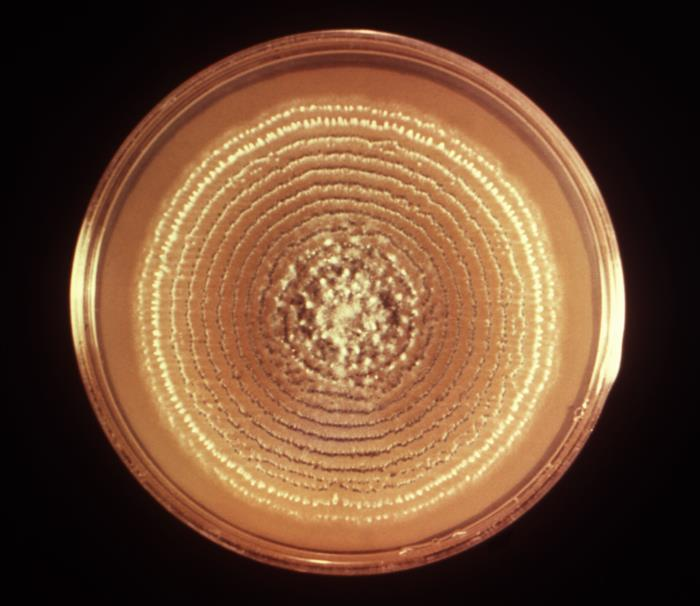
- Penicillium claviforme colony growing in petri dish

Scientific classification
- Domain: Eukaryota
- Kingdom: Fungi
- Division: Ascomycota
- Class: Eurotiomycetes
- Order: Eurotiales
- Family: Aspergillaceae
- Genus: Penicillium
- Species: P. claviforme

Binomial name
- Penicillium claviforme Bainier

= Penicillium claviforme =

Species of fungus

Penicillium claviforme is a species of Penicillium within the phylum Ascomycota. It is found within the subgenus Terverticillium. It has a coremium-type morphology in the sexual structures, named for its resemblance to matchsticks.

It is also known as Penicillium vulpinum; or synnema, meaning 'pillow', because of the closely appressed conidiophores.
