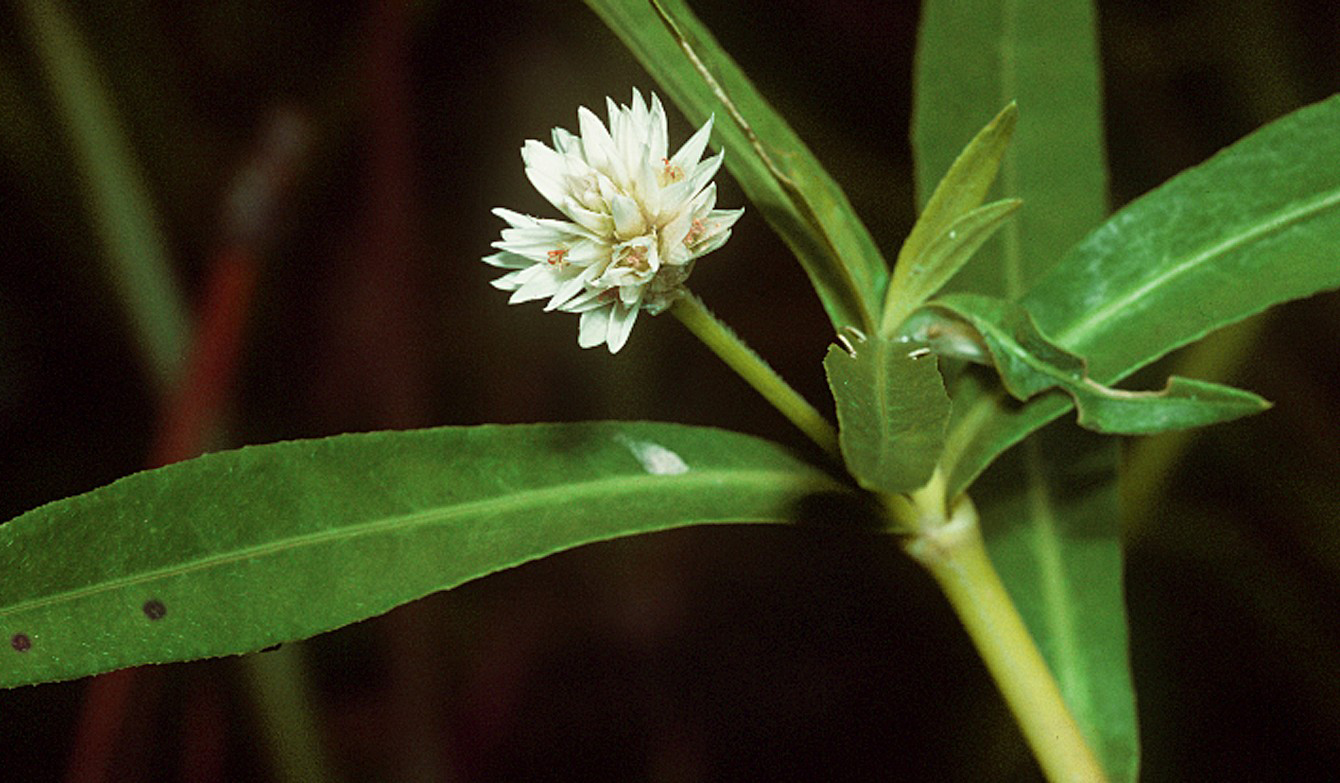

Scientific classification
- Kingdom: Plantae
- Clade: Tracheophytes
- Clade: Angiosperms
- Clade: Eudicots
- Order: Caryophyllales
- Family: Amaranthaceae
- Genus: Alternanthera
- Species: A. philoxeroides

Binomial name
- Alternanthera philoxeroides (Mart.) Griseb.

= Alternanthera philoxeroides =

Species of aquatic plant

Alternanthera philoxeroides, commonly referred to as alligator weed, is a species of aquatic plant native to the temperate regions of South America, which includes Argentina, Brazil, Paraguay and Uruguay. Argentina alone hosts around 27 species that fall within the range of the genus Alternanthera. Its geographic range once covered only the Parana River region of South America, but it has since expanded, having been introduced to over 30 countries, such as the United States, Japan, China, Australia, New Zealand and many more. This invasive species is believed to have been accidentally introduced to these non-native regions through sediments trapped by, or attached to, tanks and cargo of ships travelling from South America to these various areas.

== Description ==
Alternanthera philoxeroides can thrive in both dry and aquatic environments and is characterized by whitish, papery flowers along its short stalks, irregular, or sprawling hollow stems, and simple and opposite leaf pattern sprouting from its nodes. It is also considered a herbaceous plant due to its short-lived shoot system. It produces horizontal stems, otherwise known as stolons, that can sprout up to 10 metres (33 ft) in length and thanks to its hollow stems, floats easily. This results in large clusters of stem amassing and create dense mats along the surface. Bisexual flowers are small, white, and born on dense, axillary spikes (type of raceme). Presence of a peduncle is a key trait that distinguishes this species from the sessile inflorescences of Alternanthera sessilis. While seed production has been observed in its native range, there is currently no record of viable A. philoxeroides seeds in the introduced range. The weed's intricate root system can either allow them to hang free in the water to absorb nutrients or directly penetrate the soil/sediment and pull their nutrients from below.

== As an invasive species ==
Alternanthera philoxeroides is considered a major threat to ecosystems because of the adverse effects it poses on both aquatic and terrestrial environments, as well as the negative influence it has on society. The species features on the list of invasive alien species of Union concern since 2017. This means that import and trade of this species is forbidden in the whole of the European Union.

=== Impacts on vegetation ===
The presence of this invasive species disrupts the natural flow of water due to the dense mats created by its clusters of stems. It out competes the native vegetation for space and solar energy through these dense mats because they form large clusters and limit the amount of light that submerged vegetation receives. These compact clusters of stems also disturb the regular exchange of gases that occurs underneath the surface that directly influences aerobic processes, such as photosynthesis. Aside from driving down the population of native aquatic vegetation, A. philoxeroides can also influence the growth and yield of crops in pastures and fields. These dense mats can affect the natural flow of water that is used in irrigation systems and as well as affect the quality of the water by increasing the sedimentation present in the water. Both of these factors must remain undisturbed for crops to grow well, and thus to provide a healthy yield for farmers, which will be discussed in the later section on its impacts on society. On top of this, the likelihood of flooding is higher due to the impaired drainage caused by the dense mats, which in turn can also damage crops. This invasive species also has other negative impacts on the environment.

=== Impacts on animals ===
As mentioned, the compact mats formed by this species can drive down the population of native vegetation in the environments it invades. This then becomes a major issue for native herbivores because their food source declines. In addition, the dense mats present a challenge for the native wildlife by acting as a barrier between them and natural water sources. However, even if they can reach the water, they are still at risk because the water quality can be contaminated by the increased sediments. Thus, just as it did with the native vegetation, A. philoxeroides is also driving down the populations of the native wildlife as well.

=== Impacts on society ===
Dense mats formed by this species influence the natural flow of water, which can impede various recreational activities, such as boating and fishing. The disruption of flow can also have a negative impact on infrastructure when it comes to energy, such as the use of hydro-electric dams to power generators. The dense mats also present suitable ecological conditions that mosquitoes can thrive off of. This is a commensal relationship between mosquitoes and A. philoxeroides because mosquitoes receive a breeding ground and the plant gains nothing nor loses anything. The increased population of mosquitoes can bring an increased risk of mosquito-borne diseases in humans. Furthermore, the dense mats produced by A. philoxeroides may not present suitable ecological conditions for native species or humans to thrive off.

== Reproduction and dispersal ==
This invasive plant depends solely on vegetative means to reproduce and disperse itself in the area it has invaded and established its roots. In its native geographic range, the species spreads to through means of producing viable seeds; however, it has been observed within its non-native ranges that it rarely produces viable seeds. To accommodate this, the A. philoxeroides reproduces through fragmentation; the plant can regenerate itself from small portions of stems or small leaf cuttings. These small fragments of the plant can then be dispersed through human means and natural means; once it is dispersed, the fragments can then find suitable ecological conditions and root themselves and regenerate.

=== Human dispersal ===
In effort to eradicate the species by manual means, such as mulching or pulling them out, if not removed efficiently, small stem fragments can be displaced to new areas. Soil movement caused by earthmoving machinery is another example of how humans influence the dispersal of the plant.

=== Natural dispersal ===
In aquatic environments, the A. philoxeroides can easily disperse its fragments by being sucked into the path of the waterways. In terrestrial environments, the small fragments of stems and leaf cuttings can be dispersed through the natural movement of soil caused by erosion. Thus, the geographic range of this invasive species can easily be expanded by any means necessary due to its ability to regenerate from practically nothing.

== Methods of control ==
=== Preventive measures ===
Early detection is the best bet to ensure that the invasive species does not successfully colonize a non-native region because of its ability to regenerate and propagate from small portions of its stem or leaf cuttings. However, when that is not possible, the best that can be done is to limit and control the presence of A. philoxeroides in an area. Alternanthera philoxeroides can only establish itself in shallow waters no deeper than 2 metres (2 yards), so one method of control is to erect barriers in shallower areas to limit the amount of suitable space the plant has. When it comes to terrestrial environments, overpopulating the area with native species can limit the suitable space available for it. However, this method is only effective before the invasive plant has asserted itself in an area. Lastly, as previously mentioned, this plant is only able to produce viable seeds in its native geographic range and not in the areas it has invaded. Learning why that is - what ecological conditions make it produce only sterile seeds - could be key to developing further preventative measures against it.

=== Biological measures ===
Insects have been released for the biological control of A. philoxeroides. The most successful and widely used is Agasicles hygrophila commonly called the alligator weed flea beetle; it has been released for biocontrol in Australia, China, Thailand, New Zealand, and the United States. However, their effectiveness is limited due to their inability to survive through temperatures lower than 11 °C (52 °F). Amynothrips andersoni, the alligator weed thrips, and Vogtia malloi, the alligator weed stem borer, have also been released in the United States. These species result in immediate wilting and limit A. philoxeroides reproduction by colonizing its stems. A variety of chemicals have been shown to be effective in controlling the plant, the most useful of which include glyphosate, triclopyr, fluridone, imazamox, and imazapyr; however, they must constantly be applied to be successful.

=== Legality of sale and shipment in the United States ===
In 1956, A. philoxeroides was banned for sale or shipment in the United States, subject to a fine and/or imprisonment. This law was repealed by H.R.498 [116th Congress (2019–2020)] on January 23, 2019.

== See also ==
- Ludwigia grandiflora
