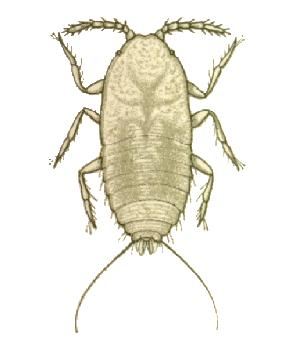

Scientific classification
- Kingdom: Animalia
- Phylum: Arthropoda
- Class: Insecta
- Order: Hemiptera
- Suborder: Sternorrhyncha
- Family: Pseudococcidae
- Genus: Antonina
- Species: A. graminis

Binomial name
- Antonina graminis (Maskell, 1897)

= Antonina graminis =

Species of true bug

Antonina graminis or Rhodes grass scale is a species of mealybug in the family Pseudococcidae. In the 1940s the species, originating in Asia, infested nearly 69 species fodder and turf grasses in Texas causing major economic loss. Classical biological control was made use of in the 1950s and 60s with nearly complete control achieved after the aerial introduction of a wingless encyrtid parasite from India, Neodusmetia sangwani. By 1976 the control was a complete success and nearly US$17 million was estimated as savings due to the parasite.
