= List of Trichoderma species =

This is a list of binomial names in the fungal genus Trichoderma Pers. (1801) (in the family of Hypocreaceae), with just accepted species and not including synonyms.

'Outline of Fungi and fungus-like taxa' by Wijayawardene et al. lists up to (400+) species (in 2020), and around 466 records are listed by Species Fungorum (with up to 12 former species).

A list of Trichoderma contains the following accepted species:

1. Trichoderma achlamydosporum
2. Trichoderma acremonioides
3. Trichoderma adaptatum
4. Trichoderma aeroaquaticum
5. Trichoderma aerugineum
6. Trichoderma aestuarinum
7. Trichoderma aethiopicum
8. Trichoderma afarasin
9. Trichoderma afroharzianum
10. Trichoderma aggregatum
11. Trichoderma aggressivum
12. Trichoderma albofulvopsis
13. Trichoderma albolutescens
14. Trichoderma alboviride
15. Trichoderma alni
16. Trichoderma alpinum
17. Trichoderma alutaceum
18. Trichoderma amazonicum
19. Trichoderma amoenum
20. Trichoderma anaharzianum
21. Trichoderma andinense
22. Trichoderma angustum
23. Trichoderma anisohamatum
24. Trichoderma appalachiense
25. Trichoderma applanatum
26. Trichoderma aquaticum
27. Trichoderma arachnoidea
28. Trichoderma arenarium
29. Trichoderma arundinaceum
30. Trichoderma asiaticum
31. Trichoderma asperelloides
32. Trichoderma asperellum
33. Trichoderma asymmetricum
34. Trichoderma atlanticum
35. Trichoderma atrobrunneum
36. Trichoderma atroviride
37. Trichoderma attinorum
38. Trichoderma auranteffusum
39. Trichoderma aurantioeffusum
40. Trichoderma aureoviride
41. Trichoderma aureum
42. Trichoderma austriacum
43. Trichoderma austrokoningii
44. Trichoderma awajun
45. Trichoderma azevedoi
46. Trichoderma balearicum
47. Trichoderma bannaense
48. Trichoderma barbatum
49. Trichoderma bavaricum
50. Trichoderma beijingense
51. Trichoderma beinartii
52. Trichoderma bifurcatum
53. Trichoderma bissettii
54. Trichoderma bomiense
55. Trichoderma botryosum
56. Trichoderma brassicae
57. Trichoderma breve
58. Trichoderma brevicompactum
59. Trichoderma brevicrassum
60. Trichoderma brevipes
61. Trichoderma brunneoviride
62. Trichoderma byssinum
63. Trichoderma caeruleimontis
64. Trichoderma caeruleoviride
65. Trichoderma caesareum
66. Trichoderma caesium
67. Trichoderma calamagrostidis
68. Trichoderma camelliae
69. Trichoderma camerunense
70. Trichoderma candidum
71. Trichoderma capillare
72. Trichoderma caribbaeum
73. Trichoderma carneum
74. Trichoderma catoptron
75. Trichoderma ceciliae
76. Trichoderma centrosinicum
77. Trichoderma ceraceum
78. Trichoderma ceramicum
79. Trichoderma ceratophylli
80. Trichoderma cerinum
81. Trichoderma changbaiense
82. Trichoderma chetii
83. Trichoderma chlamydosporicum
84. Trichoderma chlorosporum
85. Trichoderma christianii
86. Trichoderma chromospermum
87. Trichoderma cinnabarinum
88. Trichoderma cinnamomeum
89. Trichoderma citrinella
90. Trichoderma citrinoviride
91. Trichoderma compactum
92. Trichoderma composticola
93. Trichoderma concentricum
94. Trichoderma confertum
95. Trichoderma confluens
96. Trichoderma cordobense
97. Trichoderma corfecianum
98. Trichoderma cornu-damae
99. Trichoderma crassum
100. Trichoderma cremeoides
101. Trichoderma cremeum
102. Trichoderma croceum
103. Trichoderma crystalligenum Jaklitsch (2006)
104. Trichoderma crystalligenum W.T. Qin & W.Y. Zhuang (2017)
105. Trichoderma cuenisporum
106. Trichoderma cyanodichotomus
107. Trichoderma dacrymycellum
108. Trichoderma delicatulum
109. Trichoderma deliquescens
110. Trichoderma densum
111. Trichoderma desrochii
112. Trichoderma dimorphum
113. Trichoderma dingleyeae
114. Trichoderma dorotheae
115. Trichoderma dubium
116. Trichoderma effusum
117. Trichoderma eijii
118. Trichoderma endophyticum
119. Trichoderma epimyces
120. Trichoderma erinaceum
121. Trichoderma estonicum
122. Trichoderma europaeum
123. Trichoderma euskadiense
124. Trichoderma evansii
125. Trichoderma fasciculatum
126. Trichoderma fassatiovae
127. Trichoderma fertile
128. Trichoderma flagellatum
129. Trichoderma flavescens
130. Trichoderma flavofuscum
131. Trichoderma flavum
132. Trichoderma floccosum
133. Trichoderma fomiticola
134. Trichoderma fujianense
135. Trichoderma fuscum
136. Trichoderma gamsii
137. Trichoderma ganodermatis
138. Trichoderma gansuanum
139. Trichoderma gelatinosum
140. Trichoderma ghanense
141. Trichoderma gillesii
142. Trichoderma gliocladium
143. Trichoderma globoides
144. Trichoderma gracile
145. Trichoderma grande
146. Trichoderma granulosum
147. Trichoderma gregarium
148. Trichoderma guizhouense
149. Trichoderma guttatum
150. Trichoderma hainanense
151. Trichoderma hamatum
152. Trichoderma harzianum
153. Trichoderma hausknechtii
154. Trichoderma hebeiense
155. Trichoderma helicolixii
156. Trichoderma helicum
157. Trichoderma hengshanicum
158. Trichoderma hongkongense
159. Trichoderma hubeiense
160. Trichoderma hunanense
161. Trichoderma hunua
162. Trichoderma hypoxylon
163. Trichoderma inaequilaterale
164. Trichoderma inconspicuum
165. Trichoderma ingratum
166. Trichoderma inhamatum
167. Trichoderma insigne
168. Trichoderma intricatum
169. Trichoderma istrianum
170. Trichoderma italicum
171. Trichoderma ivoriense
172. Trichoderma jaklitschii
173. Trichoderma junci
174. Trichoderma konilangbra
175. Trichoderma koningii
176. Trichoderma koningiopsis
177. Trichoderma koreanum
178. Trichoderma kunmingense
179. Trichoderma lacteum
180. Trichoderma laeve
181. Trichoderma laevisporum
182. Trichoderma lanuginosum
183. Trichoderma lateritioroseum
184. Trichoderma leguminosarum
185. Trichoderma lentiforme
186. Trichoderma lentinulae
187. Trichoderma lentissimum
188. Trichoderma leucopus
189. Trichoderma liberatum
190. Trichoderma lieckfeldtiae
191. Trichoderma limonium
192. Trichoderma linzhiense
193. Trichoderma lixii
194. Trichoderma longibrachiatum
195. Trichoderma longiphialidicum
196. Trichoderma longipile
197. Trichoderma longisporum
198. Trichoderma luteffusum
199. Trichoderma luteocrystallinum
200. Trichoderma luteoeffusum
201. Trichoderma mangshanicum
202. Trichoderma margaretense
203. Trichoderma martiale
204. Trichoderma mediterraneum
205. Trichoderma medusae
206. Trichoderma melanomagnum
207. Trichoderma mienum
208. Trichoderma minutisporum
209. Trichoderma minutum
210. Trichoderma moravicum
211. Trichoderma neokoningii
212. Trichoderma neorufoides
213. Trichoderma neosinense
214. Trichoderma neotropicale
215. Trichoderma nigrovirens
216. Trichoderma nothescens
217. Trichoderma novae-zelandiae
218. Trichoderma oblongisporum
219. Trichoderma obovatum
220. Trichoderma oligosporum
221. Trichoderma olivascens
222. Trichoderma ovalisporum
223. Trichoderma pachypallidum
224. Trichoderma panacis
225. Trichoderma paraceramosus
226. Trichoderma parareesei
227. Trichoderma pararogersonii
228. Trichoderma paratroviride
229. Trichoderma paraviride
230. Trichoderma paraviridescens
231. Trichoderma parepimyces
232. Trichoderma parestonicum
233. Trichoderma paucisporum
234. Trichoderma peberdyi
235. Trichoderma pedunculatum
236. Trichoderma penicillatum
237. Trichoderma peruvianum
238. Trichoderma perviride
239. Trichoderma petersenii
240. Trichoderma pezizoideum
241. Trichoderma phayaoense
242. Trichoderma phellinicola
243. Trichoderma phyllostachydis
244. Trichoderma piluliferum
245. Trichoderma pinnatum
246. Trichoderma placentula
247. Trichoderma pleuroti
248. Trichoderma pleuroticola
249. Trichoderma pluripenicillatum
250. Trichoderma pollinicola
251. Trichoderma polyalthiae
252. Trichoderma polypori
253. Trichoderma polysporum
254. Trichoderma poronioideum
255. Trichoderma priscilae
256. Trichoderma propepolypori
257. Trichoderma protrudens
258. Trichoderma pruinosum
259. Trichoderma pseudoasiaticum
260. Trichoderma pseudoasperelloides
261. Trichoderma pseudocandidum
262. Trichoderma pseudodensum
263. Trichoderma pseudogelatinosa
264. Trichoderma pseudokoningii
265. Trichoderma pseudolacteum
266. Trichoderma pseudonigrovirens
267. Trichoderma pseudostraminea
268. Trichoderma psychrophilum
269. Trichoderma pubescens
270. Trichoderma purpureum
271. Trichoderma pyramidale
272. Trichoderma pyrenium
273. Trichoderma pyrenium
274. Trichoderma racemosum
275. Trichoderma reesei
276. Trichoderma restrictum
277. Trichoderma rifaii
278. Trichoderma rogersonii
279. Trichoderma roseum
280. Trichoderma rossicum
281. Trichoderma rosulatum
282. Trichoderma rubi
283. Trichoderma rubropallens
284. Trichoderma rufobrunneum
285. Trichoderma rugosum
286. Trichoderma rugulosum
287. Trichoderma samuelsii
288. Trichoderma saturnisporopsis
289. Trichoderma saturnisporum
290. Trichoderma scalesiae
291. Trichoderma scorpioideum
292. Trichoderma sempervirentis
293. Trichoderma seppoi
294. Trichoderma shaoguanicum
295. Trichoderma shennongjianum
296. Trichoderma sichuanense
297. Trichoderma silvae-virgineae
298. Trichoderma simile
299. Trichoderma simmonsii
300. Trichoderma simplex
301. Trichoderma sinense
302. Trichoderma sinoaustrale
303. Trichoderma sinokoningii
304. Trichoderma sinoluteum
305. Trichoderma sinuosum
306. Trichoderma solani
307. Trichoderma solum
308. Trichoderma songyi
309. Trichoderma sparsum
310. Trichoderma speciosum
311. Trichoderma sphaerosporum
312. Trichoderma spirale
313. Trichoderma stercorarium
314. Trichoderma stilbohypoxyli
315. Trichoderma stipitatum
316. Trichoderma stramineum
317. Trichoderma strictipile
318. Trichoderma strigosellum
319. Trichoderma strigosum
320. Trichoderma stromaticum
321. Trichoderma subalni
322. Trichoderma subalpinum
323. Trichoderma subazureum
324. Trichoderma subeffusum
325. Trichoderma subiculoides
326. Trichoderma subsulphureum
327. Trichoderma subuliforme
328. Trichoderma subviride
329. Trichoderma supraverticillatum
330. Trichoderma surrotundum
331. Trichoderma sympodianum
332. Trichoderma taiwanense
333. Trichoderma tardum
334. Trichoderma tawa
335. Trichoderma taxi
336. Trichoderma tenue
337. Trichoderma texanum
338. Trichoderma thailandicum
339. Trichoderma thelephoricola
340. Trichoderma theobromicola
341. Trichoderma thermophilum
342. Trichoderma tiantangzhaiense
343. Trichoderma tibetense
344. Trichoderma tibeticum
345. Trichoderma tomentosum
346. Trichoderma tremelloides
347. Trichoderma trixiae
348. Trichoderma tropicosinense
349. Trichoderma turrialbense
350. Trichoderma uncinatum
351. Trichoderma undatipile
352. Trichoderma undulatum
353. Trichoderma valdunense
354. Trichoderma varians
355. Trichoderma velutinum
356. Trichoderma vermifimicola
357. Trichoderma vermipilum
358. Trichoderma verticillatum
359. Trichoderma vinosum
360. Trichoderma violaceum
361. Trichoderma virens
362. Trichoderma virgatum
363. Trichoderma viridarium
364. Trichoderma viride Pers. (1794)
365. Trichoderma viride Schumach. (1803)
366. Trichoderma viridescens
367. Trichoderma viridialbum
368. Trichoderma viridicollare
369. Trichoderma viridiflavum
370. Trichoderma viridulum
371. Trichoderma virilente
372. Trichoderma voglmayrii
373. Trichoderma vulgatum
374. Trichoderma vulpinum
375. Trichoderma xanthum
376. Trichoderma xixiacum
377. Trichoderma yui
378. Trichoderma yunnanense
379. Trichoderma zayuense
380. Trichoderma zelobreve
381. Trichoderma zeloharzianum
382. Trichoderma zonatum
