= Enrique Monte =

Spanish academic

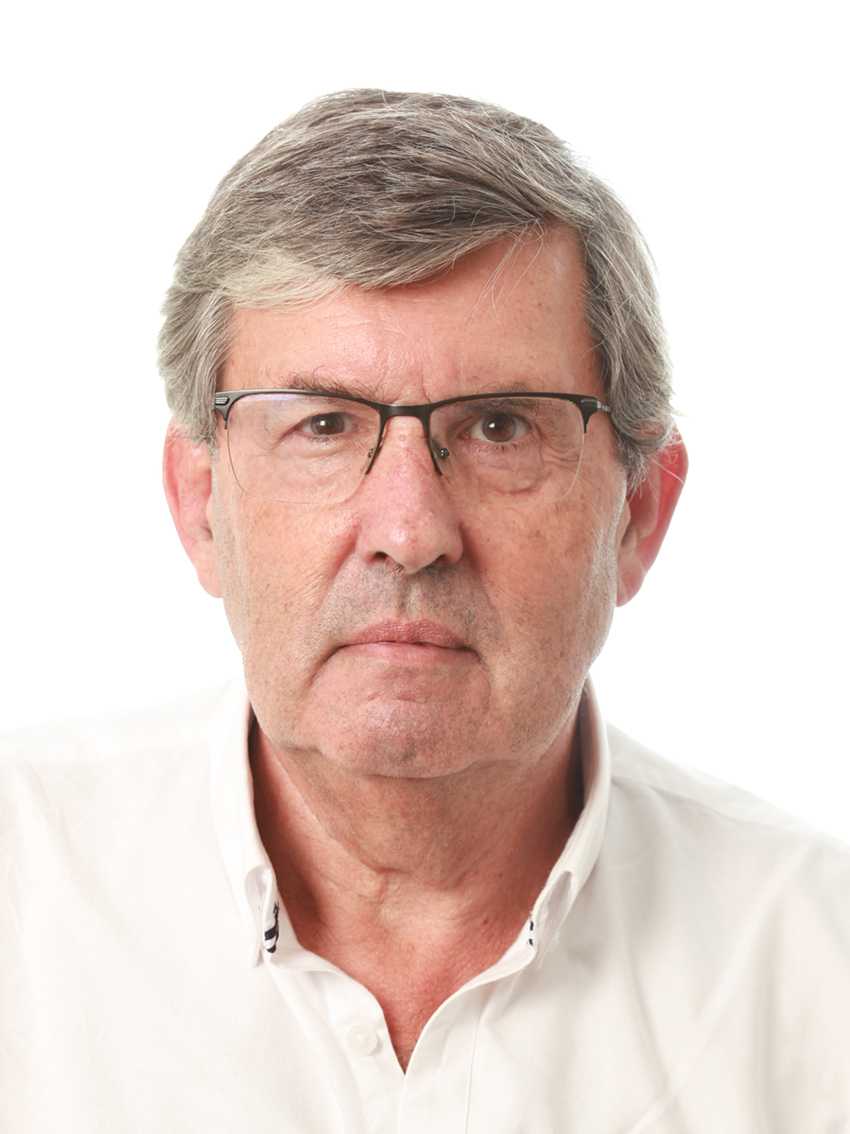
- Born: Mieres, Spain
- Occupations: Plant microbiologist and academic

Academic background
- Education: M.Sc., Pharmacy; Ph.D., Microbiology
- Alma mater: University of Seville; University of Salamanca

Enrique Monte is a Spanish plant microbiologist and academic. He is a professor of microbiology at the University of Salamanca.

Monte's research concerns functional genomics, Trichoderma-plant interactions, and heritable plant defense mechanisms. He was awarded the Severo Ochoa Prize by the Prince of Asturias Foundation in 1999.

== Education ==
Monte graduated with a degree in Pharmacy from the University of Seville in 1982. In 1986, he completed a Ph.D. in Microbiology from the University of Salamanca.

== Career ==
Monte started his academic career at the University of Salamanca, where he was appointed an assistant professor in 1983 and associate professor in 1991. Since 2007, he has been a university professor at the Institute for Agrobiotechnology Research at the University of Salamanca. During this time, he also directed a postgraduate course at the University of Buenos Aires. In 1998, he founded the biotechnology company NBT.

== Research ==
Monte's research on Trichoderma focused on developing and applying isoenzyme analysis and gene sequencing techniques to distinguish morphologically similar strains within the T. harzianum species complex that possess biocontrol potential against pathogenic fungi. He further investigated the enzymatic activities of different Trichoderma strains involved in biocontrol mechanisms against nematodes and insects.

Monte also demonstrated that Trichoderma stimulates the expression of plant genes associated with salicylic acid (SA), jasmonic acid (JA), and ethylene (ET) production, though at higher inoculum levels, it can alter this balance by suppressing SA-dependent defenses and enhancing JA, ET, and auxin pathways. His work also indicated that Trichoderma can promote plant development by influencing the phytohormonal balance to enhance growth and immunity. Monte proposed that the growth enhancement and disease resistance conferred by Trichoderma can be inherited by plants through sustained interactions with the fungus.

Together with colleagues, he found that Trichoderma induces defense responses in tomato plants under biotic and abiotic stress by upregulating SA- and JA/ET-dependent defense pathways. His research also emphasized that SA functions as a key phytohormone barrier, preventing Trichoderma from colonizing the plant's vascular bundles.

In a collaborative study, Monte reported that T. harzianum enhances the association between arbuscular mycorrhizal fungi and non-host Brassicaceae roots, improving plant productivity. Similarly, Trichoderma strains were shown to effectively control Verticillium decay in olive plants.

Monte also identified that endopolygalacturonase (ThPG1) produced by T. harzianum releases damage-associated molecular pattern (DAMP) signals, which can act as initiators to strengthen Trichoderma-induced systemic resistance in plants. Furthermore, his studies observed that Trichoderma produces phytohormones such as ABA, CKs, GAs, SA, ET, and auxin in a strain-specific manner, and that their combined action enhances both plant growth and defense responses.

== Awards and honors ==
- 1999 – Severo Ochoa Prize, Prince of Asturias Foundation
- 2024 – World’s Top 2% Scientists, Stanford University

== Selected articles ==
- Hermosa, M. R.; Grondona, I.; Iturriaga, E. A.; Diaz-Minguez, J. M.; Castro, C.; Monte, E.; Garcia-Acha, I. (May 2000). "Molecular Characterization and Identification of Biocontrol Isolates of Trichoderma spp". Applied and Environmental Microbiology. 66 (5): 1890–1898. Bibcode:2000ApEnM..66.1890H. doi:10.1128/AEM.66.5.1890-1898.2000. PMC 101429. PMID 10788356.
- Lorito, Matteo; Woo, Sheridan L.; Monte, Enrique (September 2010). "Translational Research on Trichoderma: From 'Omics to the Field". Annual Review of Phytopathology. 48 (1): 395–417. Bibcode:2010AnRvP..48..395L. doi:10.1146/annurev-phyto-073009-114314. PMID 20455700.
- Kubicek, Christian P.; Herrera-Estrella, Alfredo; Seidl-Seiboth, Verena; Martinez, Diego A.; Druzhinina, Irina S.; Thon, Michael; Zeilinger, Susanne; Casas-Flores, Sergio; Horwitz, Benjamin A.; Mukherjee, Prasun K.; Mukherjee, Mala; et al. (April 2011). "Comparative genome sequence analysis underscores mycoparasitism as the ancestral life style of Trichoderma". Genome Biology. 12 (4): R40. doi:10.1186/gb-2011-12-4-r40. PMC 3218866. PMID 21501500.
- Druzhinina, Irina S.; Seidl-Seiboth, Verena; Herrera-Estrella, Alfredo; Horwitz, Benjamin A.; Kenerley, Charles M.; Monte, Enrique; Mukherjee, Prasun K.; Zeilinger, Susanne; Grigoriev, Igor V.; Kubicek, Christian P. (October 2011). "Trichoderma: the genomics of opportunistic success". Nature Reviews Microbiology. 9 (10): 749–759. doi:10.1038/nrmicro2637. PMID 21921934.
- Hermosa, Rosa; Viterbo, Ada; Chet, Ilan; Monte, Enrique (January 2012). "Plant-beneficial effects of Trichoderma and of its genes". Microbiology. 158 (1): 17–25. doi:10.1099/mic.0.052274-0. PMID 21998166.
- Medeiros, H.A.; Araújo Filho, J.V.; Freitas, L.G.; Castillo, P.; Rubio, M.B.; Hermosa, R.; Monte, E. (January 2017). "Tomato progeny inherit resistance to the nematode Meloidogyne javanica linked to plant growth induced by the biocontrol fungus Trichoderma atroviride". Scientific Reports. 7 40216. Bibcode:2017NatSR...740216M. doi:10.1038/srep40216. PMC 5223212. PMID 28071749.
- Woo, Sheridan L.; Hermosa, Rosa; Lorito, Matteo; Monte, Enrique (May 2023). "Trichoderma: a multipurpose plant-beneficial microorganism for eco-sustainable agriculture". Nature Reviews Microbiology. 21 (5): 312–326. doi:10.1038/s41579-022-00819-5. PMID 36414835.
