= Pythium aphanidermatum =

Scientific classification
- Domain: Eukaryota
- Supergroup: Stramenopiles
- Division: Oomycota
- Class: Peronosporomycetes
- Order: Peronosporales
- Family: Pythiaceae
- Genus: Pythium
- Species: P. aphanidermatum

Binomial name
- Pythium aphanidermatum (Edson) Fitzp., (1923)

Synonyms
- Nematosporangium aphanidermatum (Edson) Fitzp., Mycologia 15: 168 (1923); Rheosporangium aphanidermatum Edson, (1915)

Species of oomycete

Pythium aphanidermatum is a soil borne plant pathogen. Pythium is a genus in the class Oomycetes, which are also known as water molds. Oomycetes are not true fungi, as their cell walls are made of cellulose instead of chitin, they are diploid in their vegetative state, and they form coenocytic hyphae (lacking crosswalls). Also, they reproduce asexually with motile biflagelette zoospores that require water to move towards and infect a host. Sexually, they reproduce with structures called antheridia, oogonia, and oospores.

== Hosts ==
Pythium aphanidermatum has a wide host range, and can have an economic impact on the cultivation of soybeans, beets, peppers, chrysanthemum, cucurbits, cotton and turf-grasses, however, because P. aphanidermatum requires warmer temperatures, it is often seen in greenhouses and has a large impact in poinsettia production. It is a major cause of root rot in papaya production in subtropical areas. While this is almost exclusively a plant pathogen, there is one documented case of P. aphanidermatum infecting a human being injured in the Afghanistan conflict.

== Symptoms ==
Pythium aphanidermatum is responsible for pre- and post-emergence damping off. Pre-emergence damping off is when the seed is infected prior to germination. This can result in poor or no germination, and is observable as a browning or rotting of the seed. Post-emergence damping off takes place after germination and results in a thinning, water-soaked stem near the plant collar, which eventually causes the collapse of the plant. P. aphanidermatum can also cause root rot. Symptoms of root rot include stunted growth, chlorotic leaves, leaf drop, and wilting. The infection begins at the root tip, and can cause the infected region to lose its protective outer layer, exposing the inner root to other pathogens.

== Disease cycle ==
Pythium aphanidermatum overwinters in the soil as oospores, hyphae and/or sporangia. Oospores can produce a germ tube and infect the plant directly, or, if the environment is favorable (that is an adequate amount of water is present), the oospore may produce sporangia, which in turn produce motile, biflagallete zoospores that swim to the host plant, encyst, and germinate. This infection can occur on seeds, which can rot, or produce a weak seedling. If it infects the roots of a seedling, the mycelium will grow throughout the plant tissue, releasing digestive enzymes which break down plant cell walls allowing the pathogen to absorb the nutrients, effectively killing the plant over time. P. aphanidermatum is a polycyclic disease A polycyclic plant pathogen has several life cycles during a season, meaning it can reinfect the host plant, or travel to another plant. After infection, several things can happen that spreads the infection: 1)More asexual structures form, including sporangiophores and sporangia, which release more zoospores which can reinfect the host plant, or move to other plants. 2)There can also be sexual reproduction when two different mating hyphal types meet, creating an oogonium (female structure), and an antheridium (male structure). This results in genetic recombination and exists as an oospore-the original overwintering stage of the pathogen.

== Environment ==
Pythium aphanidermatum infects plants via motile zoospores, and because zoospores need to swim in order to infect the host, moist conditions facilitate the most rapid spread of the disease. Temperature also has an effect on the rate of pathogen propagation. The pathogen can cause disease in cool temperatures (55–64 °F) but ideal conditions are between 86 °F and 95 °F, a characteristic which distinguishes it from other Pythium species. Potential host plants that are stressed are more susceptible to infection. Factors that may cause stress in plants and therefore increase the likelihood of infection include high saline conditions, drought, nutrient deficiencies, and excessive moisture around the plant. High saline content in the soil can promote infection at lower temperature and humidity that is ideal for the pathogen. Excessive nitrogen fertilization will also increase the chance of infection because the nitrogen decreases the function of the plant's innate defense response, and it also damages the ends of the roots, which are the primary mode of infection. Furthermore, the medium in which plants are grown dictates affects the severity of Pythium infection. Sterile soil-less cultures are the most susceptible, while increasing soil content inhibits disease progression due to bacteria present in the soil. Finally, seedlings and plants that are germinating have greater susceptibility to the pathogen, and often experience damping off.

== Management ==
Several cultural management methods can be effective in avoiding disease caused by Pythium aphanidermatum. The pathogen thrives in a moist environment, so it is important to prevent an excessive amount of moisture from building up in the plant media Irrigation that is too frequent and usage of soil that has poor drainage are common mistakes that result in inoculation. In addition, poor ventilation and insufficient exposure to sunlight can cause the plants themselves to accumulate moisture, potentially spreading disease. Sanitation of the soil using chemical treatment and minimizing the amount of plant debris in which the pathogen can survive is also an effective cultural practice. Fungicides are also effective control methods. Systemic and contact fungicides can be used, but in order to prevent the pathogen from becoming resistant to the treatment it is best to alternate between systemic and contact substances. Several chemical types can be used to manage the pathogen including acylalanines, thiadiazoles, carbamates, cinnamic acid derivatives, phosphonates, and phosphites. In general, these fungicides yield best results when used for preventative purposes. Biological control of the pathogen has also been successful. Bacteria and fungi can be used to treat Pythium aphanidermatum in turf, crops, and flowering greenhouse plants. Bacteria species include Bacillus subtilis, Candida oleophila, Enterobacter cloacae, and Pseudomonas species. Fungi include many Trichoderma species, namely T. harziamum, T. virens, and T. hamatum.

== Importance ==
Damage caused by Pythium aphanidermatum is difficult to measure because it has such a wide host range and infection results in a variety of symptoms, all of which are detrimental in different ways. Damage is important and most prevalent in warm and humid regions where soils are particularly wet. Valley areas and river bottom fields are particularly susceptible to infection. In general, the pathogen is especially important in crops such as maize, cotton, cereal crops, and high value horticultural crops. The pathogen is also economically important in crops that are produced both in greenhouses and by soil-less culture. Root infection and seedling damping off are responsible for a decrease in plant health and reduction in yield for economic crops. Tomato is one of the most popular vegetable crops throughout the world and it is also widely cultivated. In tomatoes, P. aphanidermatum causes significant losses in nurseries where young susceptible transplants are produced.

== See also ==
- PaNie
