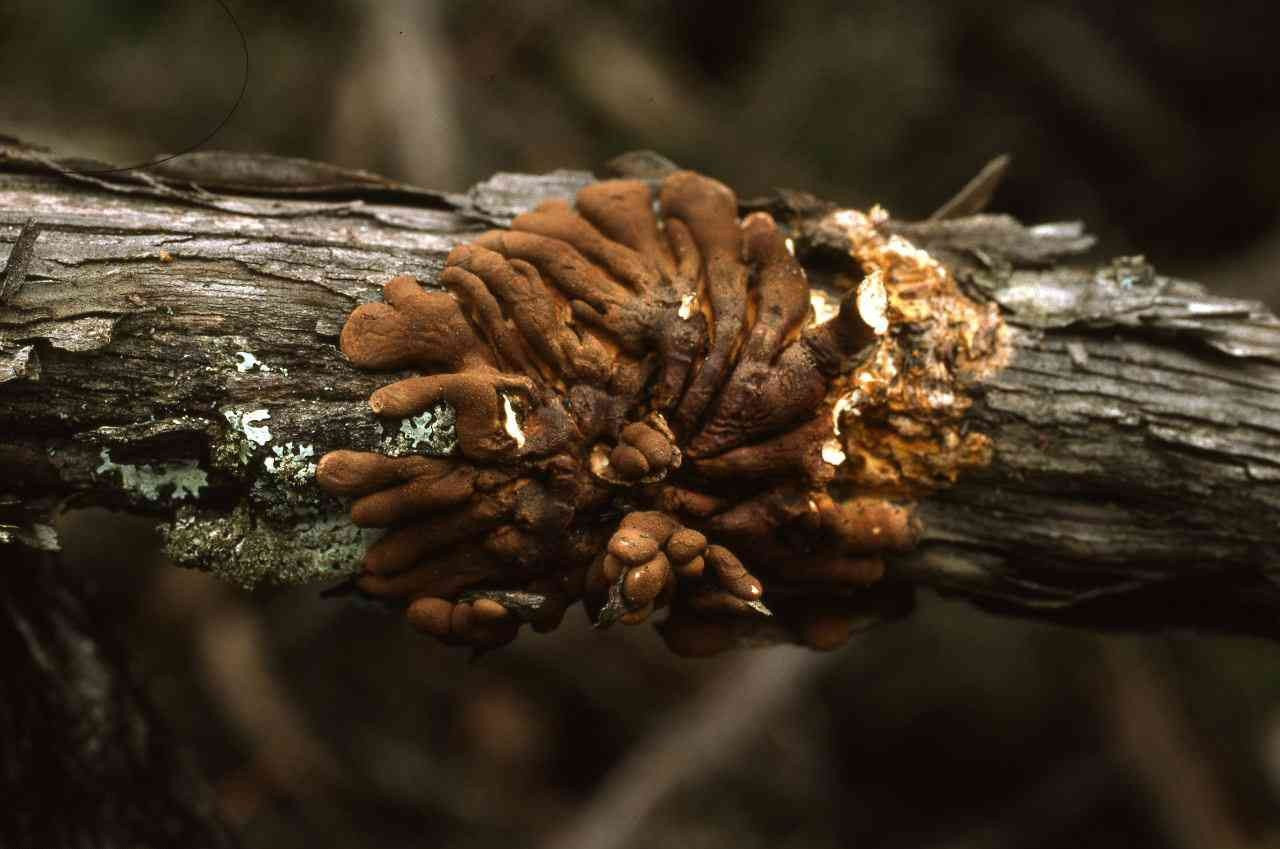

Scientific classification
- Kingdom: Fungi
- Division: Ascomycota
- Class: Sordariomycetes
- Order: Hypocreales
- Family: Hypocreaceae
- Genus: Hypocreopsis
- Species: H. amplectens

Binomial name
- Hypocreopsis amplectens T.W.May & P.R.Johnst. (2007)

= Hypocreopsis amplectens =

Species of fungus

Hypocreopsis amplectens is part of the family Hypocreaceae and genus Hypocreopsis, a group of fungi that form ascomata on the stems of trees and shrubs. The ascomata are orange-brown and consist of radiating, perithecial lobes. This species of Hypocreopsis was only discovered in 1992 in Nyora (Victoria) during a botanical survey.

== Description ==
Found on dead and living branches of tea-tree, paperbark and banksia in long-unburnt coastal stands in Victoria, this firm-textured, brown, irregularly shaped species forms a raised mass which clasps dead branches with light brown, finger-like lobes.

Most commonly dead branches of prickly tea-tree (Leptospermum continentale), silky tea-tree (L. myrsinoides), silver banksia (Banksia marginata) and more recently on Yarra Burgan (Kunzea leptospermoides). It has also been found on dead and living scented paperbark (Melaleuca squarrosa). The immediate substrate is a Brown Paint Fungus (Hymenochaete sp.) and likely Phellinus sp.

Fruit body length to 60 mm; a raised mass, strongly lobed; margin irregular. Lobes to 10 mm wide, clasping substrate; brown, tips of lobes paler yellowish-brown; older specimens often have white, powdery areas.

== Distribution & conservation ==
This species of Hypocreopsis was discovered at Arthurs Pass National Park, Canterbury in 1983 in South Island of New Zealand and in 1992 in Nyora, Victoria Australia during a survey of vascular plants. This fungus has previously been referred to as Hypocreopsis sp. and Hypocreopsis sp. 'Nyora' in the Australian literature. In Victoria, H. amplectens (common name Tea-tree Fingers) has been classified as "vulnerable" under the Victorian Flora and Fauna Guarantee Act 1988, and the Adams Creek Conservation Reserve west of Nyora, was created partly because of its occurrence there.

Recent work to raise the profile of Tea-tree Fingers (Hypocreopsis amplectens) including an educational booklet produced by Fungimap in 2016 resulted in a fourth site being found in the Victorian Yarra Valley by the Fungi Group of the Victorian Field Naturalists Club in 2017. This new population has had the largest number of individual fruiting bodies recorded on new host plant the Yarra Burgan (Kunzea leptospermoides). Since 2016 repeated visits the Adams Creek and Grantville Nature Conservation Reserves have confirmed small populations survive, however recent surveys of the original location in Greens Bush, on the Mornington Peninsula have resulted in no sightings.

Observations based on photographs indicate that this species was observed in 2006 at Hamner Forest Park, Canterbury of the South Island New Zealand and in 2015 the New England National Park, New South Wales Australia. Despite identification information about this species being available since 2005, Tea-tree Fingers (Hypocreopsis amplectens) is confirmed from only three sites of 5 sites in the since 2016 in Australia, making it a rare fungus eligible for inclusion on national threat status lists in Australia and two sites New Zealand.
