= Trichoderma paucisporum =

Scientific classification
- Domain: Eukaryota
- Kingdom: Fungi
- Division: Ascomycota
- Class: Sordariomycetes
- Order: Hypocreales
- Family: Hypocreaceae
- Genus: Trichoderma
- Species: T. paucisporum

Binomial name
- Trichoderma paucisporum Samuels et al., 2006

Species of fungus

Trichoderma paucisporum is a species of endophytic fungus in the family Hypocreaceae. It was first isolated in Ecuador from cacao pods infected with frosty pod rot, Moniliophthora roreri. It produces a volatile antibiotic that inhibits development of M. roreri.
