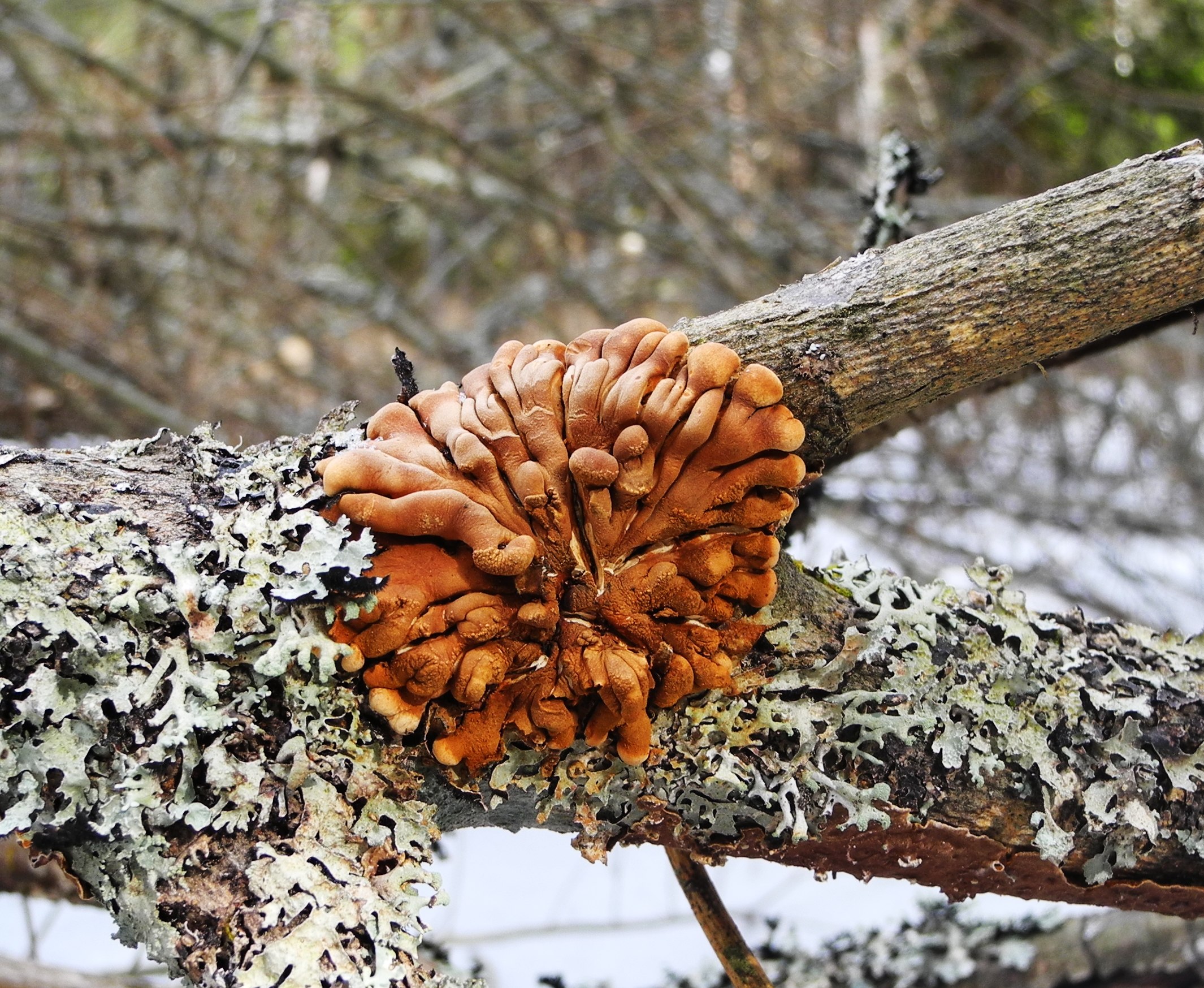

Scientific classification
- Kingdom: Fungi
- Division: Ascomycota
- Class: Sordariomycetes
- Order: Hypocreales
- Family: Hypocreaceae
- Genus: Hypocreopsis
- Species: H. lichenoides

Binomial name
- Hypocreopsis lichenoides (Tode) Seaver

Synonyms
- Acrospermum lichenoides Tode, Fung. mecklenb. sel. (Lüneburg) 1: 9 (1790); Dozya riccioidea (Bolton) P. Karst., Bidr. Känn. Finl. Nat. Folk 23: 28, 221 (1873); Hypocrea lichenoides (Tode) Ellis & Everh., N. Amer. Pyren. (Newfield): 87 (1892); Hypocrea parmelioides Mont., Syll. gen. sp. crypt. (Paris): 210 (1856); Hypocrea riccioidea (Bolton) Berk., Outl. Brit. Fung. (London): 383 (1860); Hypocreopsis riccioidea (Bolton) P. Karst., Bidr. Känn. Finl. Nat. Folk 23: [251] (1873); Sphaeria riccioidea Bolton, Hist. fung. Halifax, App. (Huddersfield) 3: 182, tab. 182 (1792) [1791]

= Hypocreopsis lichenoides =

Species of fungus

Hypocreopsis lichenoides is part of the family Hypocreaceae and genus Hypocreopsis, a group of fungi that form ascomata on the stems of trees and shrubs. The ascomata are orange-brown and consist of radiating, perithecial lobes. It is commonly known as willow gloves due to the resemblance of the ascocarp to rubber gloves, and because it is usually found on willow trees.

== Description ==
Ascocarp

Usually single, rarely in groups. Leafy, flat, soft, wide usually to 3,6 cm, rarely to 11 cm and 2–4 (5) mm thick. It consists of radially growing or singular perithecial lobes with finger-like tips on the edge. The surface is light brown through orange-brown or yellow-brown to ochre, with a lighter edge. Young fruiting bodies are smooth, sometimes wrinkled in the middle, mature have many ostioles.

Microscopic traits

Apothecia dimensions (18–) 22–30 × 6–9 μm, narrowly cylindrical, 8-spored, ascospores in one row, ellipsoid to short-fusiform, 1-septate spores.

== Habitat ==
Grows on branches of Salix aurita, Salix cinerea, was also noted on Prunus padus, Frangula alnus, Sambucus racemosa and others. It is thought to be a parasitic fungus growing on fruiting bodies of Hymenochaete tabacina (willow glue), in Poland it was noted with that fungus, but also on decaying wood with unidentified preexisting white rot, which may or may not have been caused by Hymenochaete tabacina.

== Distribution & conservation ==
Hypocreopsis lichenoides is known to grow in North America, Europe, Russia, Japan and Argentine. It's the most frequent in Europe.

Recent work to raise the profile of willow gloves and conserve them in Great Britain resulted in specimens from the last Scotland locations being translocated carefully to Cumbria, where the fungus was last recorded before its extinction in England about 50 years ago.
