= Trichoderma asperellum =

Scientific classification
- Domain: Eukaryota
- Kingdom: Fungi
- Division: Ascomycota
- Class: Sordariomycetes
- Order: Hypocreales
- Family: Hypocreaceae
- Genus: Trichoderma
- Species: T. asperellum

Binomial name
- Trichoderma asperellum Samuels, Lieckf. & Nirenberg 1999

Species of fungus

Trichoderma asperellum Samuels, Lieckf & Nirenberg is a species of fungus in the family Hypocreaceae. It can be distinguished from T. viride by molecular and phenotypic characteristics. The most important molecular characteristics are divergent ITS-1 and 28S sequences and RFLP's of the endochitinase gene. Main phenotypic characters are conidial ornamentation and arrangement and branching of the conidiophores.

== Important isolates ==
This species has been used commercially and experimentally as a biopesticide for plant disease control: some commercial isolates were previously placed in T. harzianum.
