= WBD =

WBD may refer to:

- Warner Bros. Discovery, a defunct American mass media conglomerate (2022–2026)
- Whitley Bridge railway station, North Yorkshire, England (National Rail station code)
- Wimm-Bill-Dann Foods, large Russian yogurt and juice maker
- Witches' Broom Disease, caused by the fungus Moniliophthora perniciosa
- WMDT-DT2, a television station (channel 47 digital) licensed to Salisbury, Maryland, United States, using the fictional call sign WBD-TV
- World Book Day, an annual event organized by UNESCO to promote reading, publishing, and copyright
- WBD, UCI team code for the Bingoal WB Devo Team, a Belgian UCI continental racing team
