= Mycoparasitism =

Organism with the ability to parasitize fungi

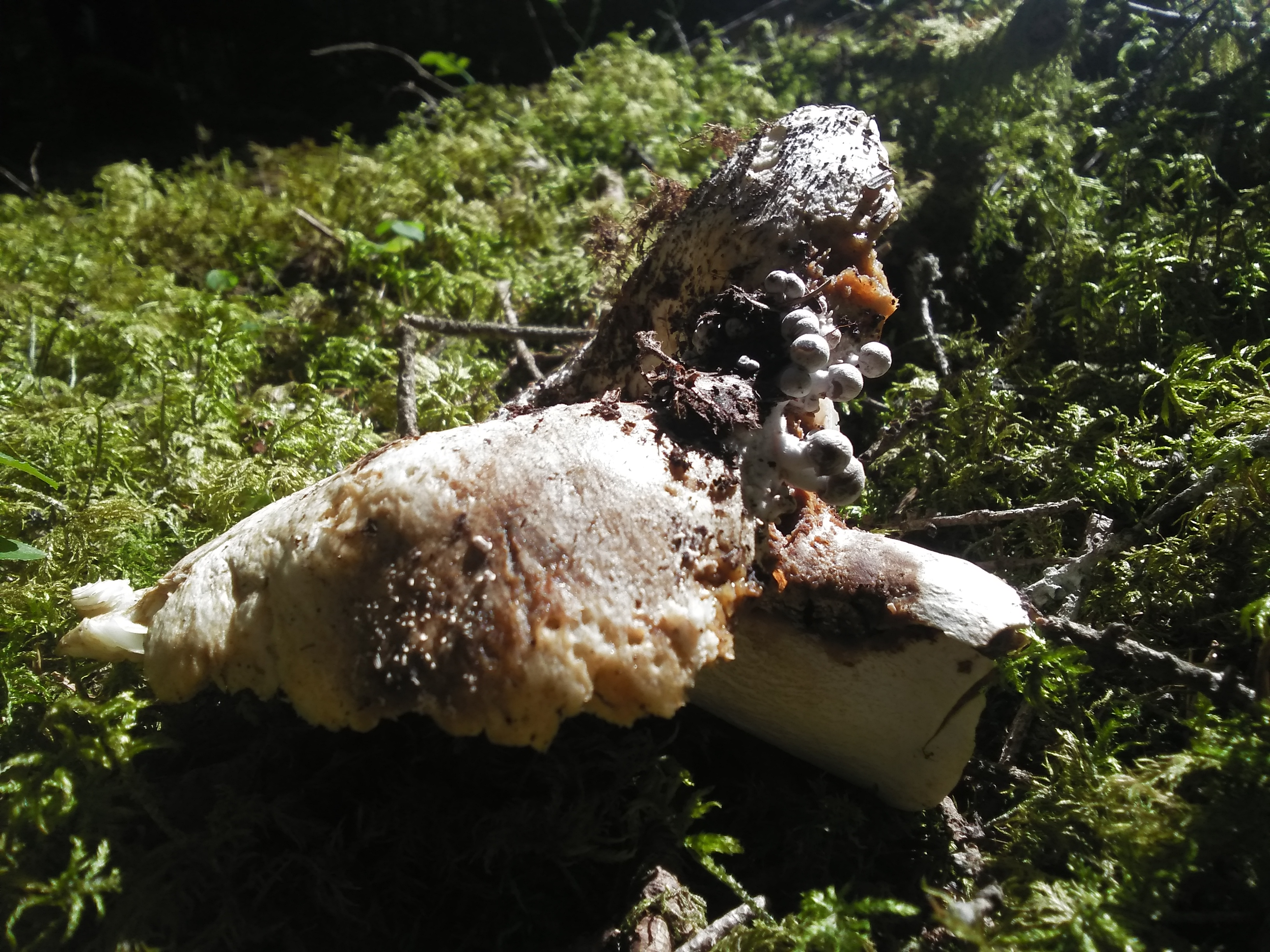
Mycoparasitic fungus Asterophora parasitica on Russula delica (La Chapelle-Geneste, Haute-Loire, France)

A mycoparasite is an organism with the ability to parasitize fungi.

Mycoparasites might be biotrophic or necrotrophic, depending on the type of interaction with their host.

== Types of mycoparasitic organisms ==
=== Myco-heterotrophy ===
Various plants may be considered mycoparasites, in that they parasitize and acquire most of their nutrition from fungi during a part or all of their life cycle. These include many orchid seedlings, as well as some plants that lack chlorophyll such as Monotropa uniflora. Mycoparasitic plants are more precisely described as myco-heterotrophs.

=== Mycoparasitic bacteria ===
Some bacteria live on or within fungal cells as parasites or symbionts.

=== Mycoparasitic viruses ===
Some viruses, called mycoviruses live on or within fungal cells as parasites or symbionts.

=== Mycoparasitic fungi ===
Many mycoparasites are fungi, though not all fungicolous fungi are parasites (some are commensals or saprobes.) Biotrophic mycoparasites acquire nutrients from living host cells. Necrotrophic mycoparasites rely on dead host cells, which they might first kill with toxins or enzymes (saprophytic growth).

== Kinds of mycoparasitic interactions ==
=== Biotrophic and necrotrophic mycoparasites ===
Biotrophic mycoparasites get nutrients from living host cells and growth of these parasites is greatly influenced by the metabolism of the host. Biotrophic mycoparasites tend to show high host specificity, and often form specialized infection structures. Necrotrophic mycoparasites can be aggressively antagonistic, invading the host fungus and killing, then digesting components of its cells. Necrotrophic parasites tend to have low host specificity, and are relatively unspecialized in their mechanism of parasitism.

=== Balanced and destructive mycoparasites ===
Balanced mycoparasites have little or no destructive effect on the host, whereas destructive mycoparasites have the opposite effect. Biotrophic mycoparasites are generally considered to be balanced mycoparasites; necrotrophic mycoparasites use toxins or enzymes to kill host cells, therefore necrotrophic mycoparasites are usually considered to be destructive mycoparasites. However, in some combinations, the parasite may live during its early development as a biotroph, then kill its host and act more like destructive mycoparasites in late stages of parasitization.

== Mechanisms of Mycoparasitism ==
The four main steps of mycoparasitism include target location; recognition; contact and penetration; and nutrient acquisition.

=== Target location ===
Many research indicate that hyphal growth direction, spore germination, and bud tube elongation of mycoparasitic fungi may exhibit tropism in response to detection of a potential host. This tropic recognition reaction is thought to arise from detection of signature chemicals of the host; the direction of the concentration gradient determines the growth direction of the parasite. As the mycoparasitic interaction is host-specific and not merely a contact response, it is likely that signals from the host fungus are recognized by mycoparasites such as Trichoderma and provoke transcription of mycoparasitism-related genes.

=== Recognition ===
When mycoparasites contact their fungal host, they will recognize each other. This recognition between mycoparasites and their host fungi may be related to the agglutinin on the cell surface of the mycohost. Carbohydrate residues on the cell wall of mycoparasites might bind to lectins on the surface of the host fungi to achieve mutual recognition.

=== Contact and penetration ===
Once a mycoparasitic fungus and its host recognize each other, both may exhibit changes in external form and internal structure. Different mycoparasitic fungi form different structures when interacting with their hosts. For example, the hyphae of some mycoparasitic fungi form specialized contact cells resembling haustoria on the hyphae of their hosts; others may coil around the hyphae of their host fungus or penetrate then grow inside host hyphae. Nectrophic mycoparasites may kill host hyphae with toxins or enzymes before invading them.

== Application ==
Mycoparasitic fungi can be important controls of plant disease fungi in natural systems and in agriculture, and may play a role in integrated pest management (IPM) as biological controls.

Some Trichoderma species have been developed as biocontrols of a range of commercially important diseases, and have been applied in the United States, India, Israel, New Zealand, Sweden, and other countries to control plant diseases caused by Rhizoctonia solani, Botrytis cinerea, Sclerotium rolfsii, Sclerotinia sclerotiorum, Pythium spp., and Fusarium spp. as a promising alternative to chemical pesticides.

Further study of mycoparasitism may drive discovery off more bioactive compounds including biopesticides and biofertilizers.

List of fungal bioagents with their trade and manufacturers name
Commercial products	Bioagents used	Name of the manufacturer
AQ10 biofungicide	Ampelomyces quisqualis isolate M-10	Ecogen, Inc. Israel
Anti-Fungus	Trichoderma spp.	Grondortsmettingen De Cuester, Belgium
Biofungus	Trichoderma spp.	Grondortsmettingen De Cuester n. V.Belgium
Bas-derma	Trichoderma viride	Basarass Biocontrol Res. Lab., India
Binab T	Trichoderma harzianum (ATCC 20476) and Trichoderma polysporum (ATCC 20475)	Bio-Innovation AB, UK
Bioderma	Trichoderma viride/T. harzianum	Biotech International Ltd., India
Biofox C	Fusarium oxysporum (Non- pathogenic)	S. I. A. P. A., Italy
Prestop, Prirnastop	Gliocladium catenulatum	Kemira Agro. Oy, Finland
Root Pro, Root Prota to Soilgard	Trichoderma harzianum/Gliocladium virens strain GL-21	Efal Agr, Israel Thermo Trilogy, USA
Root shield, Plant shield, T-22 Planter box	Trichoderma harzianum Rifai strain KRL-AG (T-22)	Bioworks Inc., USA
Supresivit	Trichoderma harzianum	Borregaard and Reitzel, Czech Republic
T-22 G, T-22 HB	Trichoderma harzianum strain KRL-AG2	THT Inc., USA
Trichodex, Trichopel	Trichoderma harzianum	Makhteshim Chemical Works Ltd., USA
Trichopel, Trichoject, Trichodowels, Trichoseal	Trichoderma harzianum and Trichoderma viride	Agrimm Technologies Ltd., New Zealand
Trichopel	Trichoderma harzianumand Trichoderma viride	Agrimm Technologies Ltd., New Zealand
Trichoderma 2000	Trichoderma sp.	Myocontrol Ltd., Israel
Tri-control	Trichoderma spp.	Jeypee Biotechs, India
Trieco	Trichoderma viride	Ecosense Labs Pvt. Ltd., Mumbai, India
TY	Trichoderma sp.	Mycocontrol, Israel
