= Trichoderma theobromicola =

Scientific classification
- Domain: Eukaryota
- Kingdom: Fungi
- Division: Ascomycota
- Class: Sordariomycetes
- Order: Hypocreales
- Family: Hypocreaceae
- Genus: Trichoderma
- Species: T. theobromicola

Binomial name
- Trichoderma theobromicola Samuels et al., 2006

Species of fungus

Trichoderma theobromicola is a species of endophytic fungus in the family Hypocreaceae. It was first isolated from the trunk of a healthy cacao tree in Amazonian Peru. It produces a volatile antibiotic that inhibits development of M. roreri.
