= Trichoderma ovalisporum =

Scientific classification
- Kingdom: Fungi
- Division: Ascomycota
- Class: Sordariomycetes
- Order: Hypocreales
- Family: Hypocreaceae
- Genus: Trichoderma
- Species: T. ovalisporum

Binomial name
- Trichoderma ovalisporum Samuels & Schroers 2004

Species of fungus

Trichoderma ovalisporum is a species of fungus. It has ovoidal conidia and a fast rate of growth at 30 °C. It has been considered for its biocontrol potential against Moniliophthora roreri.
