= Debarya =

Debarya may refer to:

- Debarya, a genus of algae in the family Zygnemataceae, synonym of Transeauina
- Debarya, a genus of fungi in the family Hypocreaceae, synonym of Hypocrea
