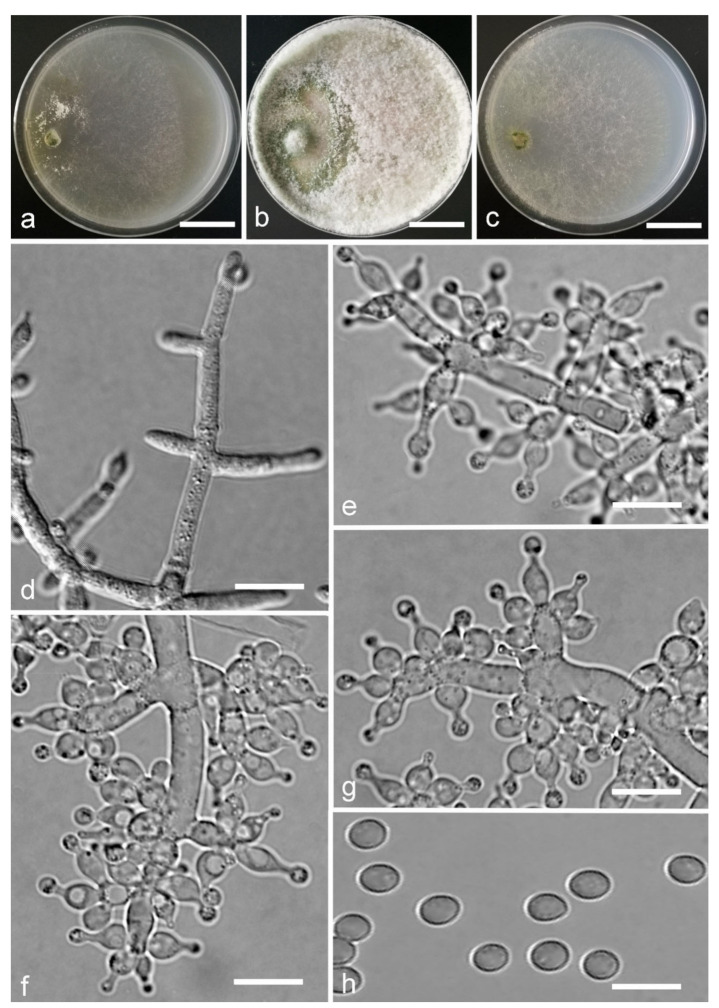
- Trichoderma asiaticum cultures (a–c) on various media. (d) Conidiophores (e–g) Conidiophores, phialides and conidia. (h) Conidia. Scale bars: (a–c) = 2.5 cm, (d–h) = 10 μm.

Scientific classification
- Kingdom: Fungi
- Division: Ascomycota
- Class: Sordariomycetes
- Order: Hypocreales
- Family: Hypocreaceae
- Genus: Trichoderma
- Species: T. asiaticum

Binomial name
- Trichoderma asiaticum Z.F. Yu & X. Du (2021)

= Trichoderma asiaticum =

Species of fungus

Trichoderma asiaticum is a fungus that was described from soil samples in China. T. asiaticum was isolated from environmental samples and characterized using morphological features and molecular phylogenetic analyses.

== Etymology ==
The specific epithet comes from the Latin word asiaticum.

== Taxonomy ==
The type species was collected in July of 2007 by Zefen Yu and Yifan Lv in Luliang county, Yunnan province, China at an elevation of 1800 m (24°57'22.0"N 103°46'30.0"E). It was then sequenced and formally described in 2021 by Zefen Yu and Xing Du. The type specimen (holotype YMF 1.00352) is stored at the Conservation and Utilization of Bio-Resources in Yunnan, in a metabolically inactive state (deep freezing). The ex-type culture is stored at the China General Microbiological Culture Collection Center (CGMCC 3.19085), and has a MycoBank# of 825470.1

T. asiaticum is closely related phylogenetically to T. guizhouense, T. pholiotae, T. pseudoasiaticum, and T. simile in the complex Harzianum Clade Complex.
