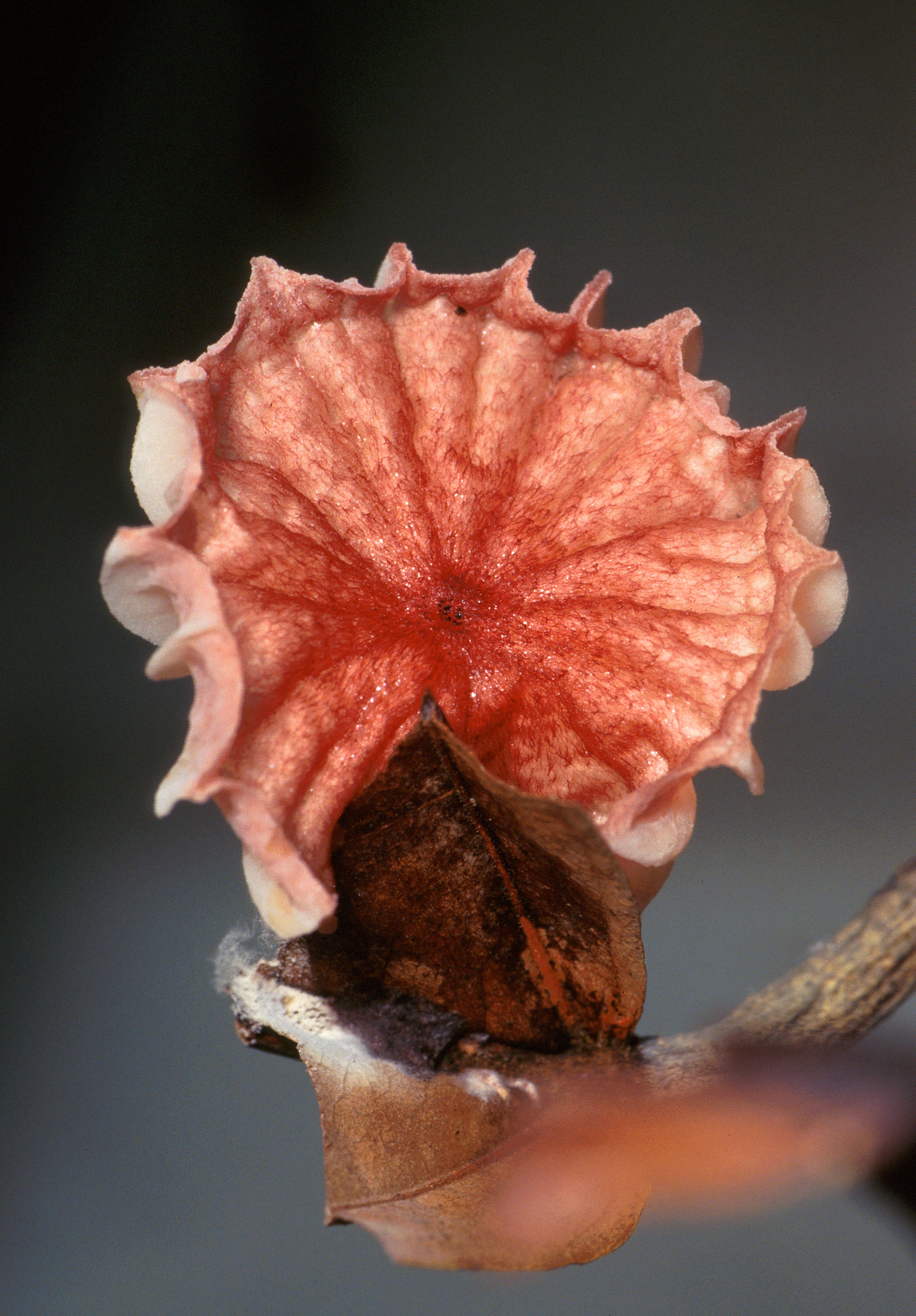

Scientific classification
- Domain: Eukaryota
- Kingdom: Fungi
- Division: Basidiomycota
- Class: Agaricomycetes
- Order: Agaricales
- Family: Marasmiaceae
- Genus: Moniliophthora
- Species: M. perniciosa

Binomial name
- Moniliophthora perniciosa (Stahel) Aime & Phillips-Mora, (2005)

Synonyms
- Crinipellis perniciosa (Stahel) Singer, (1943); Crinipellis perniciosa var. perniciosa (Stahel) Singer, (1943); Marasmius perniciosus Stahel, (1915)

= Moniliophthora perniciosa =

Species of fungus

Moniliophthora perniciosa (previously Crinipellis perniciosa) is a fungus that causes "witches' broom disease" (WBD) of the cocoa tree T. cacao. This pathogen is currently limited to South America, Panama and the Caribbean, and is perhaps one of the best-known cocoa diseases, thought to have co-evolved with cocoa in its centre of origin (first recorded in the Brazilian Amazon in 1785).

This fungus is hemibiotroph, with two characteristic phases: biotrophic (expanding and infecting, on living tissue) and saprotrophic (producing basidiospores, on necrotic tissue). The biotrophic stage, and what triggers its switch to a saprotrophic stage, are still not understood.

== Hosts and symptoms ==
Moniliophthora perniciosa can infect a number of hosts. Generally, M. perniciosa infects tropical host plants, and host plants in the Upper Amazon River basin on the eastern side of the Andes. M. perniciosa is now known to comprise four different biotypes (C, S, L and H), each infecting different (and unrelated) host plants. The economically important C-biotype infects species of Theobroma and Herrania (family Malvaceae).

A second biotype (L-biotype) was found on liana vines in Ecuador; subsequently the host was identified as Arrabidaea verrucosa (Bignoniaceae) but witches' broom symptoms have not been observed on this host. The S-biotype, reported only from Brazil caused witches' broom symptoms on hosts within the family Solanaceae, including Solanum rugosum; . Under experimental conditions, this biotype is also able to cause witches' broom symptoms on tomato, aubergine, pepper and potato. Most recently discovered is the H-biotype, which infects Heteropterys acutifolia (Malpighiaceae) but this has been reclassified as a separate species, Moniliophthora brasiliensis. Recent phylogenetic analysis of field-collected basidiomes and cultures suggests that other biotypes may also exist.

Investigation of the breeding biology of these various biotypes found that those causing disease symptoms (C,S) are non-outcrossing (primary homothallic), wherein a single uninucleate basidiospore is capable of completing its life cycle. This is crucial in the epidemiology of disease since a single spore infection can be fertile. Primary homothallism is highly unusual amongst agaric fungi which are outcrossing, requiring mating between mycelia derived from single spore germlings (monokaryons) to form a dikaryon which is capable of basidiome formation. The L-biotype, in contrast to its relatives exhibits a bifactorial outcrossing mechanism.

Infection of M. perniciosa on T. cacao causes Witches’ Broom Disease (WBD), which show distinctive symptoms of hypertrophy and hyperplasia of distal tissue of the infection site, loss of apical dominance, proliferation of auxiliary shoots, and the formation of abnormal stems resulting in a broom-like structure called a green broom. Infection of flower cushions results in the formation of cushion brooms and reduces the ability to produce viable pods, causing seedless pods, or in other words, parthenocarpic fruits. Parthenocarpy results in M. perniciosa targeting nutrient acquisition while altering the host physiology without causing significant necrosis. After 1–2 months post infection, necrosis of infected tissues occurs distal to the original infection site, forming a structure called a dry broom. WBD may also lead to plant death after successive attacks of M. perniciosa. Signs of M. perniciosa infection are green brooms, which are broom-like structures that are formed from the stem, and highly infective mushrooms formed on pods and affected vegetative tissue, which are small and pink. It is possible to cultivate these basidiomata under experimental conditions on a bran-vermiculite medium using the 'pie-dish' method to simulate the wetting/drying conditions experienced by the fungus under field conditions.

== Environment ==
M. perniciosa evolved in the Amazon and its susceptible hosts are tropical plants located in rain forests. Favorable conditions for the disease to spread are humid, warm tropical weather. The spores of this fungus are spread by wind, but must land in water in order to germinate. As a consequence, it mainly spreads during rainy periods. In most cacao production areas, rainfall totals and temperature maximums range between 1300 and 3000 mm and 30 to 33 °C. These conditions are ideal for WBD development.

== Disease management ==
Generally, there are four major strategies that can be used for disease control of Witches’ Broom. One strategy is phytosanitation, which is the removal and destruction of diseased plant parts. This can only be conducted during dry periods, or one risks spreading the disease further. Other strategies for control are chemical control, genetic resistance and biological control. Genetic resistance is currently being researched. In order to achieve durable resistance to a specific pathogen, extensive knowledge of the genetics of specific host-pathogen interaction is required. Host-pathogen interaction for M. perniciosa is not fully known. Some of these strategies can be tedious and expensive, for example, 95% phytosanitation is required to achieve 50% reduction in pod loss. Among the endophytic fungi associated with cacao are many species of Trichoderma. Several species of Trichoderma have been isolated from cacao and is one of the most often used biofungicides. One of the isolates, T. stromaticum parasitizes the saprotrophic mycelium and basidiocarps of M. perniciosa, which reduces the formation of basidiocarps by 99% when brooms are in contact with soil and 56% in brooms remaining on trees. It can reduce pod infection by 31%. This biofungicide has shown variable performance due to environmental conditions of high humidity and moisture from rainfall, which is ideal for disease development, but not necessarily ideal for optimizing biocontrol efficacy.

== Importance ==
M. perniciosa infection causes young pods to become deformed (these are called chirimoyas in Spanish), whereas infection of more mature pods will cause necrosis of seeds and render the pod worthless. This largely affects cocoa production in South American countries where their cash crop is cacao beans. In 1989, WBD was introduced to the cocoa producing state of Bahia of Brazil, where output diminished from 380,000 metric tons per year to 90,000 metric tons in the late 1990s. Due to this disease, Bahia, Brazil went from being the 3rd largest exporter of cacao beans to a net importer. Lack of cacao beans could increase the price for importing countries, and also for all cocoa products. The U.S. currently imports $100 million in cacao beans annually.

T. cacao L. is an understorey tropical plant, and the understorey growth of cacao helps to preserve habitat for numerous animal and bird species in these regions. With the production losses associated with WBD, tropical landowners are forced to convert their land to other production systems that usually require the destruction of the forest cover. WBD does not only affect the supply of cacao, but also largely impacts the conservation of tropical environment where cacao is grown.
