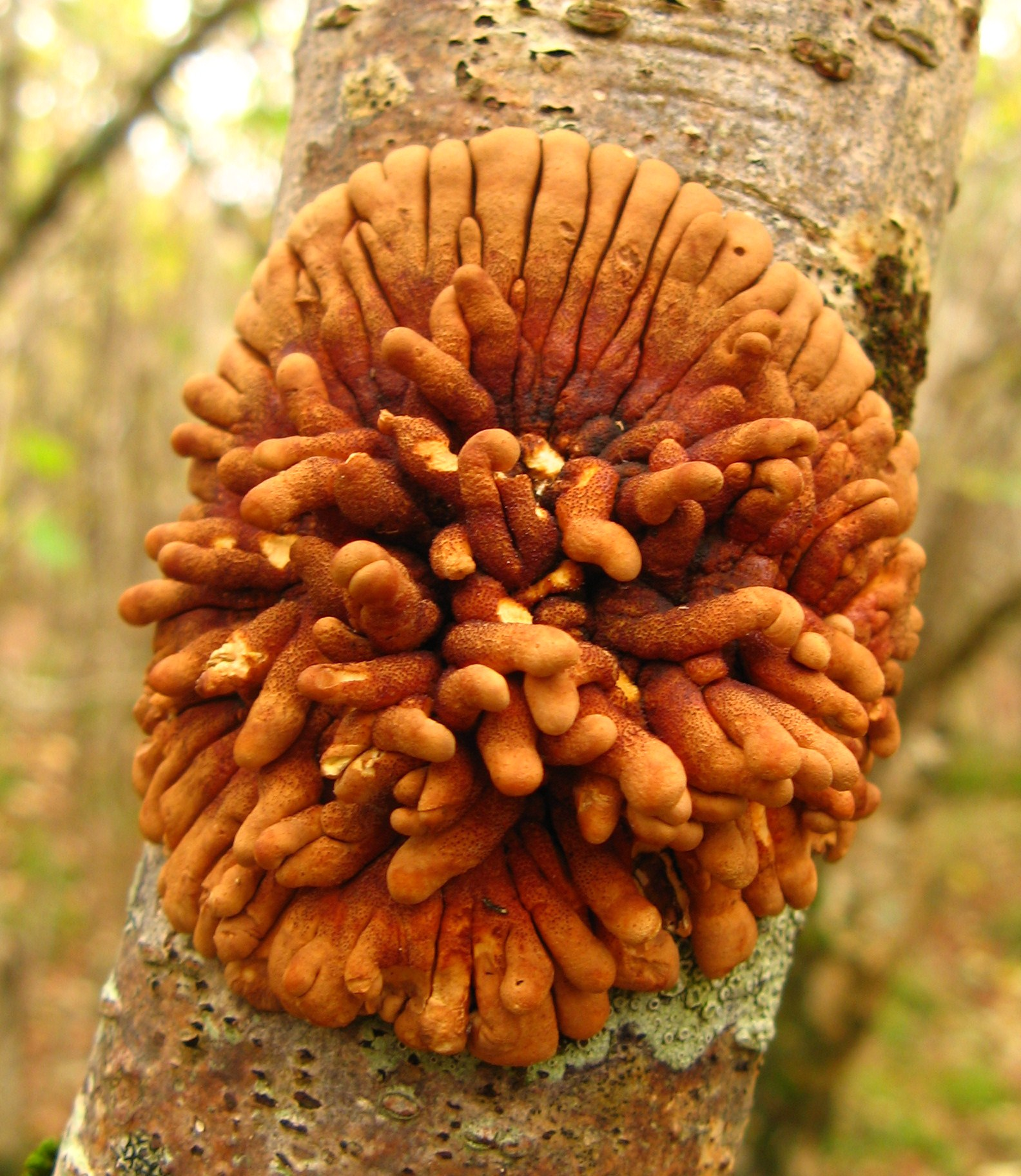
- Hypocreopsis rhododendri on a hazel tree.

Scientific classification
- Domain: Eukaryota
- Kingdom: Fungi
- Division: Ascomycota
- Class: Sordariomycetes
- Order: Hypocreales
- Family: Hypocreaceae
- Genus: Hypocreopsis; P.Karst (1873)

Type species
- Hypocreopsis lichenoides (Tode) Seaver (1910)

= Hypocreopsis =

Genus of fungi

Hypocreopsis is a genus of ascomycete fungi that form ascomata on the stems of trees and shrubs. The ascomata are orange-brown and consist of radiating, perithecial lobes.

== Species ==
The genus includes three species:

- Hypocreopsis amplectens
- Hypocreopsis lichenoides
- Hypocreopsis rhododendri

The fruiting bodies of these species are macroscopically similar, other than the fact that H. lichenoides may develop brown mealy patches of conidia on the surface. The species may however be distinguished by their spore morphology: H. lichenoides has ellipsoid to short-fusiform, 1-septate spores; H. rhododendri has globose, 0-1 septate spores, and H. amplectens has cylindric, 2-3 septate spores.

== Distribution ==
Hypocreopsis amplectens and H. rhododendri are restricted to an oceanic climate. Hypocreopsis rhododendri occurs on the western fringe of Europe, and has also been recorded historically from the Appalachian mountains in the eastern USA, and H. amplectens has been found at just four sites in Australia and New Zealand.

Hypocreopsis lichenoides is found across a wider climatic range, occurring in temperate-to-polar climates across the northern hemisphere.
