= Bisvertinolone =

Names
- Preferred IUPAC name (4S,4aR,5aS,9Z,9aR,9bS)-2-[(2E,4E)-Hexa-2,4-dienoyl]-4,4a,8-trihydroxy-9-[(2E,4E)-1-hydroxyhexa-2,4-dien-1-ylidene]-4,5a,7,9b-tetramethyl-4a,9,9a,9b-tetrahydrodibenzo[b,d]furan-3,6(4H,5aH)-dione

Identifiers
3D model (JSmol)	Interactive image
ChEMBL	ChEMBL464576
ChemSpider	24693339
PubChem CID	44584013
- InChI: InChI=1S/C28H32O8/c1-7-9-11-13-18(29)17-15-25(4)22-20(19(30)14-12-10-8-2)21(31)16(3)23(32)26(22,5)36-28(25,35)27(6,34)24(17)33/h7-15,22,31-32,34-35H,1-6H3/b9-7+,10-8+,13-11+,14-12+/t22-,25+,26+,27+,28-/m1/s1 Key: LWSINBJYBUDMIK-KVPLBEEKSA-N; InChI=1/C28H32O8/c1-7-9-11-13-18(29)17-15-25(4)22-20(19(30)14-12-10-8-2)21(31)16(3)23(32)26(22,5)36-28(25,35)27(6,34)24(17)33/h7-15,22,31-32,34-35H,1-6H3/b9-7+,10-8+,13-11+,14-12+/t22-,25+,26+,27+,28-/m1/s1 Key: LWSINBJYBUDMIK-KVPLBEEKBY
- SMILES: C/C=C/C=C/C(=O)C1=C[C@]2([C@H]3/C(=C(\C=C\C=C\C)/O)/C(=C(C(=O)[C@]3(O[C@]2([C@@](C1=O)(C)O)O)C)C)O)C

Properties
Chemical formula	C_{28}H_{32}O_{8}
Molar mass	496.556 g·mol^{−1}
- Except where otherwise noted, data are given for materials in their standard state (at 25 °C [77 °F], 100 kPa). Infobox references

Bisvertinolone is an anticancer metabolite of Trichoderma.
