= PaNie =

PaNie is a 25 kDa protein produced by the root rot disease-causing pathogen Pythium aphanidermatum. It stands for Pythium aphanidermatum Necrosis inducing elicitor. PaNie (a.k.a. NLP_{Pya}) belongs to a family of elicitors named the Nep1-like proteins (NLPs), which cause necrosis when injected into the leaves of dicotyledonous plants.
