= Trichoderma stromaticum =

Scientific classification
- Domain: Eukaryota
- Kingdom: Fungi
- Division: Ascomycota
- Class: Sordariomycetes
- Order: Hypocreales
- Family: Hypocreaceae
- Genus: Trichoderma
- Species: T. stromaticum

Binomial name
- Trichoderma stromaticum Samuels & Pardo-Schulth. 2000

Species of fungus

Trichoderma stromaticum is a species of fungus in the family Hypocreaceae. It is a parasite of the cacao witches broom pathogen and has been used in its biological control.
