= Trichoderma hamatum =

Scientific classification
- Domain: Eukaryota
- Kingdom: Fungi
- Division: Ascomycota
- Class: Sordariomycetes
- Order: Hypocreales
- Family: Hypocreaceae
- Genus: Trichoderma
- Species: T. hamatum

Binomial name
- Trichoderma hamatum (Bonord.) Bainier 1906

Synonyms
- Phymatotrichum hamatum (Bonord.) Oudem. 1903; Pachybasium hamatum (Bonord.) Sacc. 1885; Verticillium hamatum Bonord. 1851

Species of fungus

Trichoderma hamatum is a species of fungus in the family Hypocreaceae. It has been used a biological control of certain plant diseases, including Sclerotinia lettuce drop caused by Sclerotinia minor.
