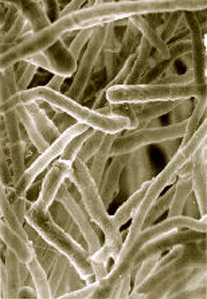

Scientific classification
- Kingdom: Fungi
- Division: Ascomycota
- Class: Sordariomycetes
- Order: Hypocreales
- Family: Hypocreaceae
- Genus: Trichoderma
- Species: T. reesei

Binomial name
- Trichoderma reesei Simmons, 1977

= Trichoderma reesei =

Species of fungus

Trichoderma reesei is a mesophilic and filamentous fungus. It is an anamorph of the fungus Hypocrea jecorina. T. reesei can secrete large amounts of cellulolytic enzymes (cellulases and hemicellulases). Microbial cellulases have industrial application in the conversion of cellulose, a major component of plant biomass, into glucose.

T. reesei isolate QM6a was originally isolated from the Solomon Islands during World War II because of its degradation of canvas and garments of the US army. All strains currently used in biotechnology and basic research were derived from this isolate.

Recent advances in the biochemistry of cellulase enzymology, the mechanism of cellulose hydrolysis (cellulolysis), strain improvement, molecular cloning and process engineering are bringing T. reesei cellulases closer to being a commercially viable route to cellulose hydrolysis. Several industrially useful strains have been developed and characterised, e.g. Rut-C30, RL-P37 and MCG-80. The genome was released in 2008. T. reesei has a mating type-dependent characterised sexual cycle.

== Sexual development ==
T. reesei QM6a has a MAT1-2 mating type locus. The discovery of the opposite mating type, MAT1-1, was reported in 2009, proving that T. reesei is a heterothallic species. After being regarded as asexual since its discovery more than 50 years ago, sexual reproduction can now be induced in T. reesei QM6a leading to formation of fertilized stromata and mature ascospores.

== Use in industry ==
T. reesei is an important commercial and industrial micro-organism due to its cellulase production ability. Industrial enzymes, like T. reesei, have become an essential part of the global market. As of 2012, the estimated market size for industrial enzymes reached almost 4 billion in US dollars. Many strains of T. reesei have been developed since its discovery, with heavy emphasis on increasing cellulase production. These improvement programs originally consisted of classical (ionising-radiation-based and chemical-based) mutagenesis, which led to strains capable of producing 20 times as much cellulase as QM6a.

The ultimate aim in the creation of hypercellulolytic strains was to obtain a carbon catabolite derepressed strain. This derepression would allow the T. reesei strain to produce cellulases under any set of growth conditions, even in the presence of glucose. However, with the advent of modern genetic engineering tools such as targeted deletion, targeted knockout, and more, a new generation of strains dubbed "hyperproducers" has emerged. Some of the highest performing industrial strains produce up to 100 grams of cellulases per litre, more than 3 times as much as the RUT-C30 strain (which itself produces twice as much as the parent strain NG14 from which it was derived).

T. reesei is used in the production of biofuels. This fungi helps to efficiently break down biomass into biofuels for industrial applications. T. reesei accomplishes this by breaking down complex sugars, like cellulose, into simple sugars. Several institutions and studies have been accomplished to explore possibilities of understanding and manipulating this process in order to boost the development of ethanol as an economic alternative to other fuel sources. With the present enzyme cocktails in use, the cost per gallon of ethanol may be too high to be considered a competitive alternative to other fuel sources. To make these biofuels economically viable, it may be necessary to improve not only the enzyme production process, but also to optimize the costs for all other steps of the process including pretreatment, hydrolysis, and fermentation.

T. reesei is used in the creation of stonewashed jeans. The cellulase produced by the fungus partially degrades the cotton material in places, making it soft and causing the jeans to look as if they had been washed using stones.

T. reesei has been commercially used for this process, sometimes called biostoning. T. reesei contains four main celluloytic enzymes, which are EGII/Cel5A, CBHII/Cel6A, CBHI/Cel7A, and EGI/Cel7B. The EGII/Cel5A specifically was able to better remove the coloring of denim than other enzymes in T. reesei.

The use of T. reesei in textiles has recently expanded to include general laundry detergents. T. reesei, when used in laundry detergents, has rejuvenating properties that improve the color brightness, feel, dirt removal, and pilling in cotton fabrics. T. reesei is able to accomplish this by modifying the cellulosic yarn surface of cotton fabrics and garments. In the case of fabric de-pilling, cellulolytic cocktails containing the fungi hydrolyze cellulose in the fibers to achieve a de-pilling effect. The enzymes EGII/Cel5A and EGI/Cel7B were shown to remove more pill than the main enzymes (CBHI/Cel7A and CBHII/Cel6A), which actually showed little de-pilling abilities.

T. reesei is viewed as an emerging platform for biotechnology applications, as engineered organisms have proven capable of secreting high levels of recombinant protein in place of native enzymes. Recombinant fungus could provide a sustainable alternative to animals for production of substances like egg protein. Studies show that the use of T. reesei in creating egg protein substitutes could reduce carbon emissions and other negative environmental impacts associated with traditional egg-white powder production. Companies like Onego Bio have already begun experimenting with the commercial production of animal-free egg protein with the assistance of T. reesei.

Like other trichoderma variants, T. reesei has also shown to be useful in brewery and winemaking because the enzymes within the fungus improved fermentation. Furthermore, the T. reesei enzymes EGII and CBHII specifically improved the wine viscosity; in the United States, the fungus was also used to reduce the viscosity of worts.

In the food and feed industry, T. reesei and other trichoderma variants have proven to be an invaluable resource for the production processes and qualitative integrity for feed cereals and food/vegetable extractions. The cell walls of cereal crops (which primarily include wheat, barley, oats, and rye) are highly indigestible due to the presence of non starch polysaccharides. T. reesei and other trichoderma variants help to partially hydrolyze these crops and improve nutritional quality as well as digestibility. Increased demand for higher quality olive oil in recent years led to the development of specific cocktails including pectinases, hemicellulases, and cellulolytic preparation from T. reesei to facilitate the cold extraction of olive oil.

== See also ==
- Cellobiohydrolase (CBH)
- Cellulosic ethanol
- Endoglucanase (EG)
