= Cellobiohydrolase =

Cellobiohydrolase may refer to:

- Cellulase, an enzyme
- Cellulose 1,4-beta-cellobiosidase, an enzyme
