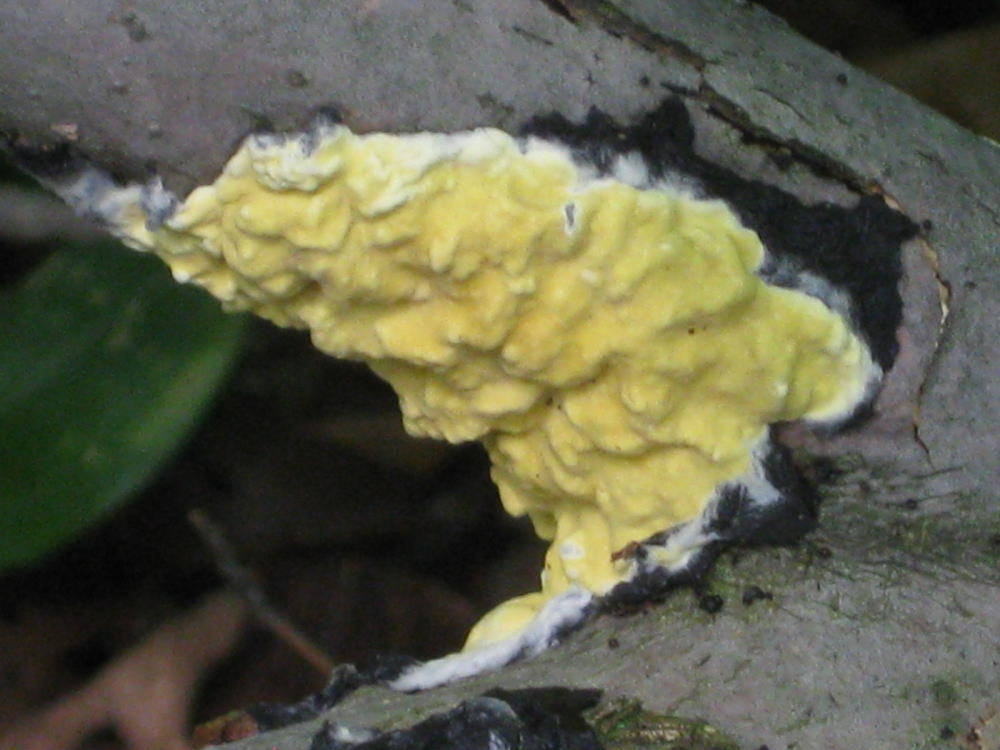
- Hypocrea sulphurea

Scientific classification
- Kingdom: Fungi
- Division: Ascomycota
- Class: Sordariomycetes
- Order: Hypocreales
- Family: Hypocreaceae
- Genus: Hypocrea; Fr. (1825)

Type species
- Hypocrea rufa (Pers.) Fr. (1849)

Species
- 171, see text

Synonyms
- Creopus Link (1833); Debarya Schulzer (1866)

= Hypocrea =

Genus of fungi

Hypocrea is a genus of fungi in the family Hypocreaceae. The widespread genus is estimated to contain 171 species that grow on rotten wood, and are often associated with other fungi. Anamorphic genera associated with Hypocrea include Acremonium, Gliocladium, Trichoderma, and Verticillium. Hypocrea was circumscribed by mycologist Elias Fries in 1825. Due to changes within the code of nomenclature, the genus Trichoderma has been proposed for conservation over its teleomorph Hypocrea. This means that all species with both a Hypocrea and Trichoderma name will be officially known by their Trichoderma name, and any species only described as Hypocrea will be transferred to Trichoderma.

== Species ==
- Hypocrea americana
- Hypocrea andinensis
- Hypocrea argillacea
- Hypocrea atrogelatinosa
- Hypocrea atroviridis
- Hypocrea aurantia
- Hypocrea aurantiaca
- Hypocrea aureoviridis
- Hypocrea austrokoningii
- Hypocrea carnea
- Hypocrea ceramica
- Hypocrea cerebriformis
- Hypocrea citrina
- Hypocrea colensoi
- Hypocrea coprosmae
- Hypocrea cornea
- Hypocrea corticioides
- Hypocrea crassa
- Hypocrea cremea
- Hypocrea cupularis
- Hypocrea dichromospora
- Hypocrea dorotheae
- Hypocrea egmontensis
- Hypocrea eucorticioides
- Hypocrea gelatinosa
- Hypocrea hunua
- Hypocrea jecorina
- Hypocrea koningii
- Hypocrea lactea
- Hypocrea lacuwombatensis
- Hypocrea lenta
- Hypocrea lixii
- Hypocrea lutea
- Hypocrea macrospora
- Hypocrea manuka
- Hypocrea minutispora
- Hypocrea muroiana
- Hypocrea nebulosa
- Hypocrea neorufa
- Hypocrea nigricans
- Hypocrea novae-zelandiae
- Hypocrea orientalis
- Hypocrea pachybasioides
- Hypocrea pallida
- Hypocrea parapilulifera
- Hypocrea patella
- Hypocrea pezizoides
- Hypocrea phyllostachydis
- Hypocrea pilulifera
- Hypocrea placentula
- Hypocrea poronioidea
- Hypocrea protopulvinata
- Hypocrea pseudokoningii
- Hypocrea psychrophila
- Hypocrea pulvinata
- Hypocrea saccharina
- Hypocrea schweinitzii
- Hypocrea semiorbis
- Hypocrea spinulosa
- Hypocrea splendens
- Hypocrea stellata
- Hypocrea stilbohypoxyli
- Hypocrea strictipilosa
- Hypocrea strobilina
- Hypocrea subalpina
- Hypocrea sublibera
- Hypocrea subsplendens
- Hypocrea sulfurella
- Hypocrea sulphurea
- Hypocrea tawa
- Hypocrea toro
- Hypocrea tremelloides
- Hypocrea vinosa
- Hypocrea virens
- Hypocrea viridescens
