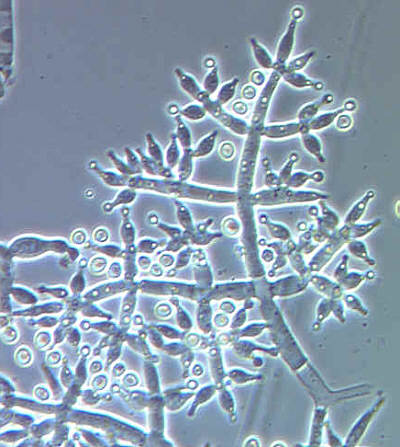
- T. harzianum

Scientific classification
- Kingdom: Fungi
- Division: Ascomycota
- Class: Sordariomycetes
- Order: Hypocreales
- Family: Hypocreaceae
- Genus: Trichoderma; Pers. (1801)

Type species
- Trichoderma fuliginoides Pers. (1801)

Species
- see List of Trichoderma species

= Trichoderma =

Genus of fungi

Trichoderma is a genus of fungi in the family Hypocreaceae that is present in all soils, where they are the most prevalent culturable fungi. Many species in this genus can be characterized as opportunistic avirulent plant symbionts. This refers to the ability of several Trichoderma species to form mutualistic endophytic relationships with several plant species. Trichoderma species are also responsible for green mold disease in mushroom cultivation. The genomes of several Trichoderma species have been sequenced and are publicly available from the JGI.

== Taxonomy ==
The genus was described by Christiaan Hendrik Persoon in 1794, but the taxonomy has remained difficult to resolve. For a long time, it was considered to consist of only one species, Trichoderma viride, named for producing green mold.

=== Subdivision ===
In 1991, Bissett divided the genus into five sections, partly based on the aggregate species described by Rifai:

- Pachybasium (20 species)
- Longibrachiatum (21 species)
- Trichoderma
- Saturnisporum (2 species)
- Hypocreanum

With the advent of molecular markers from 1995 onwards, Bissett's scheme was largely confirmed but Saturnisporum was merged with Longibrachiatum. While Longibrachiatum and Hypocreanum appeared monophyletic, Pachybasium was determined to be paraphyletic, many of its species clustering with Trichoderma. Druzhina and Kubicek (2005) confirmed the genus as circumscribed was holomorphic. They identified 88 species which they demonstrated could be assigned to two major clades. Consequently, the formal description of sections has been largely replaced by informal descriptions of clades, such as the Aureoviride clade or the Gelatinosum clade.

=== Species ===
The belief that Trichoderma was monotypic persisted until the 1969 work of Rifai, who recognised nine species. There are currently 89 accepted species in the genus Trichoderma. Hypocrea are teleomorphs of Trichoderma, with Trichoderma being the anamorphs of Hypocrea.

== Characteristics ==
Cultures are typically fast-growing at 25–30 °C (77–86 °F), but some species of Trichoderma will grow at 45 °C (113 °F). Colonies are transparent at first on media such as cornmeal dextrose agar (CMD) or white on richer media such as potato dextrose agar (PDA). Mycelium are not typically obvious on CMD, conidia typically form within one week in compact or loose tufts in shades of green or yellow or less frequently white. A yellow pigment may be secreted into the agar, especially on PDA. Some species produce a characteristic sweet or 'coconut' odor.

Conidiophores are highly branched and thus difficult to define or measure, loosely or compactly tufted, often formed in distinct concentric rings or borne along the scant aerial hyphae. Main branches of the conidiophores produce lateral side branches that may be paired or not, the longest branches distant from the tip and often phialides arising directly from the main axis near the tip. The branches may rebranch, with the secondary branches often paired and longest secondary branches being closest to the main axis. All primary and secondary branches arise at or near 90° with respect to the main axis. The typical Trichoderma conidiophore with paired branches assumes a pyramidal aspect. Typically the conidiophore terminates in one or a few phialides. In some species (e.g., T. polysporum) the main branches are terminated by long, simple or branched, hooked, straight or sinuous, septate, thin-walled, sterile or terminally fertile elongations. The main axis may be the same width as the base of the phialide or it may be much wider.

Phialides are typically enlarged in the middle but may be cylindrical or nearly subglobose. Phialides may be held in whorls, at an angle of 90° with respect to other members of the whorl, or they may be variously penicillate (gliocladium-like). Phialides may be densely clustered on a wide main axis (e.g., T. polysporum, T. hamatum), or they may be solitary (e.g., T. longibrachiatum).

Conidia typically appear dry, but in some species, they may be held in drops of clear green or yellow liquid (e.g., T. virens, T. flavofuscum). Conidia of most species are ellipsoidal, 3–5 x 2–4 μm (L/W = > 1.3); globose conidia (L/W < 1.3) are rare. Conidia are typically smooth but tuberculate to finely warted conidia are known in a few species. Conidia appear colorless to green, smooth to rough, and are in moist conidial masses, variable in shape and size, small, 2.8– 4.8 μm for common species. Conidiophores branch repeatedly, bearing clusters of phialides terminally in most cases.

Synanamorphs are formed by some species that also have typical Trichoderma pustules. Synanamorphs are recognized by their solitary conidiophores that are verticillately branched and that bear conidia in a drop of clear green liquid at the tip of each phialide.

Chlamydospores may be produced by all species, but not all species produce chlamydospores on CMD at 20 °C within 10 days. Chlamydospores are typically unicellular subglobose and terminate short hyphae; they may also be formed within hyphal cells. Chlamydospores of some species are multicellular (e.g., T. stromaticum).

Trichoderma genomes appear to be in the 30–40 Mb range, with approximately 12,000 genes being identifiable.

== Teleomorph ==
Teleomorphs of Trichoderma are species of the ascomycete genus Hypocrea. These are characterized by the formation of fleshy, stromata in shades of light or dark brown, yellow or orange. Typically the stroma is discoidal to pulvinate and limited in extent but stromata of some species are effused, sometimes covering extensive areas. Stromata of some species (Podostroma) are clavate or turbinate. Perithecia are completely immersed. Ascospores are bicellular but disarticulate at the septum early in development into 16 part-ascospores so that the ascus appears to contain 16 ascospores. Ascospores are hyaline or green and typically spinulose. More than 200 species of Hypocrea have been described but few have been grown in pure culture and even fewer have been described in modern terms.

== Occurrence ==
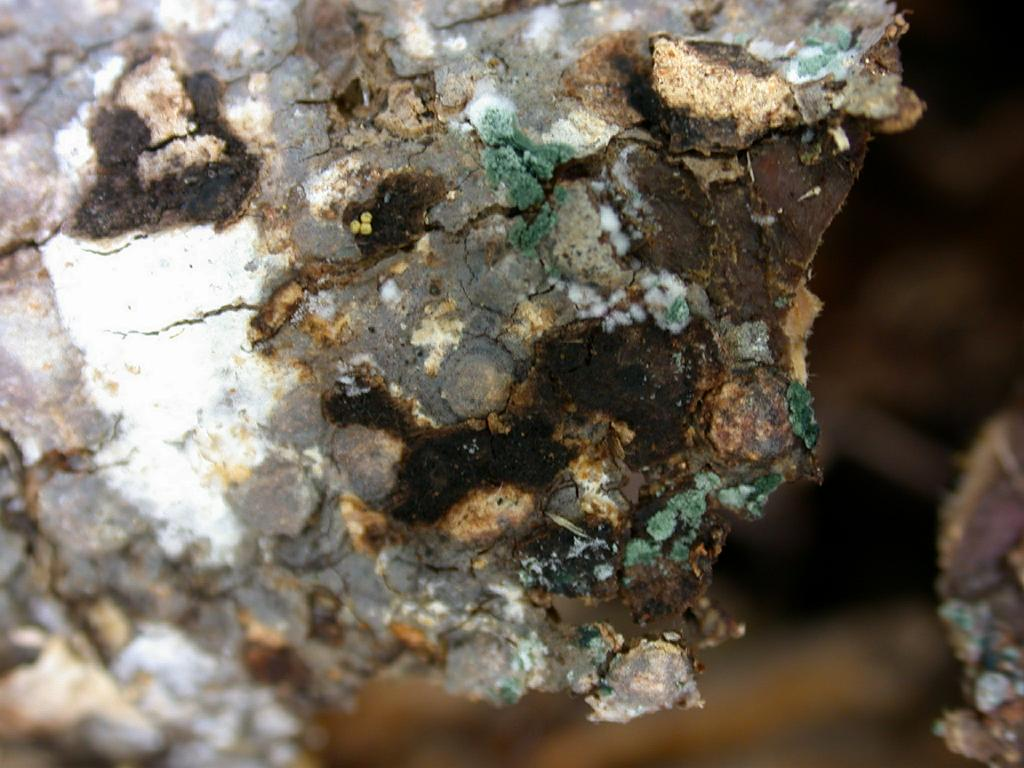
Trichoderma colony in nature

Trichoderma species are frequently isolated from forest or agricultural soils at all latitudes. Hypocrea species are most frequently found on bark or on decorticated wood but many species grow on bracket fungi (e.g. H. pulvinata), Exidia (H. sulphurea) or bird's nest fungi (H. latizonata) or agarics (H. avellanea).

== Biocontrol agent ==
Several strains of Trichoderma have been developed as biocontrol agents against fungal diseases of plants. The various mechanisms include antibiosis, parasitism, inducing host-plant resistance , and competition. Most biocontrol agents are from the species T. asperellum, T. harzianum, T. viride, and T. hamatum. The biocontrol agent generally grows in its natural habitat on the root surface, and so affects root disease in particular, but can also be effective against foliar diseases.

== Causal agent of disease ==
Many species of Trichoderma are major pathogens of cultivated mushrooms, with infections being referred to as "green mold." Trichoderma species have been found to infect button mushrooms, shiitake, oyster mushrooms, among others. Trichoderma infections have caused major crop losses and widespread epidemics in mushroom growing regions, with estimates of damages caused by infections totaling to tens of millions of dollars. Infected substrate leads to lower yields due to competition, and also causes mushrooms to be malformed, discolored, lesioned, and of lower mass than is typical. The species T. aggressivum (formerly T. harzianum biotype 4) has been found to infect button mushrooms.

Trichoderma spp. can also be pathogenic to plants. Trichoderma viride is the causal agent of green mold rot of onion. A strain of Trichoderma viride is a known cause of dieback of Pinus nigra seedlings.

=== Toxic house mold ===
The common house mold, Trichoderma longibrachiatum, produces small toxic peptides containing amino acids not found in common proteins, like alpha-aminoisobutyric acid, called trilongins (up to 10% w/w). Their toxicity is due to absorption into human cells and production of nano-channels that obstruct vital ion channels that ferry potassium and sodium ions across the cell membrane. This affects in the cells action potential profile, as seen in cardiomyocytes, pneumocytes and neurons leading to conduction defects. Trilongins are highly resistant to heat and antimicrobials making primary prevention the only management option.

== Medical uses ==
Cyclosporine A (CsA), a calcineurin inhibitor produced by the fungi Trichoderma polysporum, Tolypocladium inflatum, and Cylindrocarpon lucidum, is an immunosuppressant prescribed in organ transplants to prevent rejection.

== Industrial use ==
Trichoderma, being a saprophyte adapted to thrive in diverse situations, produces a wide array of enzymes. By selecting strains that produce a particular kind of enzyme, and culturing these in suspension, industrial quantities of enzyme can be produced.

- Trichoderma reesei is used to produce cellulase and hemicellulase.
- Trichoderma longibrachiatum is used to produce xylanase.
- Trichoderma harzianum is used to produce chitinase.

== See also ==
- List of Trichoderma species
- Bisvertinolone

== Bibliography ==
- Rifai, M. A. 1969. A revision of the genus Trichoderma. Mycol. Pap. 116:1-56.
- Druzhinina, Irina; Kubicek, Christian P. (February 2005). "Species concepts and biodiversity in Trichoderma and Hypocrea : from aggregate species to species clusters?". Journal of Zhejiang University Science. 6B (2): 100–112. doi:10.1631/jzus.2005.B0100. PMC 1389624. PMID 15633245.
