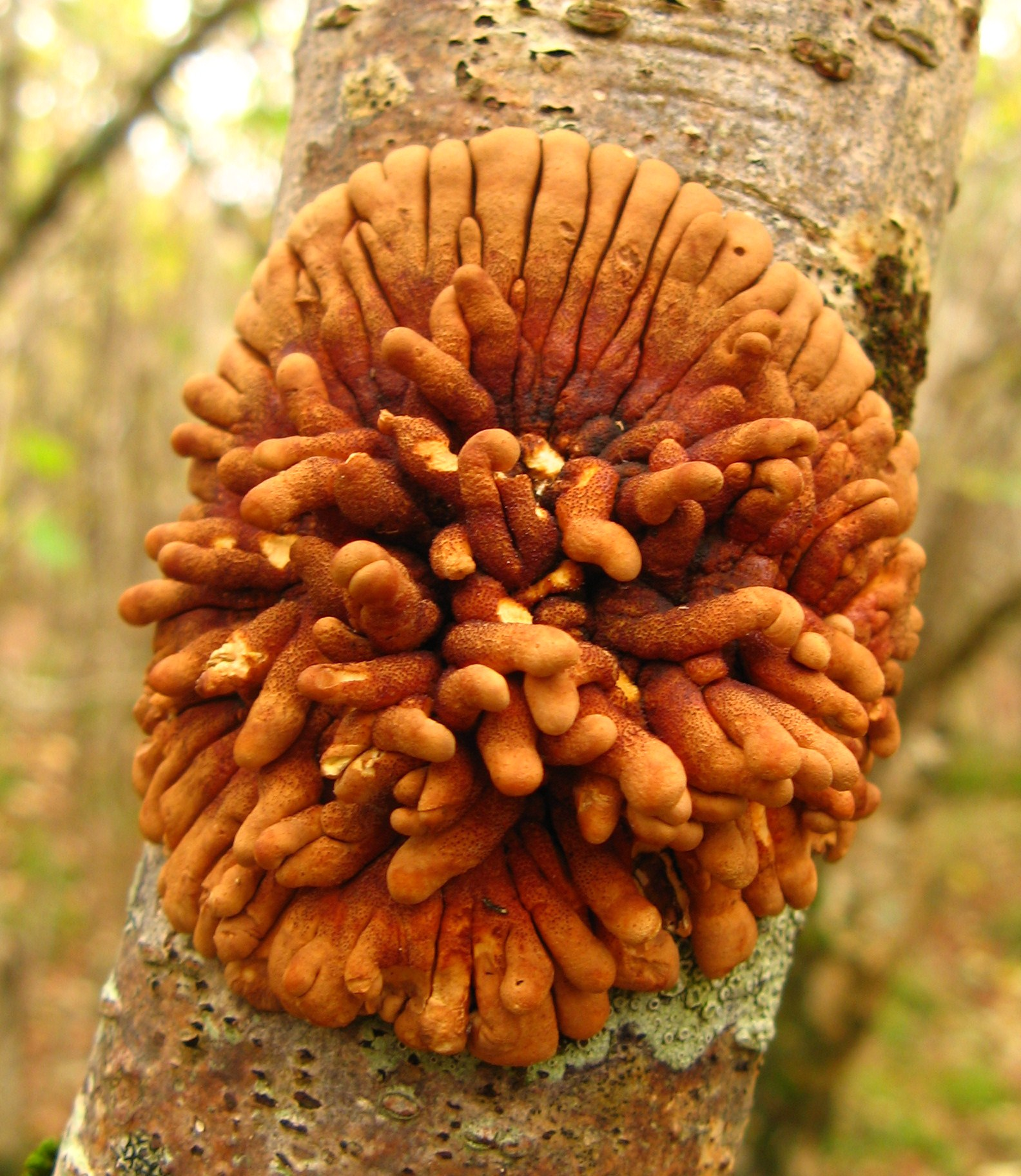
- Hypocreopsis rhododendri on a hazel tree.

Scientific classification
- Kingdom: Fungi
- Division: Ascomycota
- Class: Sordariomycetes
- Order: Hypocreales
- Family: Hypocreaceae; De Not. (1844)

Type genus
- Hypocrea Fr. (1825)

Genera
- see text

= Hypocreaceae =

Family of fungi

The Hypocreaceae are a family within the class Sordariomycetes. Species are recognisable by their brightly coloured perithecial ascomata, typically yellow, orange or red. The family was proposed by Giuseppe De Notaris in 1844. According to the Dictionary of the Fungi (10th edition, 2008), the family has 22 genera and 454 species. In 2020, it was re-analysed and determined to have only 17 genera and about 658 species.

== Genera (sp.) ==
As accepted in 2020:

- Arachnocrea Z. Moravec. (3)
- Dialhypocrea Spe (1)
- Escovopsioides H.C. Evans & J.O. Augustin (1)
- Escovopsis J.J. Muchovej & Della Lucia (14)
- Hypocreopsis P. Karst. (14)
- Hypomyces (Fr.) Tul. & C. Tul. (ca. 150)
- Illosporiopsis D. Hawksw.
- Kiflimonium Summerb., J.A. Scott, Guarro & Crous (1)
- Lichenobarya Etayo, Diederich & Lawrey (1)
- Mycogone Link (28)
- Protocrea Petch (6)
- Rogersonia Samuels & Lodge (1)
- Sepedonium Link (13)
- Sphaerostilbella (Henn.) Sacc. & D. Sacc (13)
- Sporophagomyces K. Põldmaa & Samuels (3)
- Stephanoma Wallr. (?6)
- Trichoderma Pers. (400+)
- Verticimonosporium Matsush. (3)
