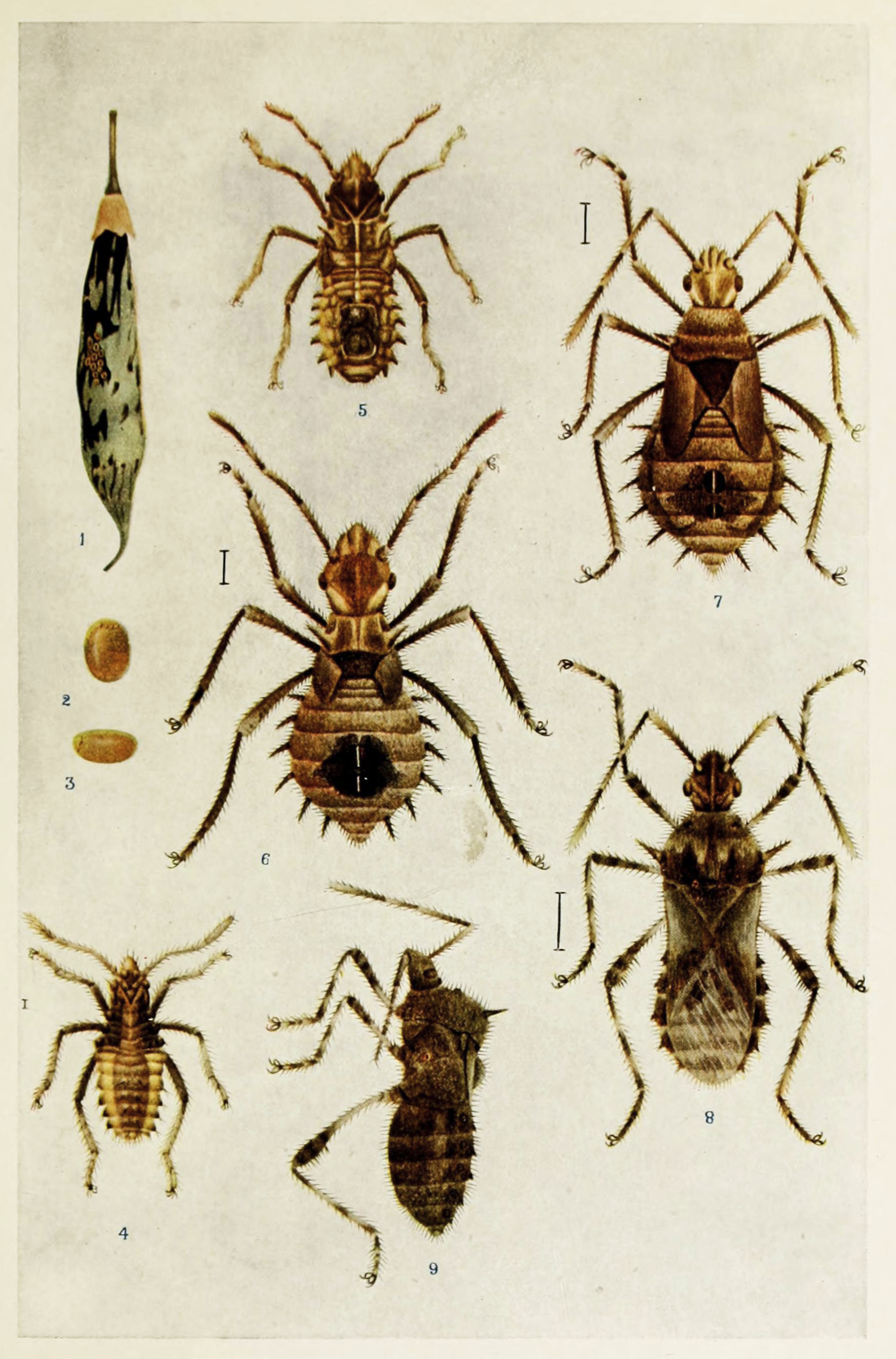
- Pigeon pea pod, eggs (2,3) nymphs (4,5,6,7) and adults (8,9)

Scientific classification
- Domain: Eukaryota
- Kingdom: Animalia
- Phylum: Arthropoda
- Class: Insecta
- Order: Hemiptera
- Suborder: Heteroptera
- Family: Coreidae
- Tribe: Clavigrallini
- Genus: Clavigralla
- Species: C. gibbosa

Binomial name
- Clavigralla gibbosa Spinola, 1837

= Clavigralla gibbosa =

Species of true bug

Clavigralla gibbosa, the tur pod bug, is a species of leaf-footed bug in the family Coreidae. It is found in India, Sri Lanka and Myanmar, where it is a pest of pigeon pea (Cajanus cajan).

== Distribution ==
Clavigralla gibbosa occurs in India, Sri Lanka and Myanmar, where the adults and nymphs feed on pigeon pea.

== Life cycle ==
As a hemipteran, this species is hemimetabolous, meaning that it does not undergo metamorphosis. Instead, the young are called nymphs. They moult several times, and each instar resembles the adult more than the previous one. Eggs are laid in clutches of five to ten on leaves and pods of the host plant, three or four hundred eggs being laid by each female over a period of five months. The eggs hatch in four to twenty days, nymphal development taking 4.3 days in May and 20 days in January. Generations show considerable overlap and up to six generations can occur between November and May. Although adult insects can live on other leguminous plants, nymphal development only takes place on pigeon pea.

== Ecology ==
Pigeon pea is an important leguminous crop in semi-arid areas of tropical and subtropical India, ranking second behind chickpeas. The plant is a perennial, has a long tap root and can thrive in drier conditions than maize and millet. The seeds of pigeon pea contain high levels of protein and the amino acids methionine, lysine, and tryptophan; they are eaten fresh or dried, the hulm is fed to livestock and the woody parts of the plant are used for firewood. The plant is attacked by a number of insect pests, including the gram pod borer (Helicoverpa armigera), the arhar plume moth (Exelastis atomosa), arhar pod fly (Melanagromyza obtusa), the legume pod borer (Maruca vitrata), the tur pod bug and the blister beetle (Mylabris spp.).

The tur pod bug is the most damaging sap-sucking pest of pigeon pea in India. The pods and seeds are the prime site for attack, young seeds being damaged; during heavy attacks the pods become shrivelled. Flowers, leaves and young shoots are additionally attacked.
