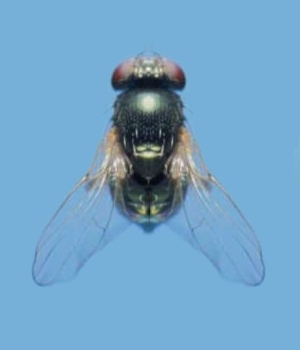
- Melanagromyza obtusa

Scientific classification
- Kingdom: Animalia
- Phylum: Arthropoda
- Clade: Pancrustacea
- Class: Insecta
- Order: Diptera
- Family: Agromyzidae
- Genus: Melanagromyza; Hendel, 1920

= Melanagromyza =

Genus of flies

Melanagromyza is a genus of flies belonging to the family Agromyzidae.

The genus has cosmopolitan distribution.

Species:

- Melanagromyza achilleana Sehgal, 1971
- Melanagromyza aenea
- Melanagromyza chaerophylli Spencer, 1969
- Melanagromyza aeneoventris
- Melanagromyza albocilia
- Melanagromyza angeliciphaga
- Melanagromyza chalcosoma
- Melanagromyza chaptaliae
- Melanagromyza cleomae
- Melanagromyza lappae
- Melanagromyza metallica
- Melanagromyza minimoides
- Melanagromyza nigrissima
- Melanagromyza obtusa
- Melanagromyza pubescens
- Melanagromyza ruelliae
- Melanagromyza sojae
- Melanagromyza verbesinae
- Melanagromyza virens
- Melanagromyza virginiensis
- Melanagromyza uricella Spencer, 1981
