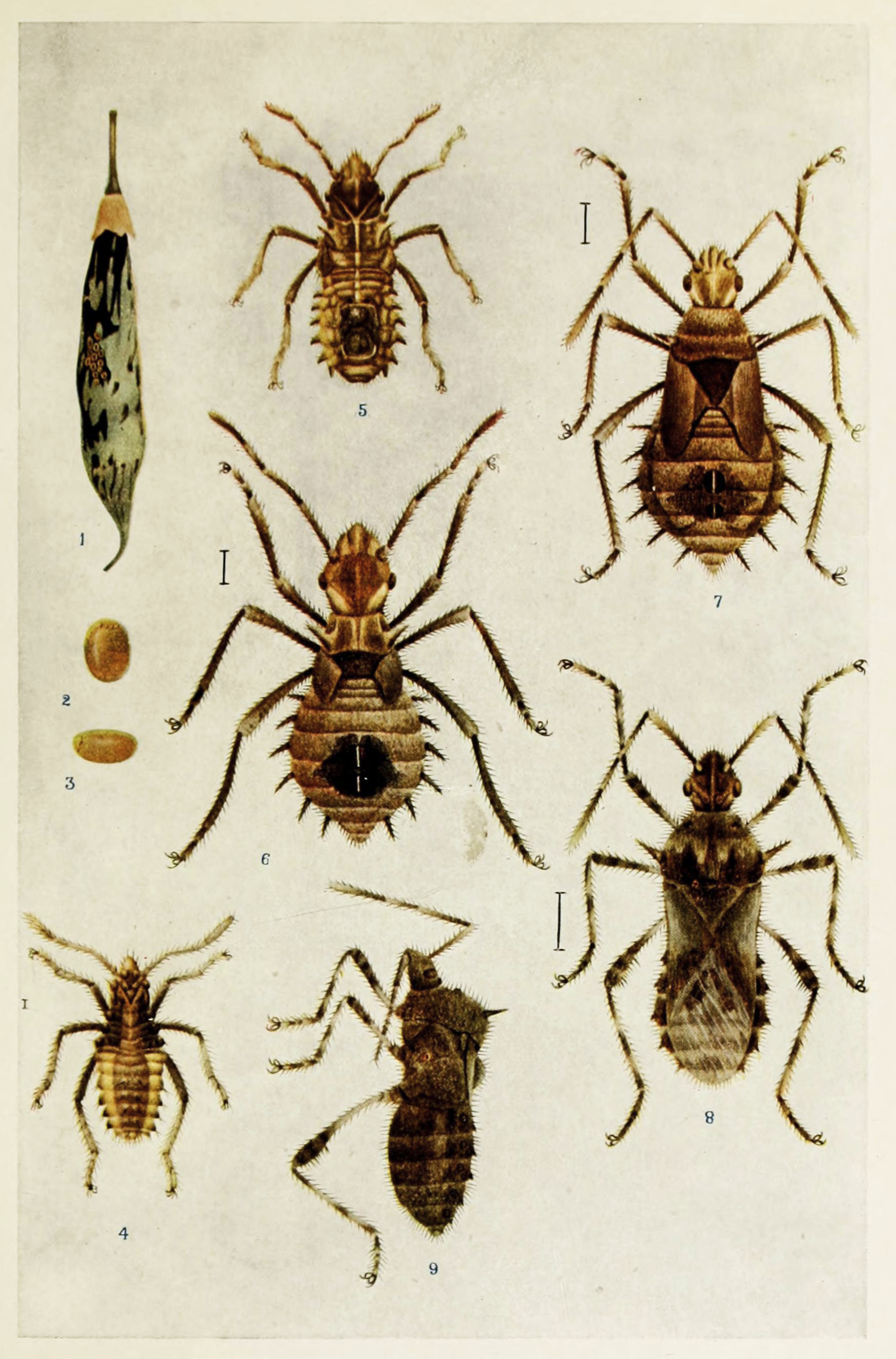
- Drawings of Clavigralla gibbosa

Scientific classification
- Domain: Eukaryota
- Kingdom: Animalia
- Phylum: Arthropoda
- Class: Insecta
- Order: Hemiptera
- Suborder: Heteroptera
- Family: Coreidae
- Tribe: Clavigrallini
- Genus: Clavigralla; Spinola, 1837

Type species
- Clavigralla gibbosa Spinola, 1837

= Clavigralla =

Genus of insects

Clavigralla is a genus of true bugs belonging to the family Coreidae.

The species of this genus are found in Africa, with one from Asia.

== Species ==
Species:

- Clavigralla aculeata Dolling, 1979
- Clavigralla alpica (Bergroth, 1927)
- Clavigralla andersoni Dolling, 1979
- Clavigralla angolensis Dolling, 1979
- Clavigralla ankatsoensis Dolling, 1979
- Clavigralla annectans Dolling, 1979
- Clavigralla annulipes Signoret, 1860
- Clavigralla asterix Dolling, 1979
- Clavigralla biston Dolling, 1979
- Clavigralla bovilla Dolling, 1979
- Clavigralla breviceps Dolling, 1979
- Clavigralla curvipes (Stål, 1873)
- Clavigralla egregia Dolling, 1979
- Clavigralla elongata Signoret, 1861
- Clavigralla gibbosa Spinola, 1837
- Clavigralla griseola (Linnavuori, 1978)
- Clavigralla horrida (Germar, 1838)
- Clavigralla hystricodes Stål, 1866
- Clavigralla hystrix Dallas, 1852
- Clavigralla insignis (Distant, 1908)
- Clavigralla leontjevi (Bergoth, 1908)
- Clavigralla leroyi (Schouteden, 1938)
- Clavigralla longispina Dolling, 1979
- Clavigralla madagascariensis Dolling, 1979
- Clavigralla marmorata Dolling, 1979
- Clavigralla minor (Schouteden, 1938)
- Clavigralla mira Dolling, 1979
- Clavigralla montana Dolling, 1979
- Clavigralla natalensis Stål, 1855
- Clavigralla neavei Dolling, 1979
- Clavigralla orientalis Dolling, 1978
- Clavigralla oxonis Dolling, 1979
- Clavigralla pabo Dolling, 1979
- Clavigralla pusilla Dolling, 1979
- Clavigralla ruandana (Schouteden, 1957)
- Clavigralla schnelli (Villiers, 1950)
- Clavigralla scutellaris (Westwood, 1842)
- Clavigralla shadabi Dolling, 1979
- Clavigralla simillima Bergroth, 1913
- Clavigralla spiniscutis (Bergroth, 1913)
- Clavigralla strabo Stål, 1873
- Clavigralla tomentosicollis Stål, 1855
- Clavigralla tuberculicollis (Reuter, 1887)
- Clavigralla uelensis (Schouteden, 1938)
- Clavigralla wittei (Schouteden, 1938)
- Clavigralla zambiae Dolling, 1979
