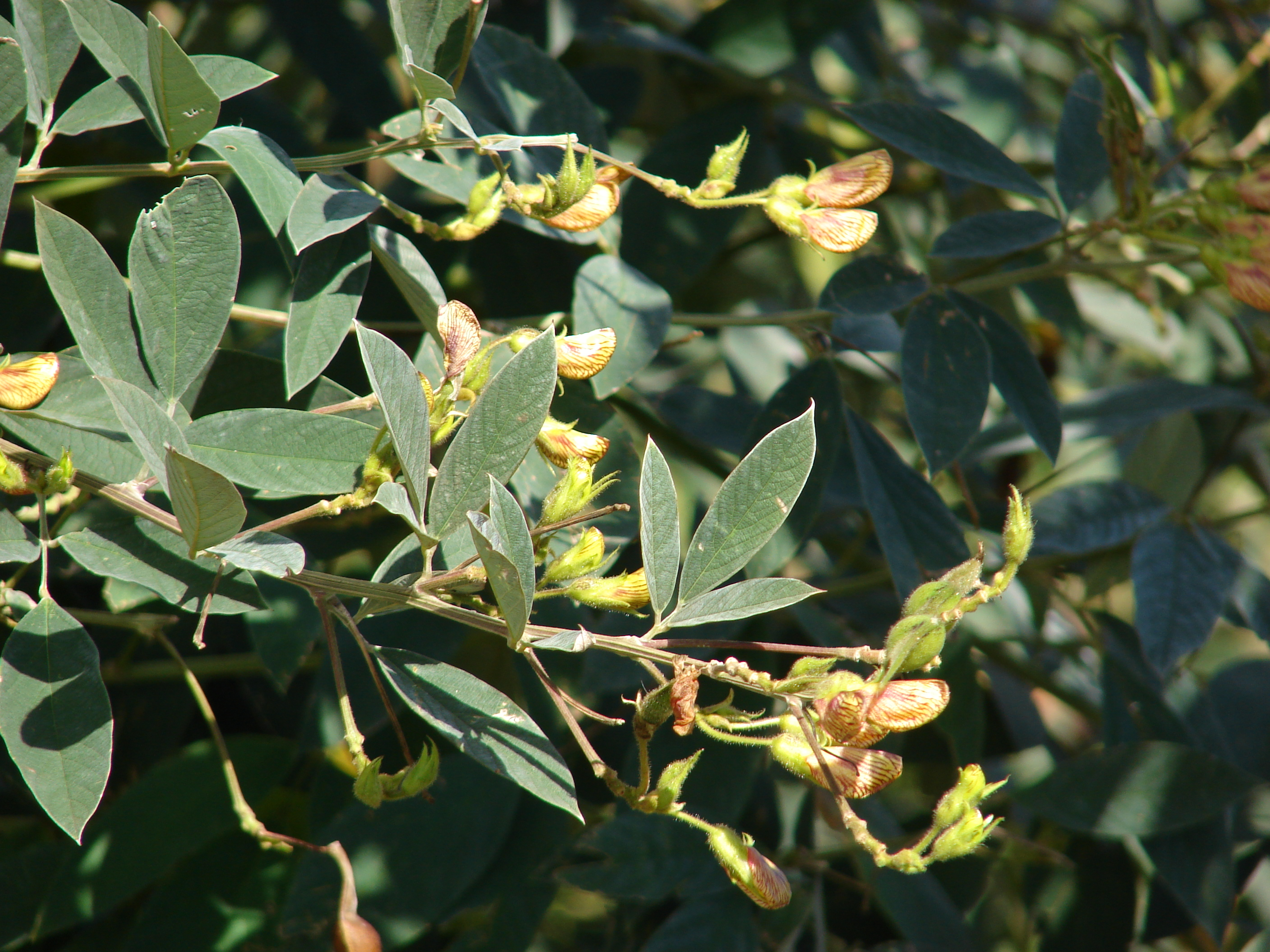
- pigeon pea (C. cajan)

Scientific classification
- Kingdom: Plantae
- Clade: Tracheophytes
- Clade: Angiosperms
- Clade: Eudicots
- Clade: Rosids
- Order: Fabales
- Family: Fabaceae
- Subfamily: Faboideae
- Tribe: Phaseoleae
- Subtribe: Cajaninae
- Genus: Cajanus; Adans. (1763), nom. cons.

Species
- 34; see text

Synonyms
- Atylosia Wight & Arn. (1834); Cajan Adans. (1763), orth. var.; Cajanum Raf. (1838); Cantharospermum Wight & Arn. (1834); Endomallus Gagnep. (1915)

= Cajanus =

Genus of legumes

The genus Cajanus is a member of the plant family Fabaceae. There are 37 species, mainly distributed across Africa, Asia and Australasia.

Species include the pigeon pea (C. cajan), which is a significant food crop.

The natural range of Cajanus species includes West Africa, Madagascar and the Comoros, the Indian Subcontinent, Indochina, southern China and Taiwan, Malesia, New Guinea, and northern Australia. Typical habitats include seasonally-dry tropical open forest, woodland, and grassland, often in rocky or disturbed areas. Some species, including Cajanus cajan, have been introduced to the tropical Americas, elsewhere in Africa, and to central Asia.

Cajanus species are used as food plants by the larvae of some Lepidoptera species including Endoclita malabaricus.

Species include:

- Cajanus acutifolius (F.Muell. ex Benth.) Maesen
- Cajanus albicans (Wight & Arn.) Maesen
- Cajanus aromaticus Maesen
- Cajanus cajan (L.) Huth – pigeon pea, Congo-pea
- Cajanus cajanifolius (Haines) Maesen
- Cajanus cinereus (F.Muell. ex Benth.) F.Muell.
- Cajanus confertiflorus F.Muell.
- Cajanus crassicaulis Maesen
- Cajanus crassus (Prain ex King) Maesen
- Cajanus elongatus (Benth.) Maesen
- Cajanus geminatus Pedley ex Maesen
- Cajanus goensis Dalzell
- Cajanus grandiflorus (Benth. ex Baker) Maesen
- Cajanus heynei (Wight & Arn.) Maesen
- Cajanus hirtopilosus Maesen
- Cajanus kerstingii Harms
- Cajanus lanceolatus (W.Fitzg.) Maesen
- Cajanus lanuginosus Maesen
- Cajanus latisepalus (S.T.Reynolds & Pedley) Maesen
- Cajanus lineatus (Wight & Arn.) Maesen
- Cajanus mareebensis (S.T.Reynolds & Pedley) Maesen
- Cajanus marmoratus (Banks ex Benth.) F.Muell.
- Cajanus mollis (Benth.) Maesen
- Cajanus niveus (Benth.) Maesen
- Cajanus platycarpus (Benth.) Maesen
- Cajanus pubescens (Ewart & Morrison) Maesen
- Cajanus reticulatus Aiton) F.Muell.
- Cajanus scarabaeoides (L.) Thouars
- Cajanus sericeus (Benth. ex Baker) Maesen
- Cajanus trinervius (DC.) Maesen
- Cajanus villosus (Benth. ex Baker) Maesen
- Cajanus viscidus Maesen
- Cajanus volubilis (Blanco) Blanco
