= Sopa de guandú con carne salada =

Colombian soup

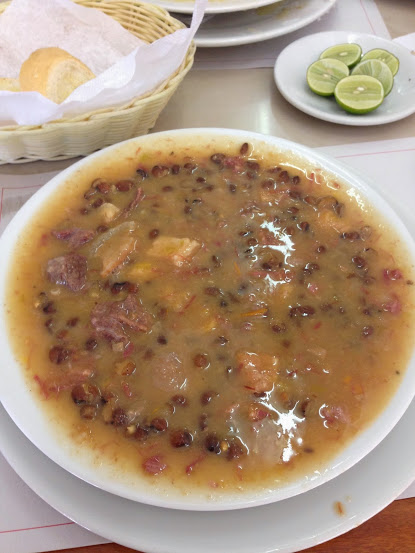
- Type: Soup
- Place of origin: Colombia
- Region or state: Atlántico
- Main ingredients: Pigeon pea, ñame, yuca, salted meat, mature plantain, chicharrón, various vegetables

Sopa de guandú con carne salada (Pigeon pea soup with salted meat) is a Colombian dish. Sopa de guandú con carne salada is a traditional dish of Colombia's Atlántico department, but many variations are prepared in the Caribbean region of Colombia, including the departments of Sucre and Córdoba.

Aside from the main ingredient of pigeon peas (preferably green), the soup contains salted meat (brisket); ñame; yuca; ripe plantain; vegetables such as onion, ají dulce, spring onion, and cilantro; as well as condiments such as cumin, salt, and pepper. Chicharrón may be added. The soup is accompanied with white or coconut rice, yuca buns, and sugarcane juice.

In Córdoba, a mote de guandú (pigeon pea hominy) is prepared with eggplant rather than yuca or salted meat. In Chinú, fresh or salted pork is added. In Sucre, a variant lacking ripe plantain and salted meat is prepared.

Sopa de guandú con carne salada is considered a traditional food of the Barranquilla Carnival because the legume is harvested there around that date.
