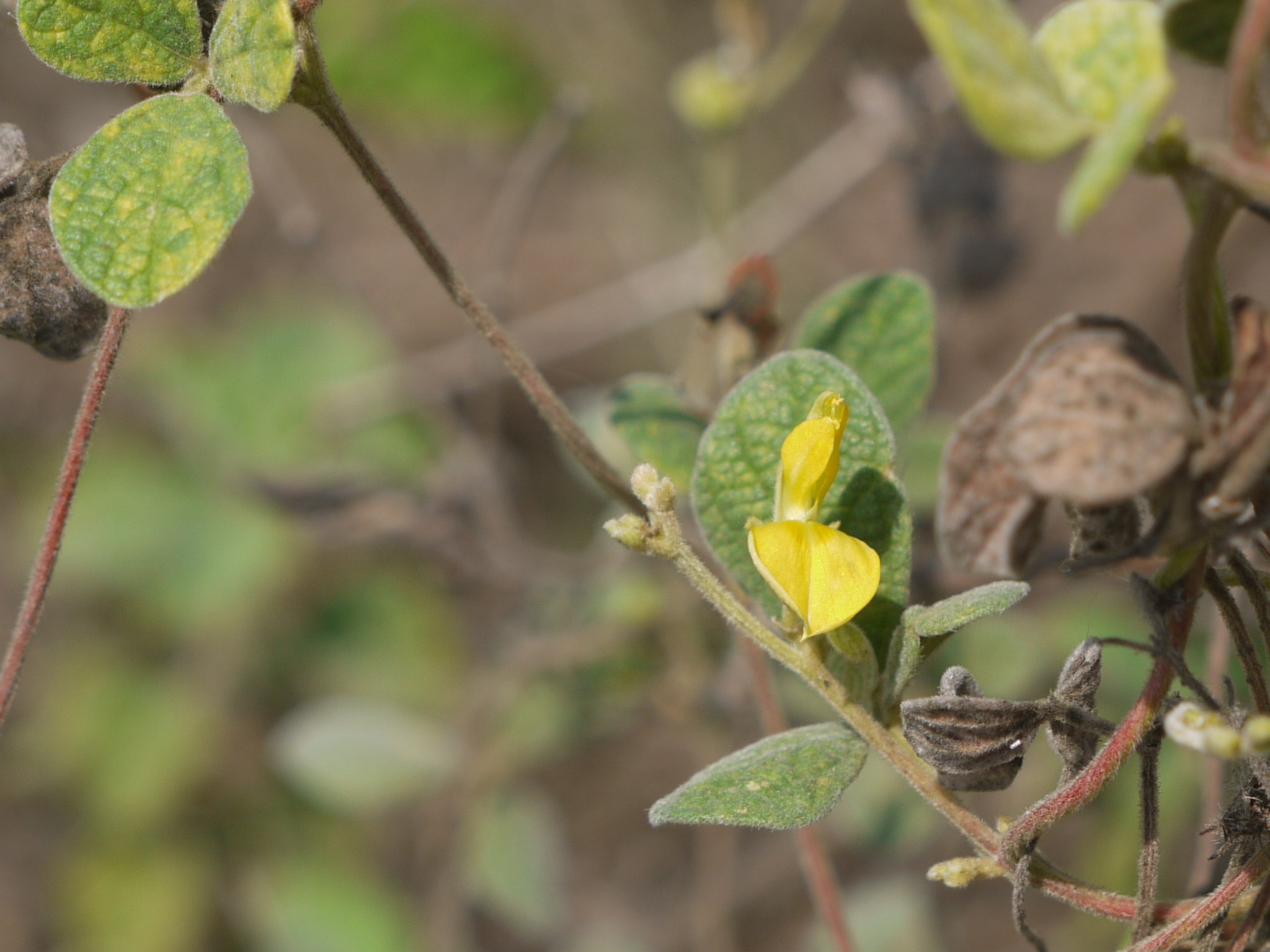

Conservation status
- Least Concern (IUCN 3.1)

Scientific classification
- Kingdom: Plantae
- Clade: Tracheophytes
- Clade: Angiosperms
- Clade: Eudicots
- Clade: Rosids
- Order: Fabales
- Family: Fabaceae
- Subfamily: Faboideae
- Genus: Cajanus
- Species: C. scarabaeoides

Binomial name
- Cajanus scarabaeoides (L.) Thouars

Synonyms
- List: Atylosia pauciflora (Wight & Arn.) Druce; Atylosia scarabaeoides (L.) Benth.; Atylosia scarabaeoides var. argyrophylla S.S.Cheng ex Y.T.Wei & S.K.Lee; Atylosia scarabaeoides var. queenslandica Domin; Atylosia scarabaeoides var. typica Domin; Cajanus scarabaeoides var. argyrophyllus (S.S.Cheng ex Y.T.Wei & S.K.Lee) Y.T.Wei & S.K.Lee; Cantharospermum nervosum Royle ex Baker; Cantharospermum pauciflorum Wight & Arn.; Cantharospermum scarabaeoides (L.) Koord.; Cantharospermum scarabaeoideum Baill.; Desmodium biflorum DC.; Dolichos minutus Roxb. ex Wight & Arn.; Dolichos scarabaeoides L.; Glycine mollis Willd.; Rhynchosia biflora DC.; Rhynchosia mollis (Willd.) DC.; Rhynchosia scarabaeoides (L.) DC.; Stizolobium scarabaeoides Spreng.

= Cajanus scarabaeoides =

Species of flowering plant

Cajanus scarabaeoides is a flowering plant in the genus Cajanus. Of the 32 different species within the genus Cajanus, only one, C. cajan (pigeonpea), is cultivated. Cajanus scarabaeoides is the closest wild relative to C. cajan, and is one of the easiest wild species to cross with pigeonpea cultivars. C. scarabaeoides is found naturally in both temperate and tropical zones around the globe. This species has higher levels of drought tolerance, is found to have greater protein content, and has higher levels of resistance to insect pests compared to cultivated types. These genetic traits can be crossed with C. cajan to improve the crop's productivity. For subsistence farmers, this can reduce economic losses and drastically improve overall crop yield.

== Description ==
Cajanus scarabaeoides is a very close wild relative species of Cajanus cajan (common name, pigeonpea). It is a dicot angiosperm of the family Fabaceae. C. scarabaeoidis may be an annual or a perennial, making it a flexible crop for subsistence farmers.

The branches of C. scarabaeoides can be straight or winding and up to 135 cm in length. C. scarabaeoides has pinnate leaves, typically arranged in a trifoliate manner with flowers that are yellow with red veins. The pods of C. scarabaeoides are oblong in shape, typically 11–34 mm in length and 6–10 mm in width. The seedpods are densely covered in a combination of short and long hairs and are typically a dark purple colour, containing anywhere from 1-7 seeds. The seeds of C. scarabaeoides range from 2.4–4 mm long, 1.8–3 mm wide, and 1–2 mm thick and are either black in colour or speckled. Compared to the pigeonpea cultivars, C. scarabaeoides has a higher pod seed percentage, 74% compared to 20%, and has more multiseed pods, on average 6.04 seeds compared to 3.0 seeds

== History and geography ==
C. scarabaeoides is the most widely distributed wild species of C. cajan and is native to many countries in both temperate and tropical zones. It is native to Madagascar in Africa. In temperate Asia it is native to China, Japan and Taiwan. In tropical Asia it is native to Bangladesh, Bhutan, India, Nepal, Pakistan, Sri Lanka, Myanmar, Thailand, Vietnam, Indonesia, Malaysia, Papua New Guinea and the Philippines. In Oceania it is native to Australia and Fiji.

In Asia, C. scarabaeoides is the most commonly disbursed wild species of Cajanus and can be found in abundance Taiwan and in the Chinese provinces of Yunnan, Guizhou, Guangxim Guangdong, Hainan and Fuijan. In China there are several names for this species. In Mandarin Chinese it is called “Man Cao Chong Duo”. In Guangdong dialect it is called “Shui Kom Ts’o”. In Yunnan dialect it is called “Jia Yan Pi Guo”.

== Growing conditions ==
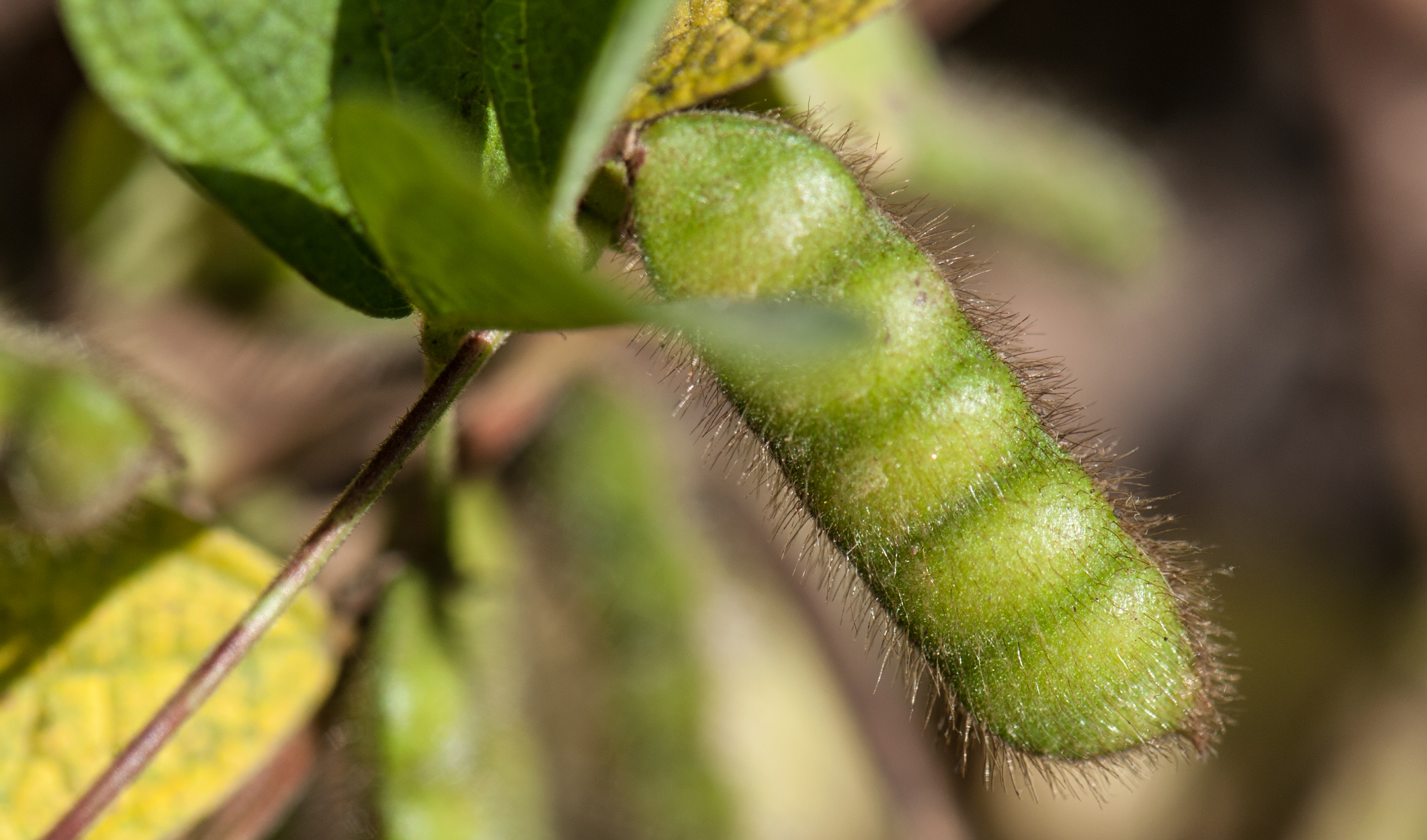
'Cajanus scarabaeoides' is one of the closest wild relatives to the cultivated pigeonpea and has high drought tolerance and high protein content. Being screened at the campus of the International Crops Research Institute for the Semi-Arid Tropics in Patancheru, India.

C. scarabaeoides occurs naturally in the wild, and can be found in open grassland and dry vegetation areas and in deciduous forests. It is often found along the ridges of cultivated fields, along roads or footpaths, or on hill slopes. It is typically found where there is a decent amount of sunlight, and populations tend to dwindle in dark bush areas or dense forests. This crop is known as a “creeper-climber” that supports itself on surrounding grass and small shrubs. In the Tiandong county in the Guangxi province of China, it can be found growing in wastelands at elevations of 180 m. In the Yi Oun Yang mountains, it can be found growing wildly in the dry hills and beside rivers. The vast areas in which this crop has the ability to grow provides advantages for farmers in both rural and peri-urban areas, as it can be supported by a variety of environments.

While pigeonpea is already a particularly good crop in terms of resistance to drought, C. scarabaeoides has even greater drought tolerance properties and is therefore capable of thriving with very little annual rainfall.

In many accessions studied of C. scarabaeoides, many have been found to flower early compared to pigeonpea cultivars. One ICRISAT study reports flowering in some C. scarabaeoides accessions as early as 34 days compared to 60 days. Another ICRISAT study reports C. scarabaeoides accessions flowering within 70 days compared to 126 days. If C. scarabaeoides can be crossed with pigeonpea cultivars for this desirable trait, farmers can reduce harvest time and increase overall yield. With the world's changing climate, this trait is useful to improve the long-term sustainability of the pigeonpea crop.

== Additional uses ==
In China, C. scarabaeoides is sometimes used as fodder, and has shown to be effective in reducing diarrhea in cattle. In addition, the leaves of the plant species have been used to improve indigestion in traditional medicines as well as limit the excessive production of urine.

== Major pests ==
Within the Cajanus species, the pod borer, Helicoverpa armigera, is a major constraint that limits crop productivity. This insectivorous pest attacks the pods during the developmental stage, which reduces the total grain yield of the plant. This pest is very difficult to manage, largely due to its extensive host range and migratory capabilities. Additionally, H. armigera has become more resistant to certain insecticides in recent years, increasing the degree of difficulty to which management of this pest is possible.

Wild relatives of pigeonpea, specifically C. scarabaeoides, have high levels of resistance to this destructive insect pest. The larval survival rate of H. armigera on C. scarabaeoides is only 21%, where it is 78% on pigeonpea. There is significant evidence showing that these species have different mechanisms than that of the cultivated types, all of which limit the ability for H. armigera to thrive on the plant. For scientists, breeders, and subsistence farmers, identifying these mechanisms can improve host plant resistance in cultivated types and reduce economic losses.

=== Structural mechanisms ===
Research has been done on the types of plant trichomes that different Cajanus species possess. Typically, there are 5 types of trichomes found, where types A, B and E are glandular and types C and D are non glandular. C. scarabaeoides was found to have a greater proportion of type C, short non-glandular, and type B, short glandular, trichomes. It lacks the type A, long glandular, trichomes that cultivated pigeonpea possess. The high density of short, nonglandular and glandular trichomes on C. scarabaeoides act as a barrier against the young larvae of H. armigera. This barrier prevents larvae from feeding on the pods, causing mortality due to starvation before they are able to reach maturity. H. armigera lays 80% of its eggs on the pod surface of Cajanus species, so possessing type C and B trichomes is extremely beneficial in contributing to larval mortality.

=== Chemical mechanisms ===
Other research has been done on the chemical components extracted from the pod surface of C. scarabaeoides and compared with that of cultivated pigeonpea. The β-carophyllene and guaiene that is emitted from cultivated pigeonpea, which attracts H. armigera, was found to be absent in C. scarabaeoides. Acetone that was extracted from the pod surface of pigeonpea was found to stimulate larval feeding, where in C. scarabaeoides the extracts did not possess this characteristic. The water extracted from the pods of both pigeonpea and C. scarabaeoides showed greater antifeedant activity in that of C. scarabaeoides. For scientists and breeders, being able to identify feeding stimulants associated with host plants and related insect pests allows for the selection of less susceptible genotypes during hybridization

=== Economic implications ===
H. armigera is the most damaging insect pest to pigeonpea cultivars, causing annual yield losses of more than $300 million globally. A study in India in 1992-93 and 1997-98 showed an average yield loss from H. armigera as high as 90-100%. For what is typically a low value and easy to manage crop, identifying resistant cultivars and their genotypic traits can bring significant economic benefits for poor, subsistence farmers [10].

== Nutritional information ==
Similar to the cultivated types, C. scarabaeoides is rich in protein and essential amino acids. The seed protein content can range from 17.8-27%, typically being in the upper portion of the range, where cultivated types typically only have around 20% protein content. C. scarabaeoides leaves are also rich in protein, around 13%. This allows farmers to make greater use of the whole crop, as both the seeds and leaves can be eaten for their protein. Additionally, C. scarabaeoides is rich in the amino acids methionine and cysteine, around 3% of protein compared to only 2% in cultivated pigeonpea. These sulfur-based amino acids play an essential role in building the protein structures within this crop.

The sugar content in the pods of C. scarabaeoides was found to be much lower than that of cultivated species. Furthermore, the pods of C. scarabaeoides were also shown to have higher levels of condensed tannins. Studies suggest that these two mechanisms could be possible factors that limit the larval feeding and the growing ability of H.armigera, respectively. These beneficial traits can be used by breeders to cross into cultivated types to improve insect pest resilience on pigeonpea.

== Genetic stocks ==
ICRISAT currently maintains 213 accessions of 19 Cajanus species that represent a total of 9 countries. C. scarabaeoides comprises one of the largest collections at the gene bank, with a total of 102 accessions. By selecting for specific genetic traits in the wild species and incorporating these genes into the cultivated relatives, improved characteristics such as pest resistance and drought tolerance can improve the overall productivity and production of the crop. Improving the diversity of traits in Cajanus species can be favourable to farmers who face challenges of drought and have crops susceptible to pests.
