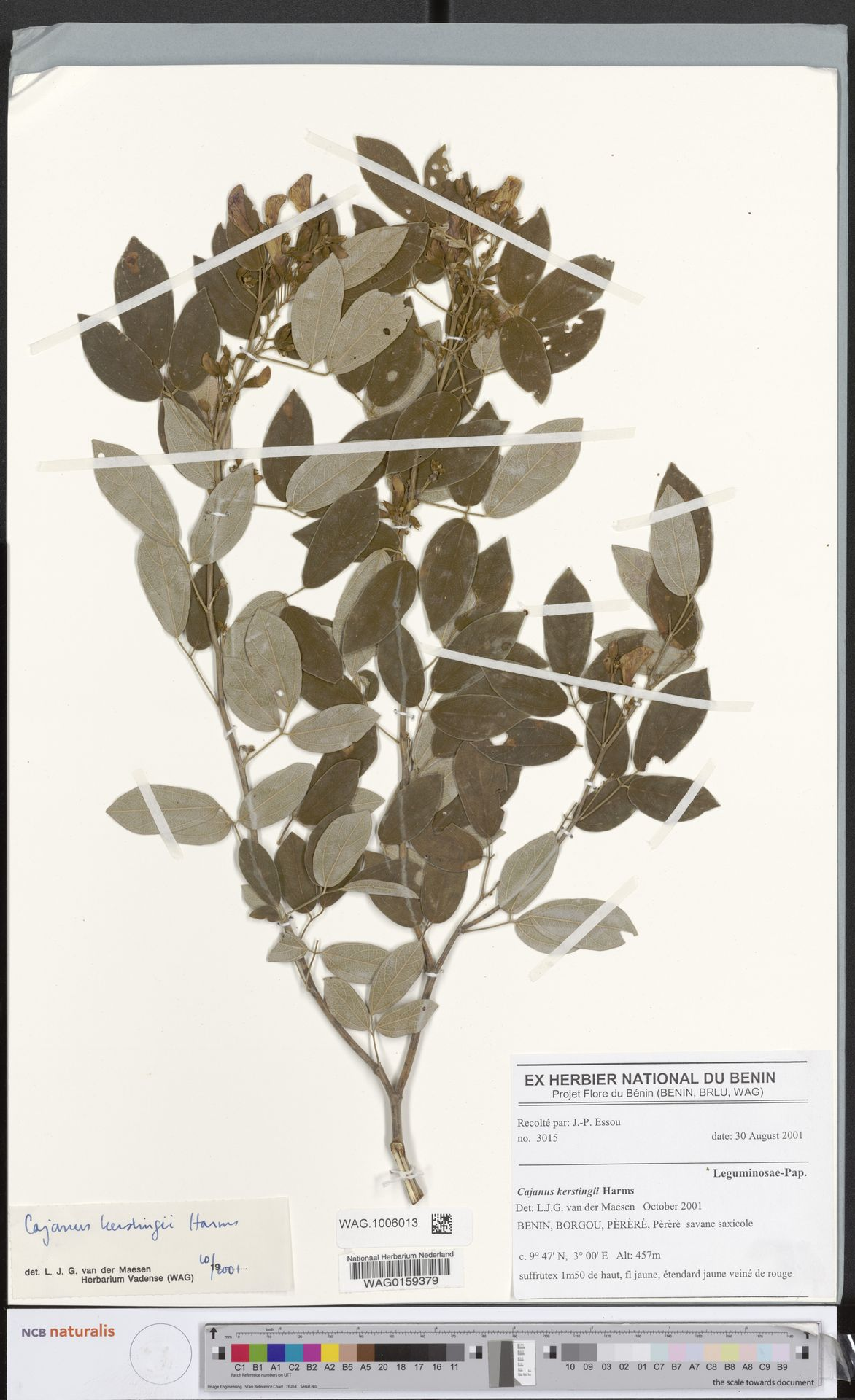

Scientific classification
- Kingdom: Plantae
- Clade: Tracheophytes
- Clade: Angiosperms
- Clade: Eudicots
- Clade: Rosids
- Order: Fabales
- Family: Fabaceae
- Subfamily: Faboideae
- Genus: Cajanus
- Species: C. kerstingii

Binomial name
- Cajanus kerstingii Harms

= Cajanus kerstingii =

Species of legume

Cajanus kerstingii is a widely ignored shrub found mostly in open savannah conditions across western Africa. It is closely related to the widely utilised Cajanus cajan, otherwise known as pigeon pea. Cajanus kerstingii can be consumed by humans as a cereal, pulse, fibre or forage. Unfortunately, very little data exists for this plant, but "one may reasonably expect it to be of value".

== Description ==
Cajanus kerstingii is an erect shrub that grows to be 90–200 centimetres (35–79 in). It is a dicot in the genus Cajanus of the subfamily Faboideae (Fabaceae). When fully harvested, C. kerstingii produces a fruit that can be consumed by humans for various nutritional purposes. In order to recognise the plant, one should seek green branches, or occasionally browny-purple. The leaves are faintly striate (marked by ridges or grooves) and a glandular punctate, meaning the glands of the leaf are sunken in, noticeable when held against the light.

== History, geography, ethnography ==
This plant grows primarily in Western African regions, namely Burkina Faso, Nigeria and Ghana. Other records show its presence in more countries, such as Benin, Mali, Senegal and Togo. C. kerstingii thrives in open savannah conditions, lateritic hills, and can survive at altitudes of 50–500 metres (160–1,640 ft). Several studies have shown that it is common on hilltops or hillsides, among grasses, large granite boulders, and occasionally shrubby trees. The species was first formally described by German botanist Hermann August Theodore Harms, in 1915 from a specimen collected by Otto Kersting in Togo in 1902.

== Growing conditions ==
Cajanus kerstingii is propagated via fruit. Cajanus kerstingii is also a perennial, non-climbing shrub, meaning it survives for more than two years. Further advantages include its resistance to flames. It grows best in soil that is fine and gravel-like.

== Weeds, pests, diseases ==
There is little data describing the pests that Cajanus kerstingii is susceptible to. Across the globe, Helicoverpa armigera is the most commonly detrimental pest and has been known to attack species within the genus Cajanus. Specifically pertaining to C. cajan, the largest impediment to growth is Fusarium udum, which causes wilting.

== Prevention of wider adaptation ==
The biggest constraint to wider use of this crop is the lack of information. Few farmers have access to useful experiences regarding Cajanus kerstingii. The main constraint to the close relative Cajanus cajan is its vulnerability to a wide variety of pests and diseases.
