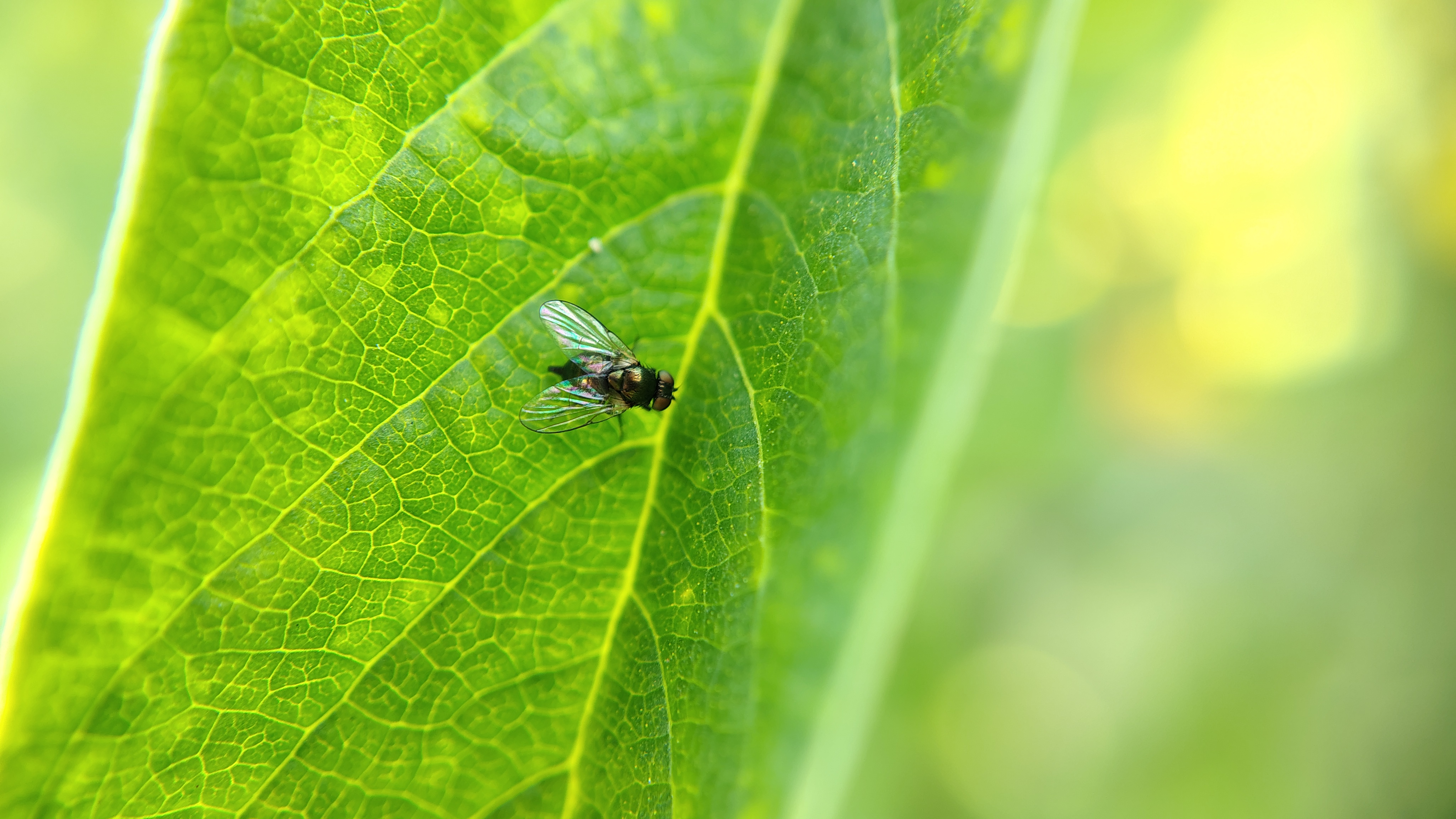
- Adult of pigeon pea pod fly

Scientific classification
- Kingdom: Animalia
- Phylum: Arthropoda
- Clade: Pancrustacea
- Class: Insecta
- Order: Diptera
- Family: Agromyzidae
- Genus: Melanagromyza
- Species: M. obtusa

Binomial name
- Melanagromyza obtusa (Malloch, 1914)

Synonyms
- Agromyza obtusa Malloch, 1914

= Melanagromyza obtusa =

Species of fly

Melanagromyza obtusa is a species of leaf miner fly in the family Agromyzidae. It directly feeds on the developing seeds of pigeon peas, responsible for 20 to 25 percent yield losses. Because they hide beneath the pod, they are a major pest of pigeon peas and are difficult to manage.
