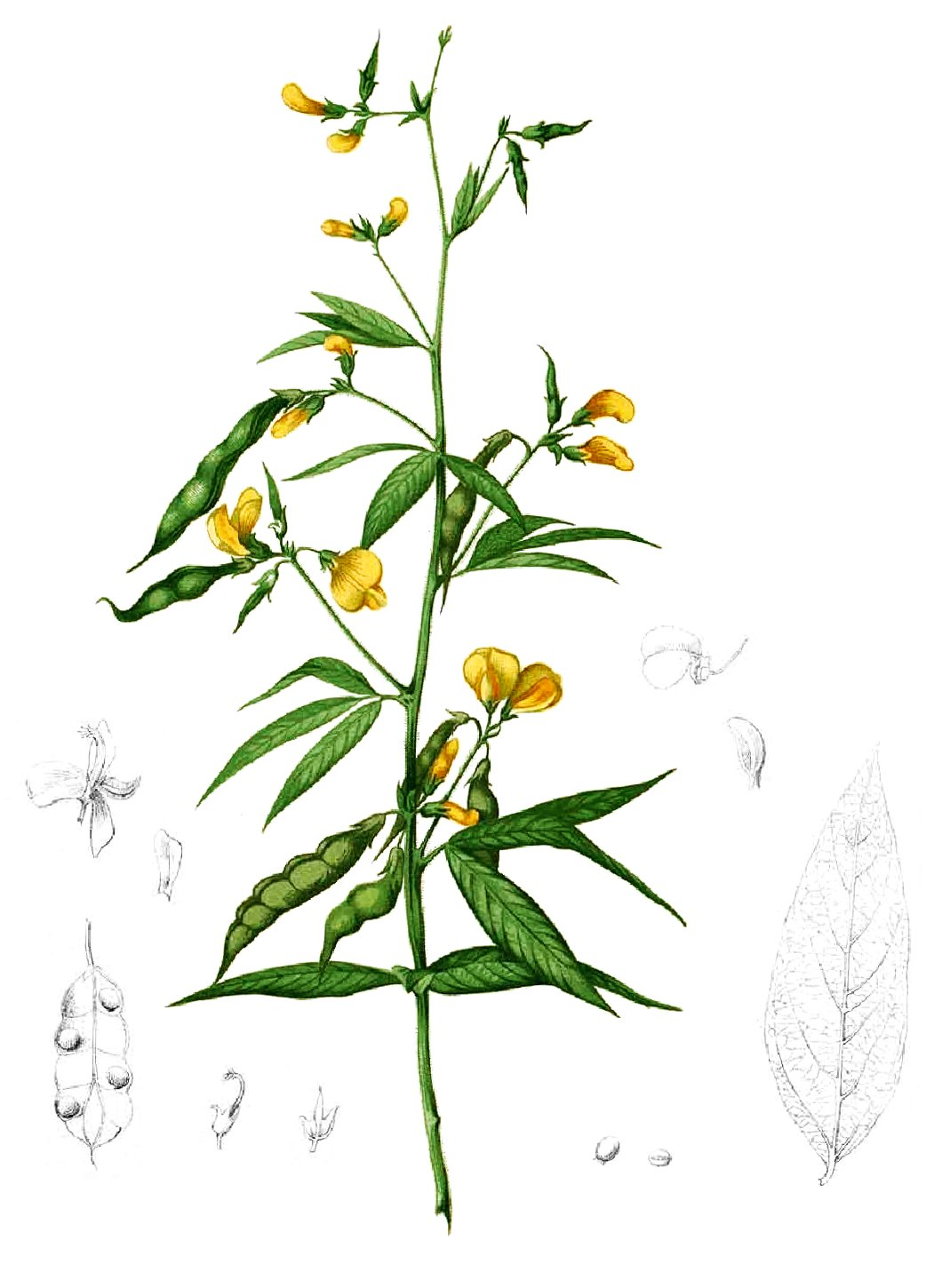
- Botanical illustration of the morphological details of a C. cajan specimen
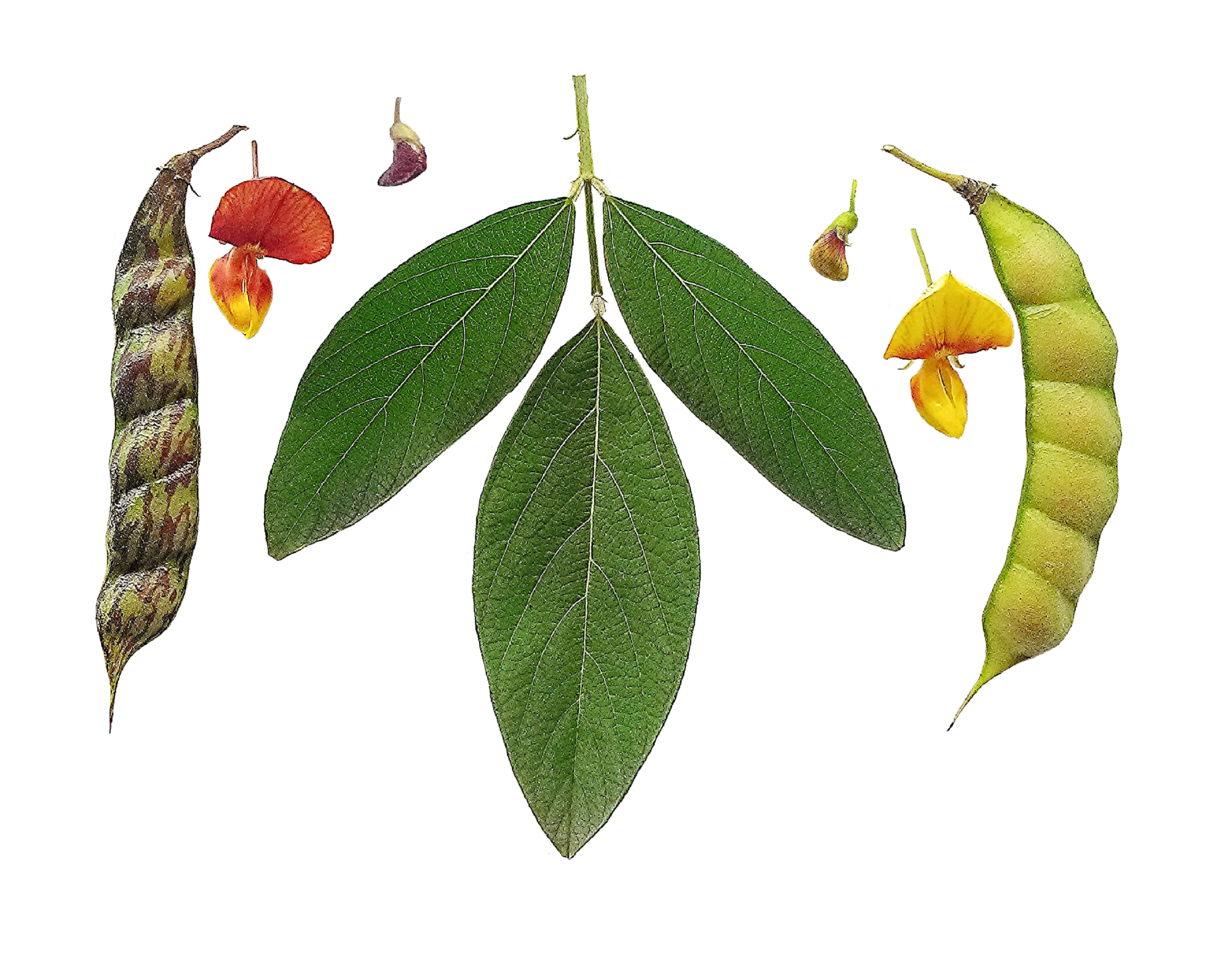
- Botanical image depicting the foliage characteristics and differing pod and flower phenotypes

Scientific classification
- Kingdom: Plantae
- Clade: Tracheophytes
- Clade: Angiosperms
- Clade: Eudicots
- Clade: Rosids
- Order: Fabales
- Family: Fabaceae
- Subfamily: Faboideae
- Genus: Cajanus
- Species: C. cajan

Binomial name
- Cajanus cajan (L.) Huth

= Pigeon pea =

Species of perennial legume

The pigeon pea (Cajanus cajan) is a perennial legume from the family Fabaceae native to the Eastern Hemisphere. The pigeon pea is widely cultivated in tropical and semitropical regions around the world, being commonly consumed in the Indian Subcontinent, Southeast Asia, Africa, Latin America and the Caribbean.

== Terminology ==
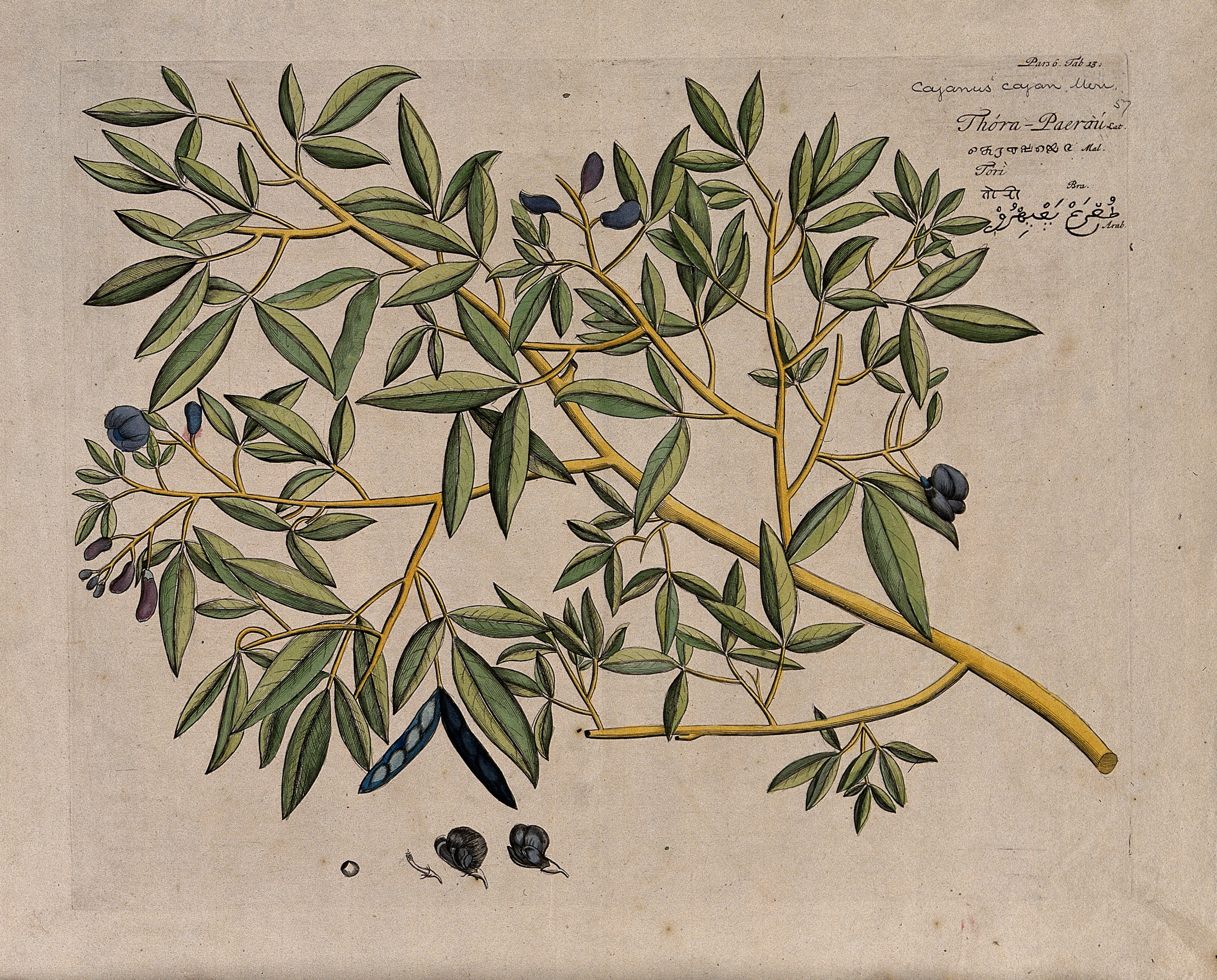
Botanical inscription of C. cajan from Hendrik van Rheede transcribed in Devanagari, Malayalam, Arabic and the Latin alphabet from "Hortus Malabaricus" (1686)

=== Scientific ===
The scientific name for the genus Cajanus and the species cajan derive from the Malay word katjang (modern spelling: kacang) meaning legume in reference to the bean of the plant.

=== Common English ===
In English they are commonly referred to as pigeon pea which originates from the historical utilization of the pulse as pigeon fodder in Barbados. The term Congo pea and Angola pea developed due to the presence of its cultivation in Africa and the association of its utilization with those of African descent. The names no-eye pea and red gram both refer to the characteristics of the seed, with no-eye pea in reference to the lack of a hilum blotch on most varieties, unlike the black-eyed pea, and red gram in reference to the red color of most Indian varieties and gram simply referring to the plant being a legume.

=== Africa ===
countries	language	name
Benin	Adja	eklui
Benin	Ede	otinin
Benin	Fon	klouékoun
Cape Verde	Cape Verdean creole	Fixon Kongu
Comoros, Mauritius	Comorian	ambrebdade
Comoros, Mauritius	Morisyen	bravate
Comoros, Mauritius	Morisyen	embrevade
Ghana	Dagbani	adowa
Ghana	Dagbani	aduwa
Kenya, Tanzania	Swahili	mbaazi
Madagascar	Malagasy	amberivatry
Malawi	Chichewa	nandolo
Nigeria	Hausa	waken-masar, 'Egyptian bean'
Nigeria	Hausa	waken-turawa, 'foreigner bean'
Nigeria	Igbo	fiofio
Nigeria	Igbo	mgbụmgbụ
Nigeria	Yoruba	òtílí
Sudan	Arabic	adaseya
Sudan	Arabic	adasia (Arabic: عدسيه)
Sudan	Arabic	adasy
Sudan	Arabic	lubiya

=== Asia ===
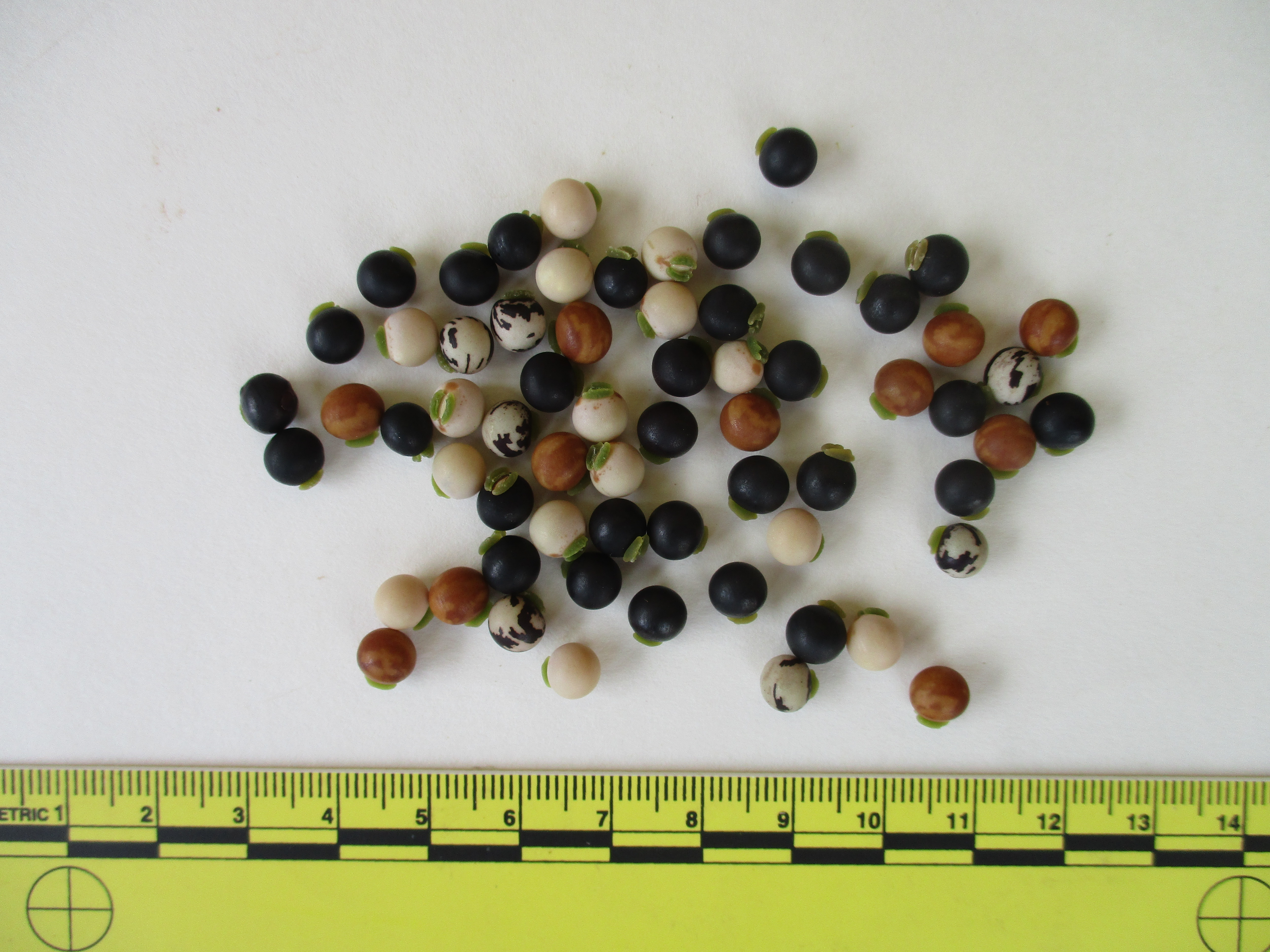
Pigeon peas from the Ereke market in Buton Island, Indonesia

In India the plant is known by names such as:

- arhar
- tur
- kandi
- arhar
- tuvarika, adhaki

In Persian, it is known as shakhul and is popular in dishes. In the Philippines they are known as Kadios in Filipino and Kadyos in Tagalog.

=== Americas ===
In Latin America, they are known as guandul or gandul in Spanish, and feijão andu or gandu in Portuguese all of which derive from Kikongo wandu or from Kimbundu oanda; both names referring to the same plant.

In the Anglophone regions of the Caribbean, like Jamaica, they are known as Gungo peas, coming from the more archaic English name for the plant congo pea, given to the plant because of its popularity and relation to Sub-Saharan Africa.

In Francophone regions of the Caribbean they are known as pois d' angole, pwa di bwa in Antillean creole and pwa kongo in Haitian creole.

In Suriname they are known as wandoe or gele pesi, the former of which is derived from the same source as its Spanish and Portuguese counterparts, the latter of which literally translates to 'yellow pea' from Dutch and Sranan Tongo.

=== Oceania ===
In Hawaii they are known as pi pokoliko, 'Puerto Rican pea' or pi nunu, 'pigeon pea' in the Hawaiian language.

== History ==
=== Origin ===
The closest relatives to the cultivated pigeon pea are Cajanus cajanifolia, Cajanus scarabaeoides, and Cajanus kerstingii, native to India and the latter West Africa respectively. Much debate exist over the geographical origin of the species, with some groups claiming origin from the Nile river and Western Africa, and the other Indian origin. The two centers of genetic diversity exist in both Africa and India, but India is considered to be its primary center of origin with West Africa being considered a second major center of origin.

=== History ===
By at least 2800 BCE in peninsular India, where its presumptive closest wild relatives Cajanus cajanifolia occurs in tropical deciduous woodlands, its cultivation has been documented. Archaeological finds of pigeon pea cultivation dating to about 14th century BCE have also been found at the Neolithic site of Sanganakallu in Bellary and its border area Tuljapur (where the cultivation of African domesticated plants like pearl millet, finger millet, and Lablab have also been uncovered), as well as in Gopalpur and other South Indian states.

From India it may have made its way to North-East Africa via Trans-Oceanic Bronze Age trade that allowed cross-cultural exchange of resources and agricultural products. The earliest evidence of pigeon peas in Africa was found in Ancient Egypt with the presence of seeds in Egyptian tombs dating back to around 2200 BCE. From eastern Africa, cultivation spread further west and south through the continent, where by means of the Trans-Atlantic slave trade, it reached the Americas around the 17th century.

Pigeon peas were introduced to Hawaii in 1824 by James Macrae with a few specimens becoming naturalized on the islands, but they wouldn't gain much popularity until later. By the early 20th century Filipinos and Puerto Ricans began to emigrate from the American Philippines and Puerto Rico to Hawaii to work in sugarcane plantations in 1906 and 1901, respectively. Pigeon peas are said to have been popularized on the island by the Puerto Rican community where by the First World War their cultivation began, to expand on the island where they are still cultivated and consumed by locals.

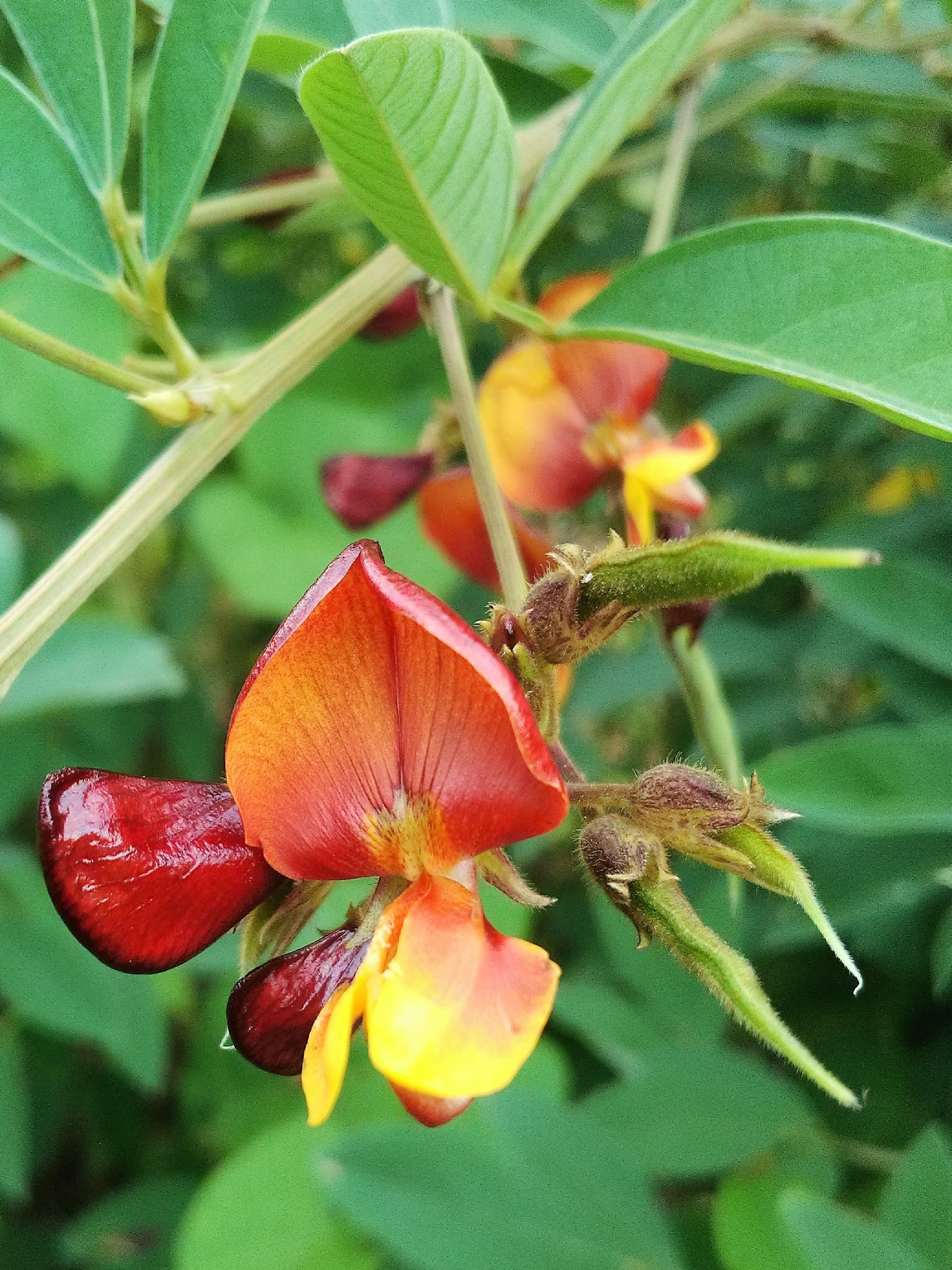
Pigeon pea flowers

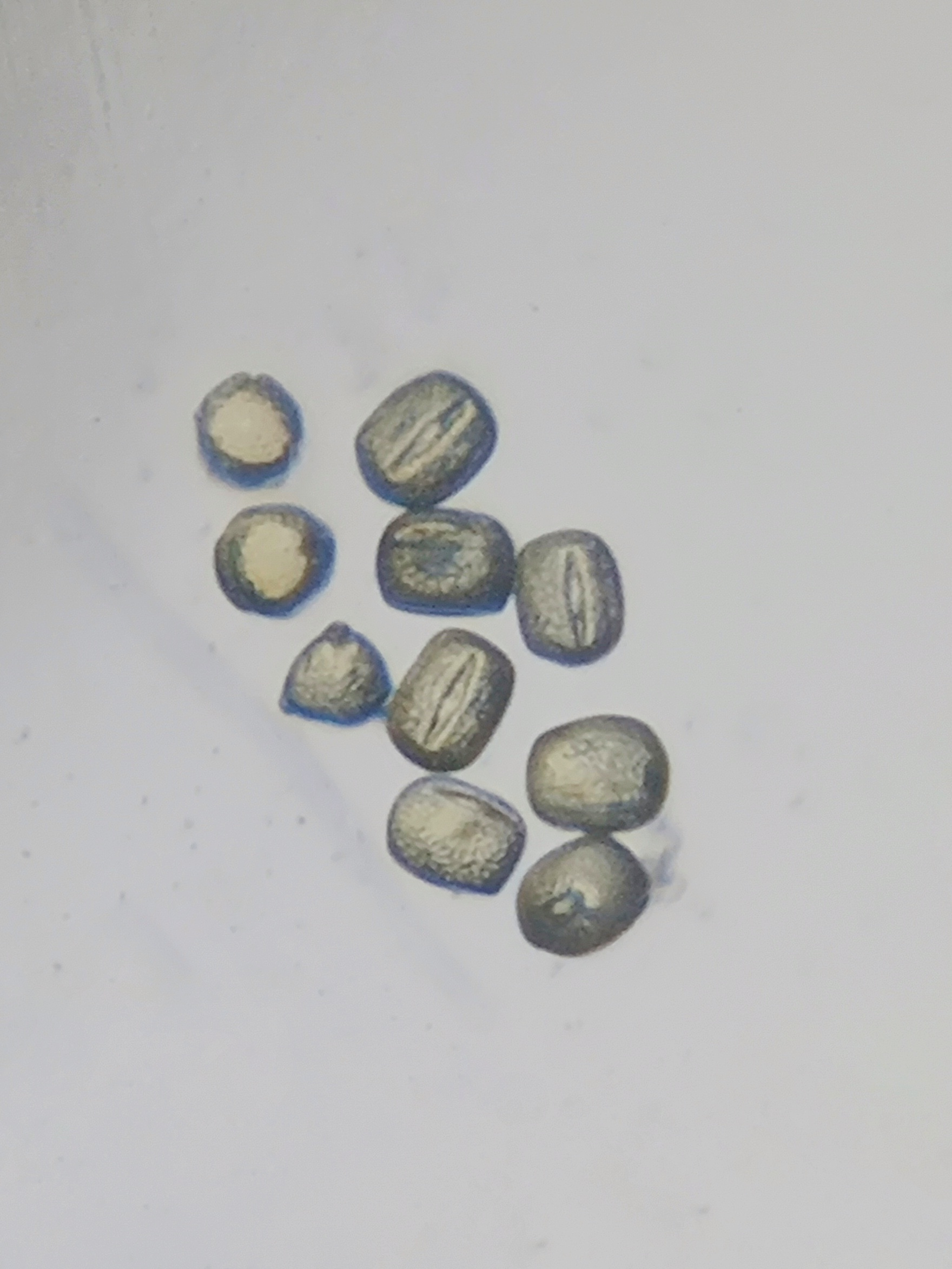
Pollen grains of pigeon pea

== Nutrition ==
Pigeon peas, immature, raw
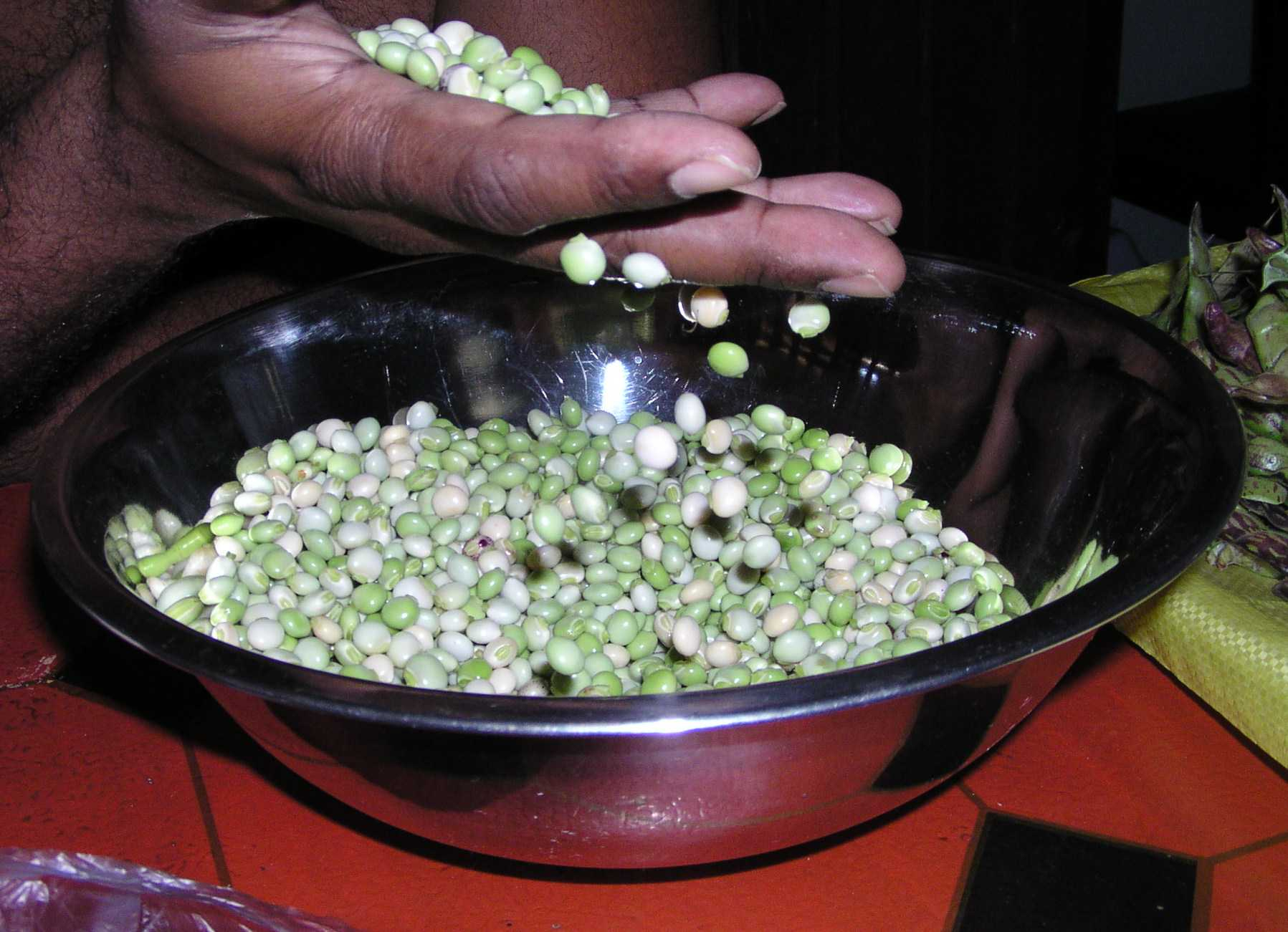
- Pigeon peas in Trinidad and Tobago

Nutritional value per 100 g (3.5 oz)
- Energy: 569 kJ (136 kcal)
- Carbohydrates: 23.88 g
- Sugars: 3 g
- Dietary fiber: 5.1 g
- Fat: 1.64 g
- Protein: 7.2 g
Vitamins and minerals
Vitamins	Quantity %DV^{†}
Thiamine (B1)	33% 0.4 mg
Riboflavin (B2)	13% 0.17 mg
Niacin (B3)	14% 2.2 mg
Pantothenic acid (B5)	14% 0.68 mg
Vitamin B6	4% 0.068 mg
Folate (B9)	43% 173 μg
Choline	8% 45.8 mg
Vitamin C	43% 39 mg
Vitamin E	3% 0.39 mg
Vitamin K	20% 24 μg
Minerals	Quantity %DV^{†}
Calcium	3% 42 mg
Iron	9% 1.6 mg
Magnesium	16% 68 mg
Manganese	25% 0.574 mg
Phosphorus	10% 127 mg
Potassium	18% 552 mg
Sodium	0% 5 mg
Zinc	9% 1.04 mg
- Link to USDA Database entry Values for Choline, Vit. E/K available
- ^{†}Percentages estimated using US recommendations for adults, except for potassium, which is estimated based on expert recommendation from the National Academies.

Pigeon peas, mature, raw
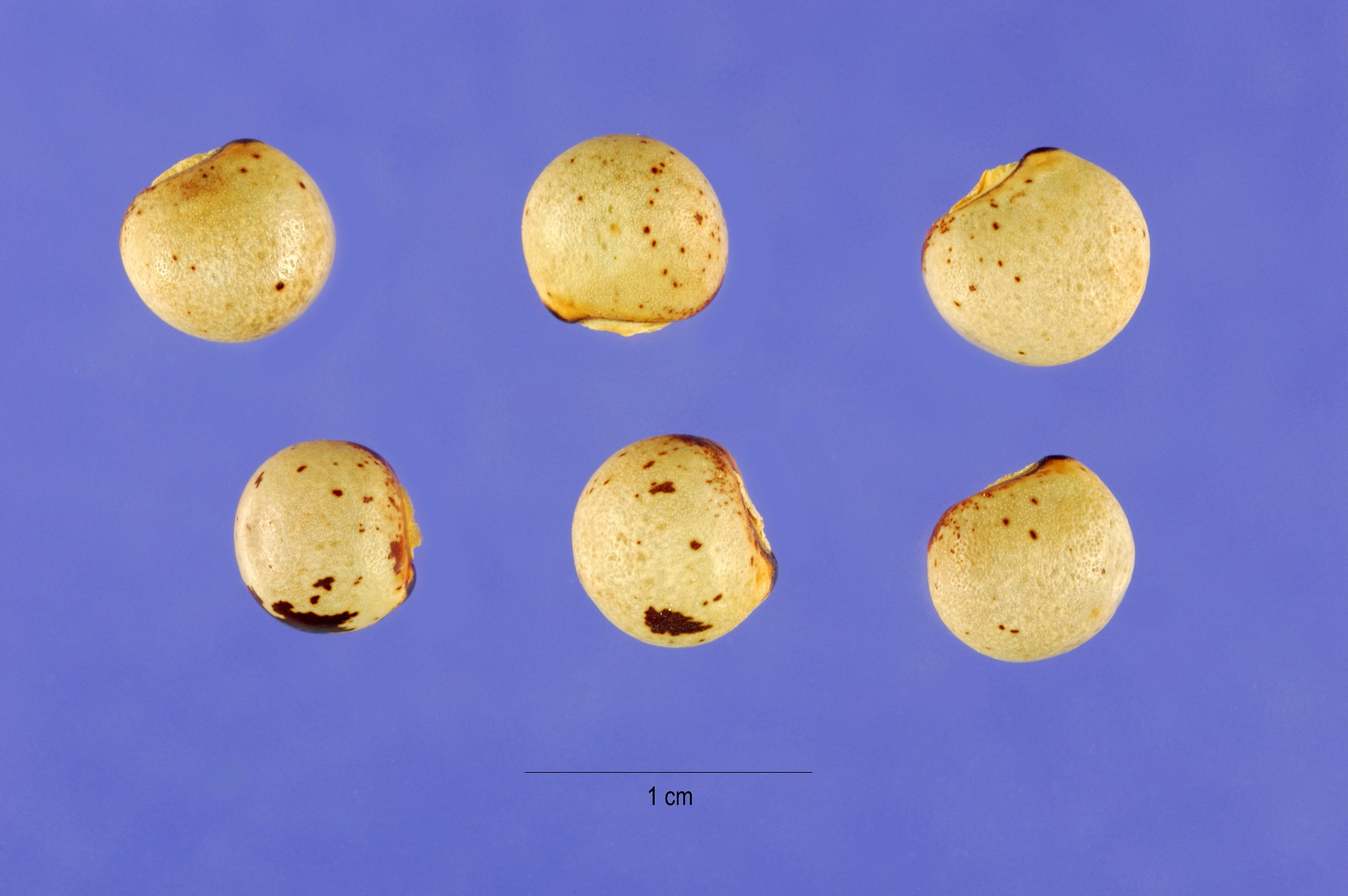
- Seeds of the pigeon pea

Nutritional value per 100 g (3.5 oz)
- Energy: 1,435 kJ (343 kcal)
- Carbohydrates: 62.78 g
- Sugars: n/a
- Dietary fiber: 15 g
- Fat: 1.49 g
- Protein: 21.7 g
Amino acids
Tryptophan	212 mg
Threonine	767 mg
Isoleucine	785 mg
Leucine	1549 mg
Lysine	1521 mg
Methionine	243 mg
Cystine	250 mg
Phenylalanine	1858 mg
Tyrosine	538 mg
Valine	937 mg
Arginine	1299 mg
Histidine	774 mg
Alanine	972 mg
Aspartic acid	2146 mg
Glutamic acid	5031 mg
Glycine	802 mg
Proline	955 mg
Serine	1028 mg
Hydroxyproline	0 mg
Vitamins and minerals
Vitamins	Quantity %DV^{†}
Thiamine (B1)	54% 0.643 mg
Riboflavin (B2)	14% 0.187 mg
Niacin (B3)	19% 2.965 mg
Pantothenic acid (B5)	25% 1.266 mg
Vitamin B6	17% 0.283 mg
Folate (B9)	114% 456 μg
Minerals	Quantity %DV^{†}
Calcium	10% 130 mg
Iron	29% 5.23 mg
Magnesium	44% 183 mg
Manganese	78% 1.791 mg
Phosphorus	29% 367 mg
Potassium	46% 1392 mg
Sodium	1% 17 mg
Zinc	25% 2.76 mg
- Link to USDA Database entry Values for Choline, Vit. E/K unavailable
- ^{†}Percentages estimated using US recommendations for adults, except for potassium, which is estimated based on expert recommendation from the National Academies.

Pigeon peas contain high levels of protein and the important amino acids methionine, lysine, and tryptophan.

The following table indicates completeness of nutritional profile of various amino acids within mature seeds of pigeon pea.

Essential Amino Acid	Available mg/g of Protein	Min. Required mg/g of Protein
Tryptophan	9.76	7
Threonine	32.34	27
Isoleucine	36.17	25
Leucine	71.3	55
Lysine	70.09	51
Methionine+Cystine	22.7	25
Phenylalanine+Tyrosine	110.4	47
Valine	43.1	32
Histidine	35.66	18

Methionine + cystine combination is the only limiting amino acid combination in pigeon pea. In contrast to the mature seeds, the immature seeds are generally lower in all nutritional values, however they contain a significant amount of vitamin C (39 mg per 100 g serving) and have a slightly higher fat content. Research has shown that the protein content of the immature seeds is of a higher quality.

Nutrient contents in %DV of common foods (raw, uncooked) per 100 g
	Protein		Fiber	Vitamins													Minerals									
		Q		A	B1	B2	B3	B5	B6	B9	B12	Ch.	C	D	E	K	Ca	Fe	Mg	P	K	Na	Zn	Cu	Mn	Se
cooking Reduction %				10	30	20	25		25	35	0	0	30				10	15	20	10	20	5	10	25		
Corn	20	55	6	1	13	4	16	4	19	19	0	0	0	0	0	1	1	11	31	34	15	1	20	10	42	0
Rice	14	71	1.3	0	12	3	11	20	5	2	0	0	0	0	0	0	1	9	6	7	2	0	8	9	49	22
Wheat	27	51	40	0	28	7	34	19	21	11	0	0	0	0	0	0	3	20	36	51	12	0	28	28	151	128
Soybean(dry)	73	132	31	0	58	51	8	8	19	94	0	24	10	0	4	59	28	87	70	70	51	0	33	83	126	25
Pigeon pea(dry)	42	91	50	1	43	11	15	13	13	114	0	0	0	0	0	0	13	29	46	37	40	1	18	53	90	12
Potato	4	112	7.3	0	5	2	5	3	15	4	0	0	33	0	0	2	1	4	6	6	12	0	2	5	8	0
Sweet potato	3	82	10	284	5	4	3	8	10	3	0	0	4	0	1	2	3	3	6	5	10	2	2	8	13	1
Spinach	6	119	7.3	188	5	11	4	1	10	49	0	4.5	47	0	10	604	10	15	20	5	16	3	4	6	45	1
Dill	7	32	7	154	4	17	8	4	9	38	0	0	142	0	0	0	21	37	14	7	21	3	6	7	63	0
Carrots	2		9.3	334	4	3	5	3	7	5	0	0	10	0	3	16	3	2	3	4	9	3	2	2	7	0
Guava	5	24	18	12	4	2	5	5	6	12	0	0	381	0	4	3	2	1	5	4	12	0	2	11	8	1
Papaya	1	7	5.6	22	2	2	2	2	1	10	0	0	103	0	4	3	2	1	2	1	7	0	0	1	1	1
Pumpkin	2	56	1.6	184	3	6	3	3	3	4	0	0	15	0	5	1	2	4	3	4	10	0	2	6	6	0
Sunflower oil	0		0	0	0	0	0	0	0	0	0	0	0	0	205	7	0	0	0	0	0	0	0	0	0	0
Egg	25	136	0	10	5	28	0	14	7	12	22	45	0	9	5	0	5	10	3	19	4	6	7	5	2	45
Milk	6	138	0	2	3	11	1	4	2	1	7	2.6	0	0	0	0	11	0	2	9	4	2	3	1	0	5
Chicken Liver	34	149	0	222	20	105	49	62	43	147	276		30	0	4	0	1	50	5	30	7	3	18	25	13	78
%DV = % daily value i.e. % of DRI (Dietary Reference Intake) Note: All nutrient values including protein and fiber are in %DV per 100 grams of the food item. Significant values are highlighted in light Gray color and bold letters. Cooking reduction = % Maximum typical reduction in nutrients due to boiling without draining for ovo-lacto-vegetables group Q = Quality of Protein in terms of completeness without adjusting for digestability.

== Cultivation ==
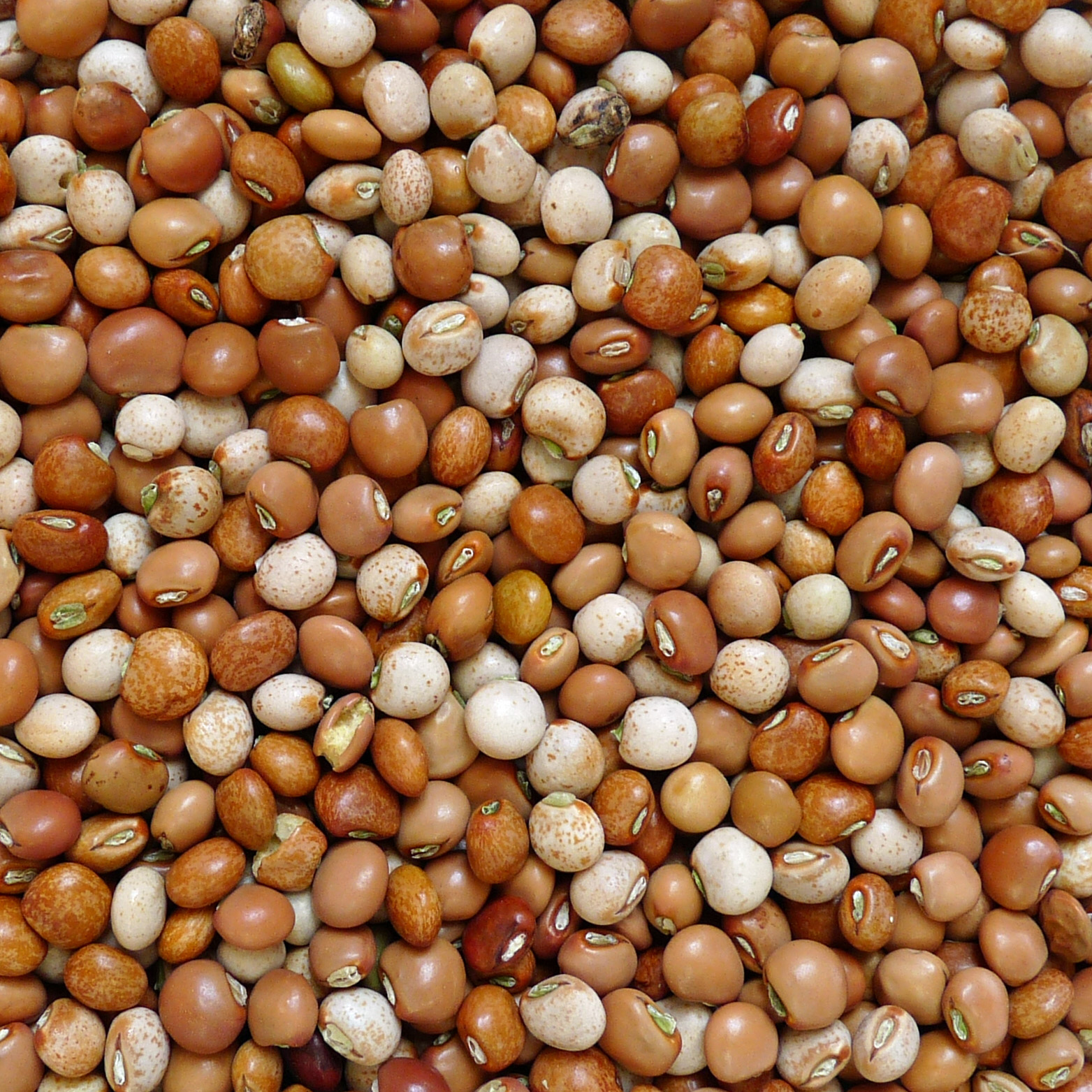
Harvested pigeon peas from Cape Verde

Pigeon peas can be of a perennial variety, in which the crop can last three to five years (although the seed yield drops considerably after the first two years), or an annual variety more suitable for seed production.

=== Production ===
World production of pigeon peas is estimated at 4.49 million tons. About 63% of this production comes from India. The total number of hectares grown to pigeon pea is estimated at 5.4 million. India accounts for 72% of the area grown to pigeon pea or 3.9 million hectares. Africa is the secondary centre of diversity and at present it contributes about 21% of global production with 1.05 million tons. Malawi, Tanzania, Kenya, Mozambique and Uganda are the major producers in Africa. Malawi's Nandolo Farmers' Association is supported by international aid via the charity Christian Aid.

The pigeon pea is an important legume crop of rainfed agriculture in the semiarid tropics. The Indian subcontinent, Africa and Central America, in that order, are the world's three main pigeon pea-producing regions. Pigeon peas are cultivated in more than 25 tropical and subtropical countries, either as a sole crop or intermixed with cereals, such as sorghum (Sorghum bicolor), pearl millet (Pennisetum glaucum), or maize (Zea mays), or with other legumes, such as peanuts (Arachis hypogea). Being a legume capable of symbiosis with Rhizobia, the bacteria associated with the pigeon pea enrich soils through symbiotic nitrogen fixation.

The crop is cultivated on marginal land by resource-poor farmers, who commonly grow traditional medium- and long-duration (5–11 months) landraces. Short-duration pigeon peas (3–4 months) suitable for multiple cropping have recently been developed. Traditionally, the use of such input as fertilizers, weeding, irrigation, and pesticides is minimal, so present yield levels are low (average = 700 kg/ha or 620 lb/acre). Greater attention is now being given to managing the crop because it is in high demand at remunerative prices.

Pigeon peas are very drought-resistant and can be grown in areas with less than 650 mm annual rainfall. With the maize crop failing three out of five years in drought-prone areas of Kenya, a consortium led by the International Crops Research Institute for the Semi-Arid Tropics (ICRISAT) aimed to promote the pigeon pea as a drought-resistant, nutritious alternative crop.

Production of dry pigeon peas

Pigeon pea yield

=== Nitrogen fixation ===
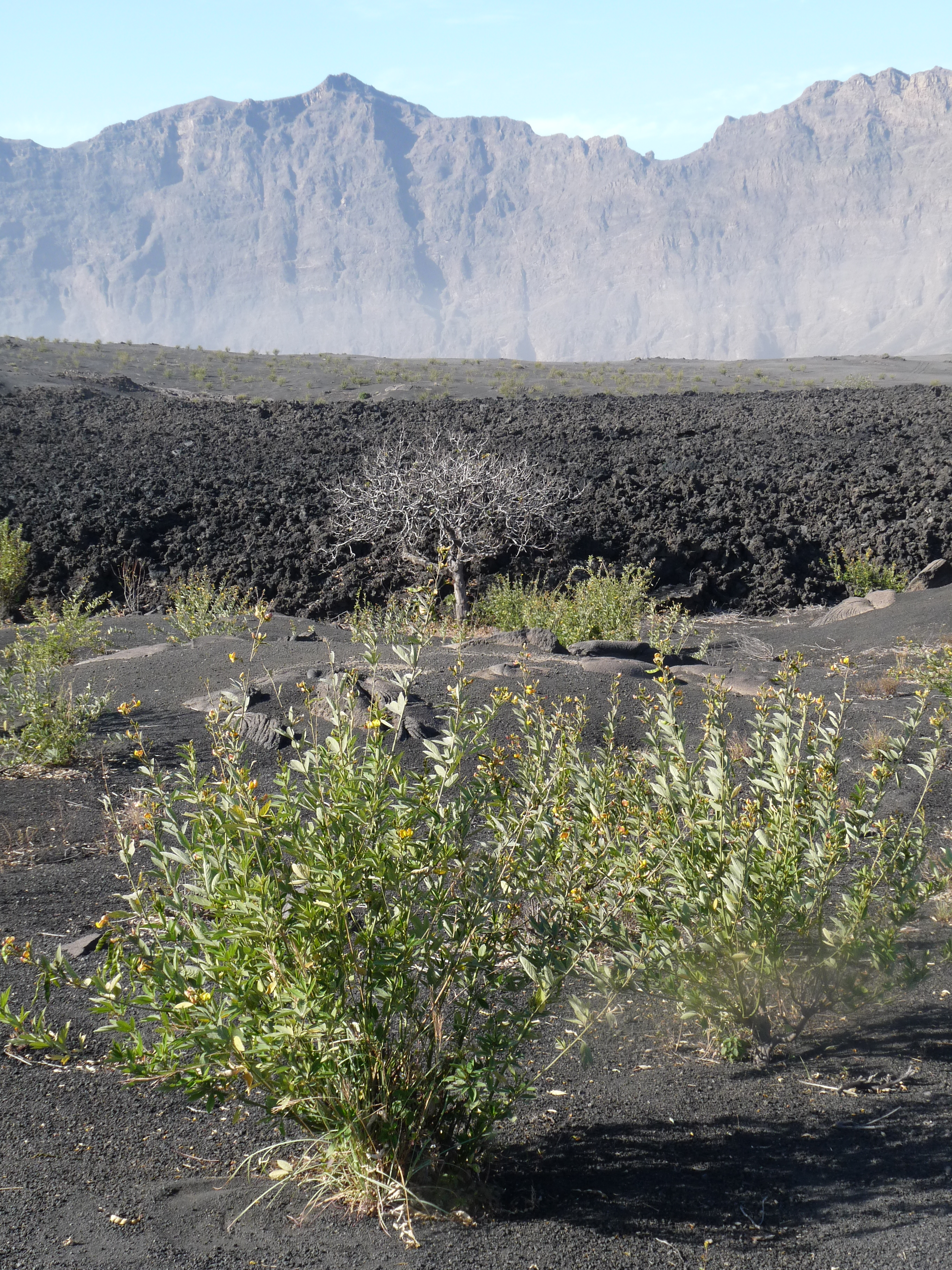
Naturalized pigeon peas growing on Cha das Caldeiras on Fogo island in Cape Verde

Legumes, which provide highly nutritious products and contribute to soil fertility through biological nitrogen fixation, are one of the most important crops in mixed crop-livestock systems. Cajanus cajan is an important legume crop with a high N-fixation ability (79% N derived from the atmosphere). Plant-growth promoting rhizobacteria (PGPR), together with strains of Rhizobium, can enhance growth and nitrogen fixation in pigeon pea by colonizing thenselves in the plant nodules. These bioinoculants can be added as a single species but also as combined communities. Using a single bioinoculant shows benefits, but mixed communitites of different bioinoculants have a greater positive impact on nodulation, plant dry mass, as well as shoot and root length. These different community species have different functions for the pigeon pea:

Bioinoculant	Function
Azotobacter chroococcum	promotes plant growth as a biofertilizer
Bacillus megaterium	produces nematode-targeting antibiotics and potentially influencing cytokinin signaling and supports the nitrogen yield of the plant especially during flowering and maturity stages
Pseudomonas fluorescens	produces bioactive metabolites and siderophores that combat plant pathogens and supports the denitrification process
Trichoderma harzianum	promotes soil health by production of enzymes and secondary metabolites that enhibit harmful soilborne pathogens and nutrient cycling by promoting root development

=== Pests and diseases ===
Pigeon pea is affected by a variety of pests and insects that can significantly impact crop yield and quality. They can infest the plant from seedling stage till harvest, therefore pests and diseases are the primary cause for low yields. The major pests are moths include the gram pod borer (Helicoverpa armigera), which causes defoliation and pod damage; the blue butterfly (Lampides boeticus), which infests buds, flowers, and young pods; and the spotted pod borer (Maruca vitrata), known for webbing together infested pods and flowers. The tur pod bug (Clavigralla gibbosa) is another significant pest of pigeon pea, causing substantial damage to pods and seeds. Current resistance efforts focus on breeding pigeon pea varieties with enhanced resistance to these pests. However, the presence of multiple pest species and the variability in pest pressure across regions pose challenges to achieving consistent resistance. Effective management techniques include integrated pest management (IPM) strategies such as crop rotation, intercropping with non-host plants, timely sowing, and the use of biological control agents like parasitoids and predators. Chemical control measures, including the application of insecticides like neem-based products and synthetic pyrethroids, are also employed when necessary.

Common diseases of pigeon pea:

1. Fusarium wilt (Fusarium udum)
2. Dry root rot (Macrophomina phaseolina)
3. Phytophthora blight (Phytophthora drechsleri)
4. Alternaria leaf spot (Alternaria alternata)
5. Powdery mildew (Leveillula taurica)
6. Sterility mosaic disease (Pigeon pea sterility mosaic virus)
7. Yellow mosaic virus (Mungbean yellow mosaic virus)

=== Breeding ===
Pigeonpea is unique among legumes in that its flowers support both cross-pollination and self-pollination. The bright, nectar-rich flowers attract pollinating insects, allowing natural outcrossing, which averages about 20% but varies with location due to pollinator populations. This level of outcrossing can lead to genetic contamination of parental lines and complicate the selection of lines by reducing the homozygosity of progeny. To mitigate these effects, breeders use techniques such as enclosing flowers in muslin bags or nets to prevent insect pollination. However, natural outcrossing also results in genetically diverse landraces and requires two to three generations of selfing before parental lines can be used in hybridisation programmes.

Over 50 years of pigeonpea breeding has resulted in genetic improvements, disease-resistant varieties, a reduction in crop maturity from 300 to less than 90 days, and the introduction of the first legume hybrid technology, which has increased yields by 30–50%. Despite these advances, yield per unit area has remained stable, with improved stability and diversification for farmers.

John Spence, a botanist and politician from Trinidad and Tobago, developed several varieties of dwarf pigeon peas which can be harvested by machine, instead of by hand.

=== Genome sequence ===
The pigeon pea is the first seed legume plant to have its complete genome sequenced. The sequencing was first accomplished by a group of 31 Indian scientists from the Indian Council of Agricultural Research. It was then followed by a global research partnership, the International Initiative for Pigeon pea Genomics (IIPG), led by ICRISAT with partners such as BGI–Shenzhen (China), US research laboratories like University of Georgia, University of California-Davis, Cold Spring Harbor Laboratory, and National Centre for Genome Resources, European research institutes like the National University of Ireland Galway. It also received support from the CGIAR Generation Challenge Program, US National Science Foundation and in-kind contribution from the collaborating research institutes. It is the first time that a CGIAR-supported research center such as ICRISAT led the genome sequencing of a food crop. There was a controversy over this as CGIAR did not partner with a national team of scientists and broke away from the Indo American Knowledge Initiative to start their own sequencing in parallel.

The 616 mature microRNAs and 3919 long non-codingRNAs sequences were identified in the genome of pigeon pea.

==== Dehulling ====
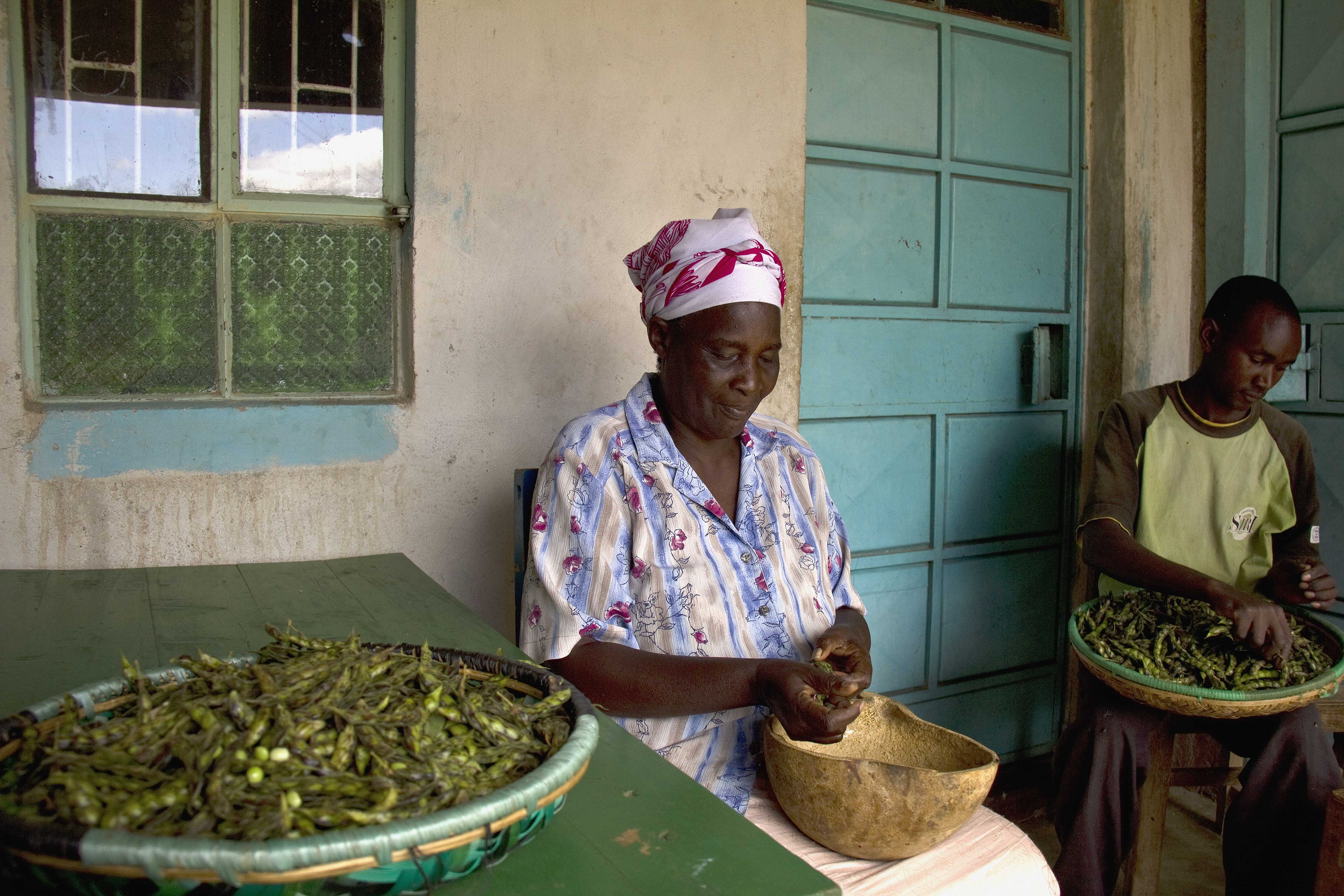
Kenyans shelling pigeon peas

There are various methods of removing the pulse from its shell. In earlier days hand pounding was common. Several traditional methods are used that can be broadly classified under two categories: the wet method and the dry method. The Wet method Involves water soaking, sun drying and dehulling. The Dry method Involves oil/water application, drying in the sun, and dehulling. Depending on the magnitude of operation, large-scale commercial dehulling of large quantities of pigeon pea into its deskinned, split version, known as toor dal in Hindi, is done in mechanically operated mills.

== Uses ==
=== Food ===
Pigeon peas are both a food crop (dried peas, flour, or green vegetable peas) and a forage/cover crop. In combination with cereals, pigeon peas make a well-balanced meal and hence are favored by nutritionists as an essential ingredient for balanced diets. The dried peas may be sprouted briefly, then cooked, for a flavor different from the green or dried peas.

==== Africa ====
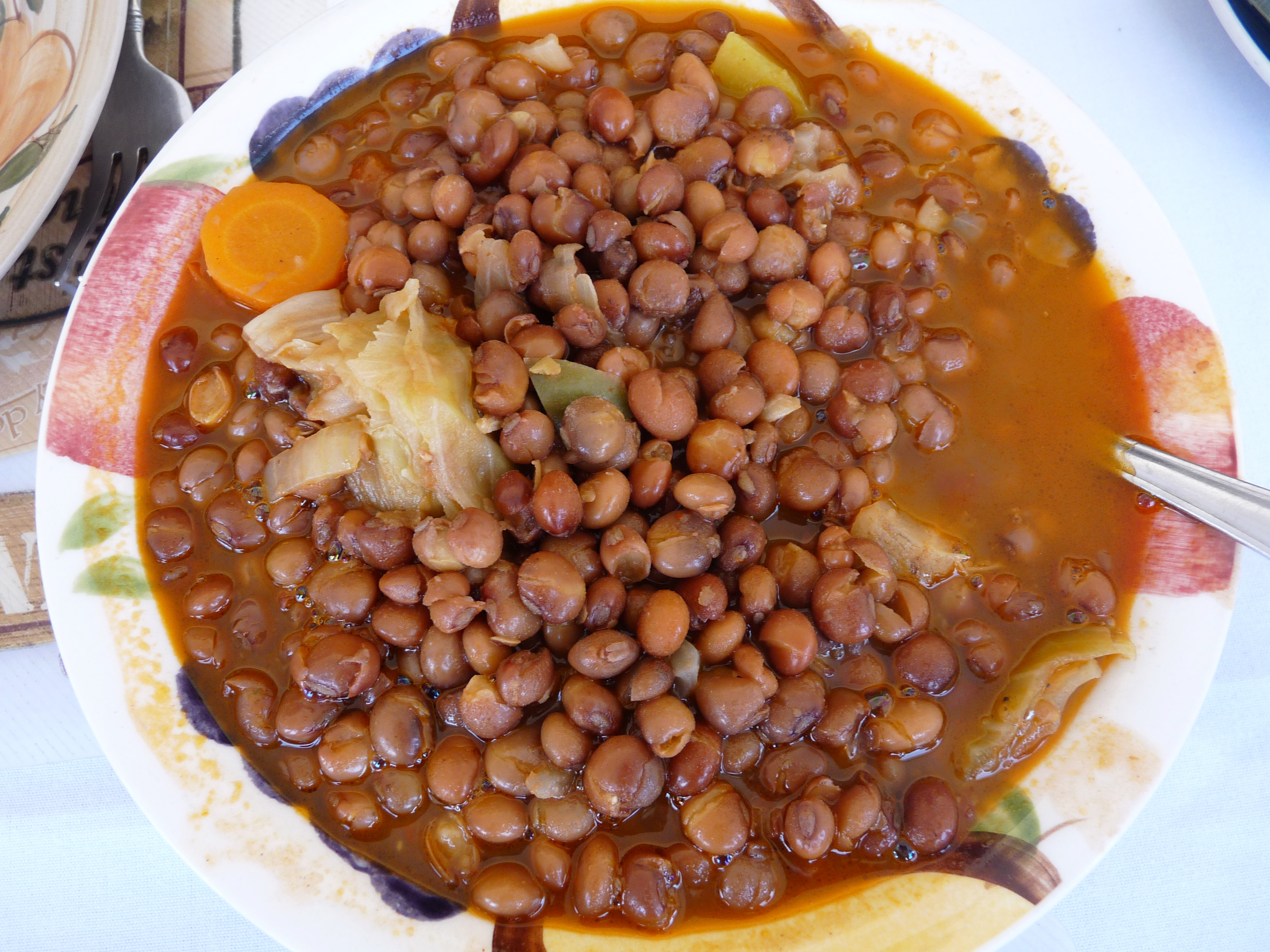
A bowl of Cape Verdean fixon Kongu

In Cape Verde they make a soup with the dried pigeon peas called feijão Congo, after its own name, made with dried pigeon peas in a similar manner to Brazilian feijoada.

In Kenya and throughout the Swahili-speaking region of East Africa, pigeon peas are utilized in dishes such as mbaazi na mahamri, that is usually served for breakfast.

In the Enugu state of Nigeria, an Igbo dish called Ẹchịcha or Achịcha is made with palm oil, cocoyam, and seasoning. It is also similar to other dishes from the state such as ayarya ji and fio-fio.

In Ethiopia, the pods, the young shoots and leaves, are cooked and eaten.

==== Asia ====
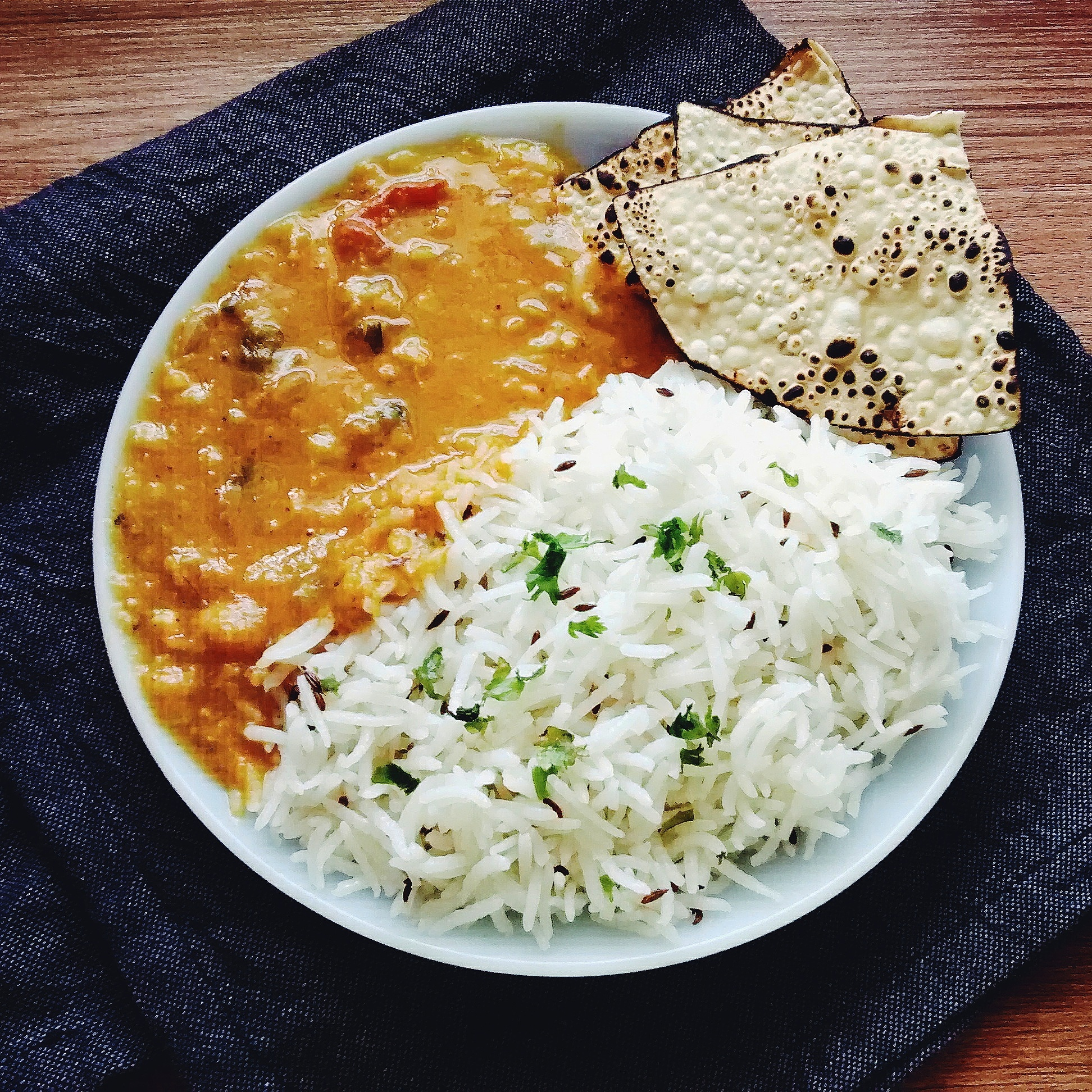
Dal/pappu and rice, the twice-daily staple meal for most people in India and the Indian subcontinent

In India, it is one of the most popular pulses, being an important source of protein in a mostly vegetarian diet. It is the primary accompaniment to rice or roti and has the status of staple food throughout the length and breadth of India. In regions where it grows, fresh young pods are eaten as a vegetable in dishes such as sambar.

In the Western Visayas region of the Philippines, pigeon peas are the main ingredient of a very popular dish called "KBL"—an acronym for "Kadyos" (pigeon pea), "Baboy" (pork), and "Langka" (jackfruit). It is a savory soup with rich flavors coming from the pigeon peas, smoked pork preferably the legs or tail, and souring agent called batuan. Raw jackfruit meat is chopped and boiled to soft consistency, and serves as an extender. The violet color of the soup comes from the pigment of the variety commonly grown in the region.

==== Americas ====
In the Caribbean coast of Colombia, such as the Atlántico department of Colombia, the sopa de guandú con carne salada (or simply "gandules") is made with pigeon peas, yam, plantain, yuca, and spices. During the week of Semana santa a sweet is made out of pigeon peas called dulce de guandules which is made by mashed and sweetened pigeon peas with origins in the maroon community of San Basilio de Palenque.

In the Dominican Republic, a dish made of rice and green pigeon peas called moro de guandules is a traditional holiday food. It is also consumed as guandules guisados, which is a savoury stew with coconut and squash served with white rice. A variety of sancocho is also made based on green pigeon peas that includes poultry, pork, beef, yams, yucca, squash, plantain and others. Dominicans have a high regard for this legume and it is consumed widely.

In Panama, pigeon peas are used in a dish called Arroz con guandú y coco or "rice with pigeon peas and coconut" traditionally prepared and consumed during the end of year holidays.

In Puerto Rico, arroz con gandules is made with rice and pigeon peas and sofrito which is a traditional dish, especially during Christmas season. Pigeon peas can also be made in to a stew called asopao de gandules, with plantain balls. Escabeche de gandules is a spicy pickled pigeon pea salad typically served with bread. Pigeon peas are also used to make hummus on the island and called hummus de gandules.

Jamaica also uses pigeon peas instead of kidney beans in their rice and peas dish, especially during the Christmas season.

Trinidad and Tobago and Grenada have their own variant, called pelau, which includes either beef or chicken, and occasionally pumpkin and pieces of cured pig tail.

Unlike in some other parts of the Greater Caribbean, in The Bahamas pigeon peas are used in dried form, light brown in color to make the heartier, heavier, signature Bahamian staple dish "Peas 'n Rice."

==== Oceania ====
In Hawaii they are used to make a dish called gandule rice, also called godule rice, gundule rice, and ganduddy rice originates on the island from the Puerto Rican community with historic ties to the island and is prepared in a similar manner to that of traditional Puerto Rican arroz con gandules.

=== Agricultural ===
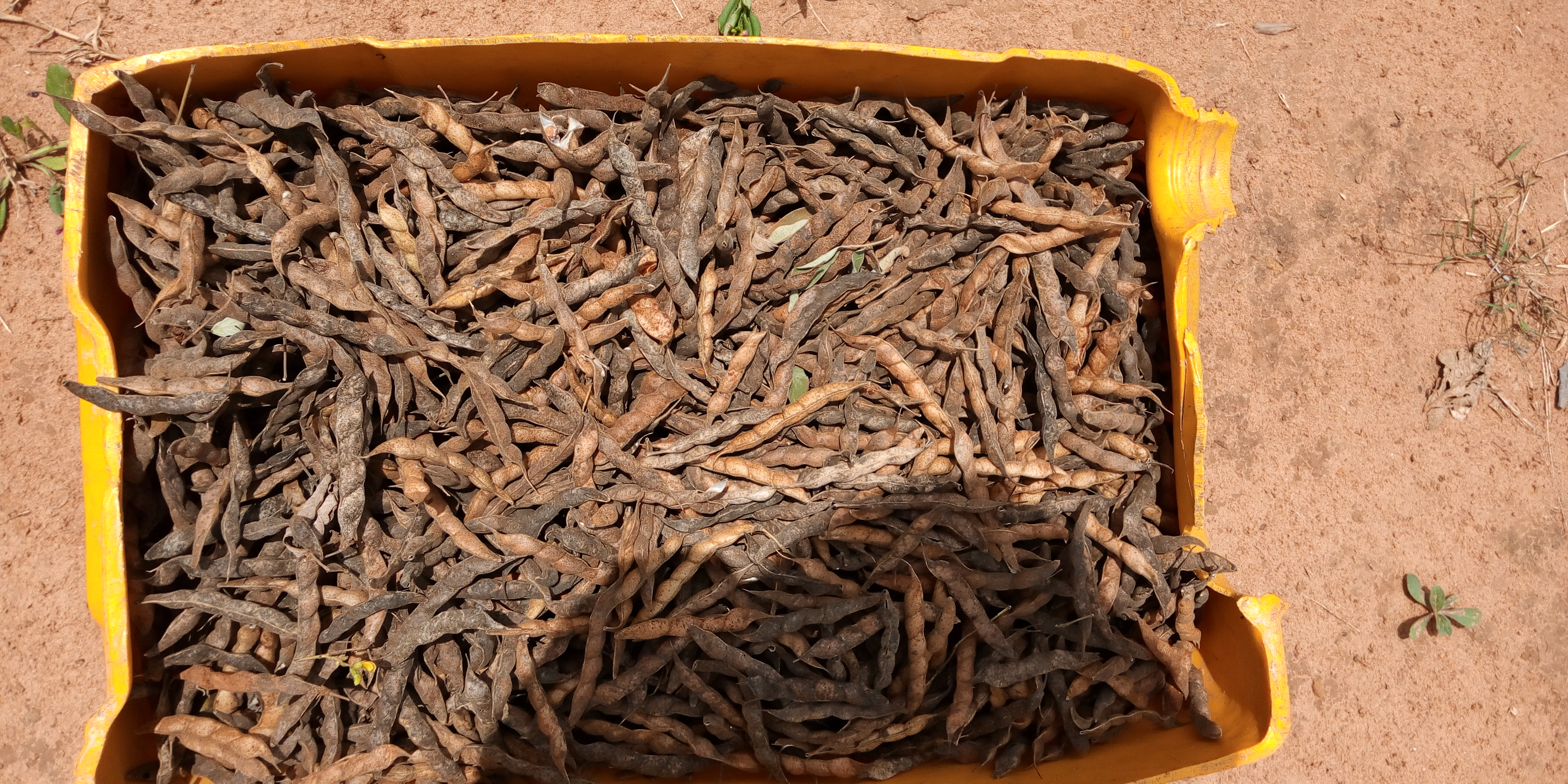
Harvested pods of pigeon peas in Benin

It is an important ingredient of animal feed used in West Africa, especially in Nigeria, where it is also grown. Leaves, pods, seeds and the residues of seed processing are used to feed all kinds of livestock.

In the Congo pigeon peas are utilized as one of the main food forest and soil improvement crops after using a slash-and-burn fire technique called maala.

Pigeon peas are in some areas an important crop for green manure, providing up to 90 kg nitrogen per hectare. The woody stems of pigeon peas can also be used as firewood, fencing, thatch and as a source for rope fiber.

=== Medicinal ===
Pigeon pea has been valued for its medicinal properties since prehistoric times in various regions, including Africa, Egypt and Asia. Today, different countries use different parts of the plant to treat a range of diseases as an alternative medicine. In the Republic of Congo the Kongo, Lari, and Dondo people use the sap of the leaves as an eyedrop for epilepsy. In Nigeria the leaves are used to treat malaria, while in India they are used to treat diabetes, stomach tumours and wounds. In Oman, pigeon pea is used to treat chronic diseases, and in traditional Chinese medicine it is used to relieve pain and control intestinal worms. In Africa, the seeds are used to treat hepatitis and measles. The widespread traditional medicinal use of the plant is attributed to its rich content of phenolic compounds, which have antiviral, anti-inflammatory, antioxidant, hypocholesterolemic and hypoglycaemic effects. The leaves also contain flavonoids, terpenoids, essential oils and coumarin, which further enhance its therapeutic potential in the fight against disease. There are different studies looking at how the medicinal compounds of pigeon pea could be used in future. One study, using rats, found that a pigeonpea beverage could be used as an anti-diabetic functional drink. This drink would help to reduce plasma glucose and total cholesterol levels and increase plasma antioxidant status. Therefore, it could be used in future as an alternative strategy to maintain plasma glucose and cholesterol at normal levels and help prevent diabetes complications. Furthermore, pigeon pea could be used as a fermented food as this would increase its antioxidant levels and therefore, have an antiatherosclerotic effect. This would help to improve systolic blood pressure as well as diastolic blood pressure. This benefits cardiovascular health and could be developed as a new dietary supplement or functional food that prevents hypertension.

In Madagascar the branches have been used as a teeth cleaning twig.

== See also ==
- List of pigeon pea diseases
