= Biofertilizer =

Substance with micro-organisms

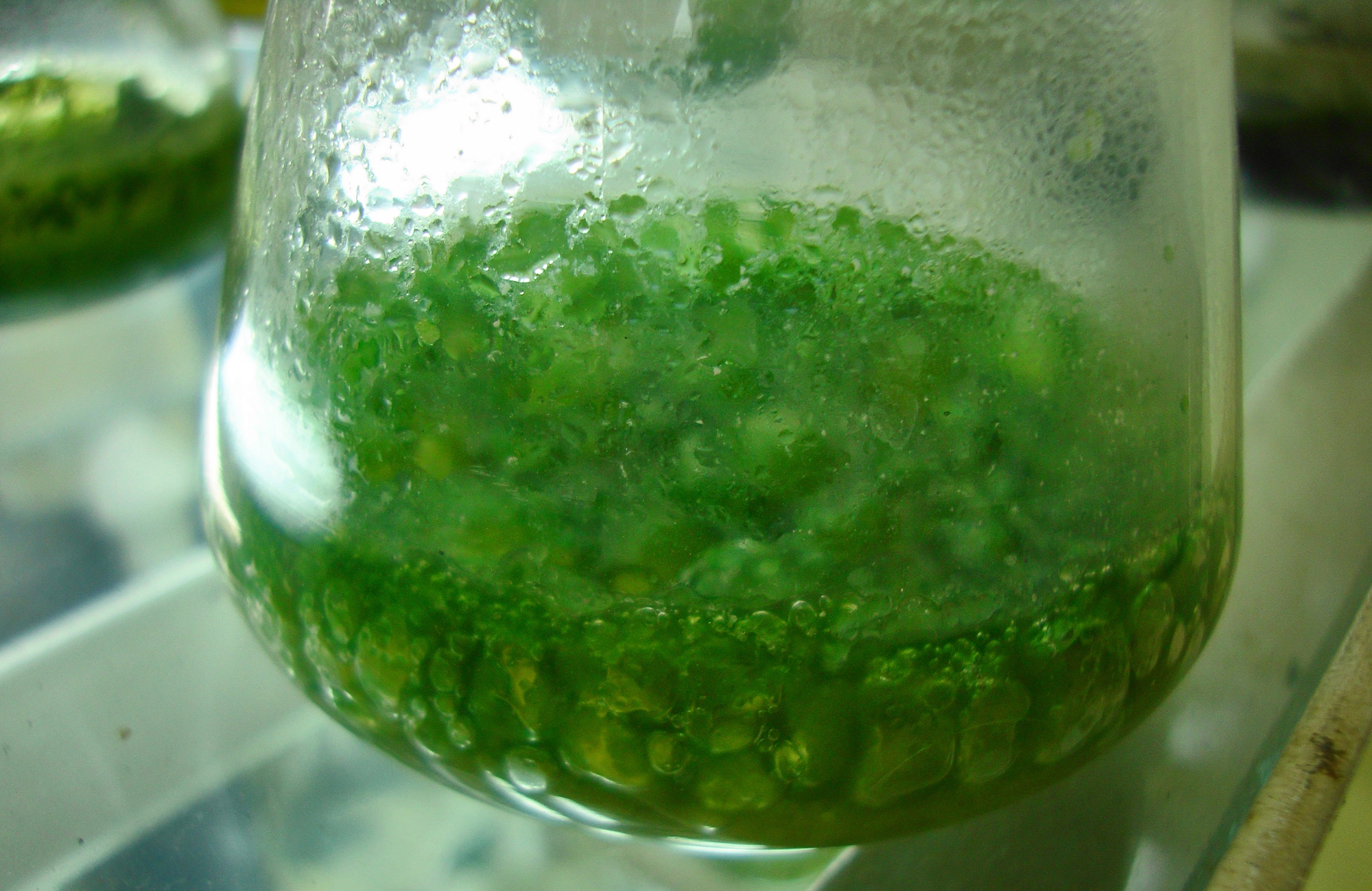
Blue-green algae cultured in specific media. Blue-green algae can be helpful in agriculture as they have the capability to fix atmospheric nitrogen to soil. This nitrogen is helpful to the crops. Blue-green algae is used as a biofertilizer.

A biofertilizer is a substance containing living micro-organisms which, when applied to seeds, plant surfaces, or soil, colonize the rhizosphere or the interior of the plant and promote growth by increasing the supply or availability of primary nutrients to the host plant.

Biofertilizers add nutrients through the natural processes of nitrogen fixation, solubilizing phosphorus, and stimulating plant growth through the synthesis of growth-promoting substances. The micro-organisms in biofertilizers restore the soil's natural nutrient cycle and build soil organic matter. Through the use of biofertilizers, healthy plants can be grown, while enhancing the sustainability and the health of the soil. Biofertilizers can be expected to reduce the use of synthetic fertilizers and pesticides, but they are not yet able to replace their use. As of 2024, more than 340 biofertilizer products have been approved for commercial use in the US.

== Composition ==
Biofertilizers provide "eco-friendly" organic agro-inputs. Rhizobium, Azotobacter, Azospirillum and blue-green algae (BGA) are perhaps the species with the longest history of use as biofertilizers. Rhizobium inoculant is used for leguminous crops. Azotobacter can be used with crops like wheat, maize, mustard, cotton, potato, and other vegetable crops. Azospirillum inoculations are recommended mainly for sorghum, millets, maize, sugarcane, and wheat. Blue-green algae belonging to the cyanobacteria genera Nostoc, Anabaena, Tolypothrix, and Aulosira fix atmospheric nitrogen and are used as inoculants for paddy crops grown in both upland and lowland conditions. Anabaena, in association with the water fern Azolla, can contribute nitrogen up to 60 kg/ha/season and can also enrich soils with organic matter. Seaweeds are rich in various types of mineral elements (potassium, phosphorus, trace elements, etc.), hence they are extensively used as a form of manure replacement by people of coastal districts. Seaweed-fertilizer also helps in breaking down clays. Fucus is used by Irish people as a biofertilizer on a large scale. In tropical countries, the bottom mud from dried-up ponds which contain abundant blue-green algae is regularly used as biofertilizer in fields.

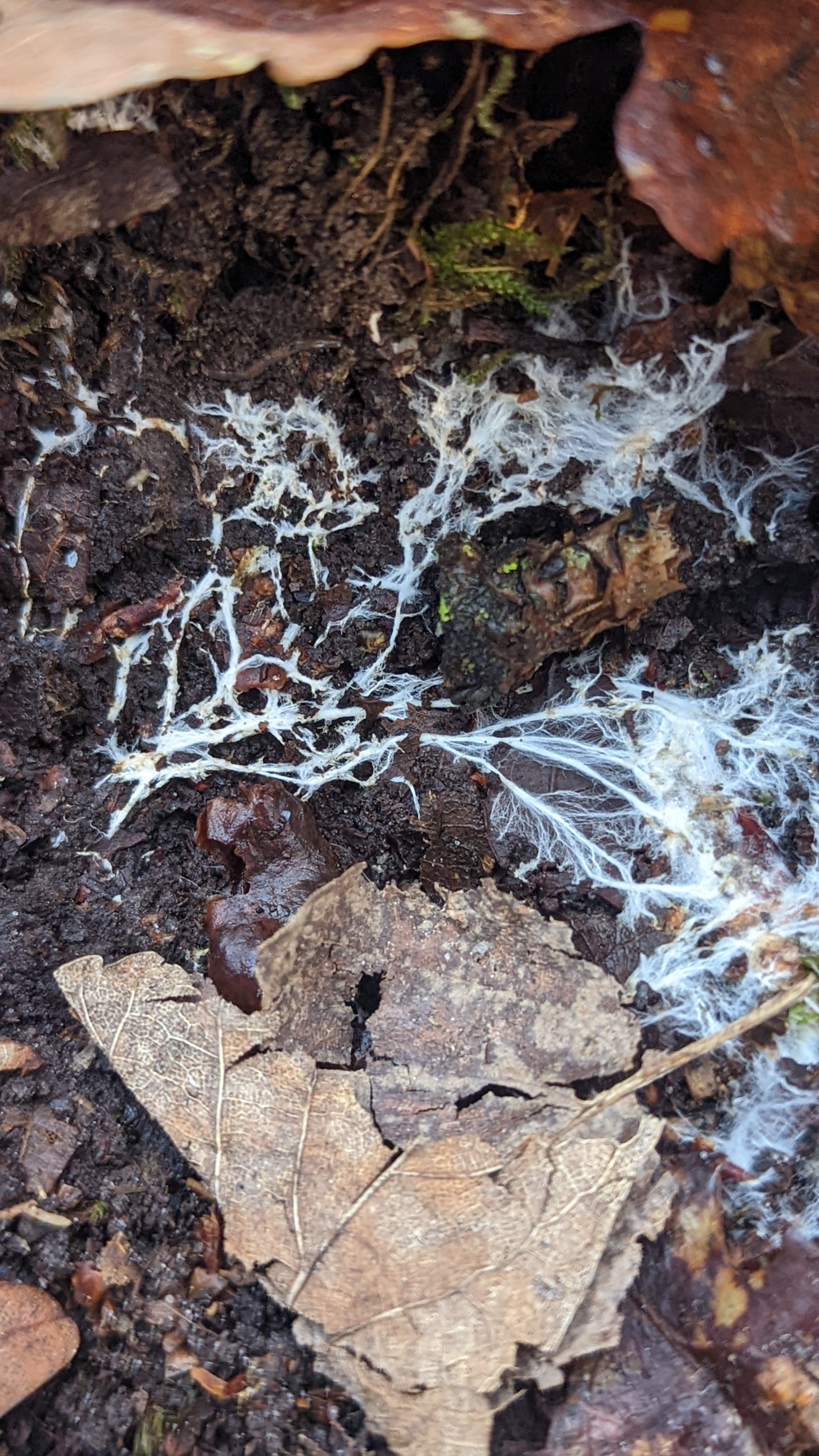
Mycorrhizal fungi promote bioavailability of nutrients for plants

=== Bacteria ===
Plant-Growth Promoting Microorganisms:

- Rhizobium: Symbiotic nitrogen fixation by Rhizobium with legumes contributes substantially to total nitrogen fixation. Rhizobium inoculation is a well-known agronomic practice to ensure adequate nitrogen. One of the most widespread species is R. leguminosarum.
- Bradyrhizobium spp. (in particular Bradyrhizobium japonicum).
- Bacillus spp. (in particular B. amyloliquefaciens, B. mojavensis, B. thuringiensis, B. licheniformis, and B. subtilis).
- Priestia megaterium
- Azotobacter spp. (A. chroococcum, A. vinelandii)
- Pseudomonas (P. fluorescens)
- Streptomyces sp.
- Azospirilium
- Streptomyces grisoflavus

=== Fungi ===
Mycorrhizal fungi such as:

- Glomus spp.
- Rhizophagus irregularis
- Gigaspora spp. (in particular G. margarita)
- Trichoderma spp. (such as T. viride, T. harzianum, T. reesei, T. longibrachiatum, T. atroviride, T. koningii)
- Epichloë spp.

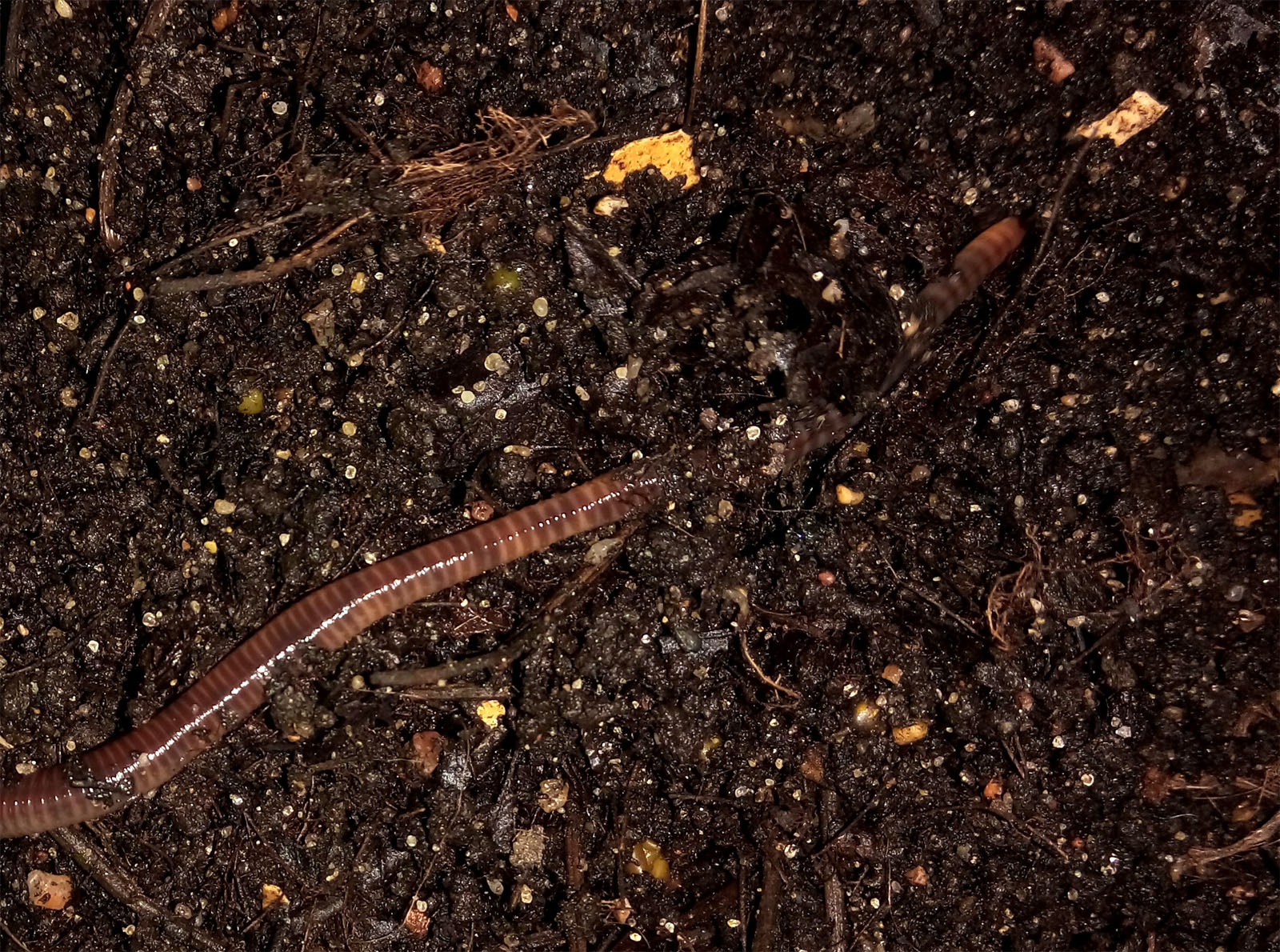
Vermicompost-tea is often used in organic farming as biofertilizer.

=== Archaea ===
- Nitrososphaerota (in particular Nitrosocosmicus oleophilus)
- Euryarchaeota

=== Organic matter ===
- Compost is commonly used as biofertilizers. It can be used directly on the soil or by using compost-derived products such as extracts or compost-tea made by fermenting compost mass. Vermicompost-based innoculants proposed by permaculture methods, Korean natural farming and JADAM are examples of biofertilizers. In Brazil, fermented microbial consortia have also been developed for tropical soil conditions, combining beneficial bacteria and fungi adapted to high-temperature environments. "Seed balls" using a mixture of clay and compost proposed by the Fukuoka Method could also be seen as biofertilizer. Mixtures of compost with other organic materials such as Chitosan (which helps elicit plant defense), or non-organic materials such as Montmorillonite-Illite clay and Diatomaceous earth are also often used to increase the minerals to support organism growth.
- Manure
- Duckweed

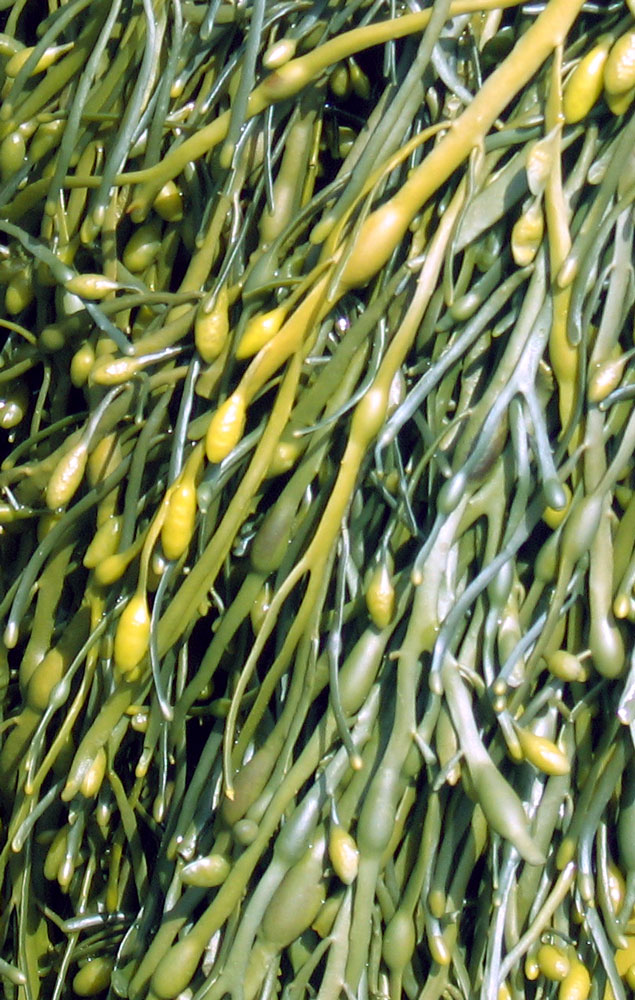
Kelp has very high nutrient density

Seaweed and blue green algae:

- Kelp (in particular Ascophyllum nodosum)
- Chlorella vulgaris
- Nannochloropsis
- Scenedesmus

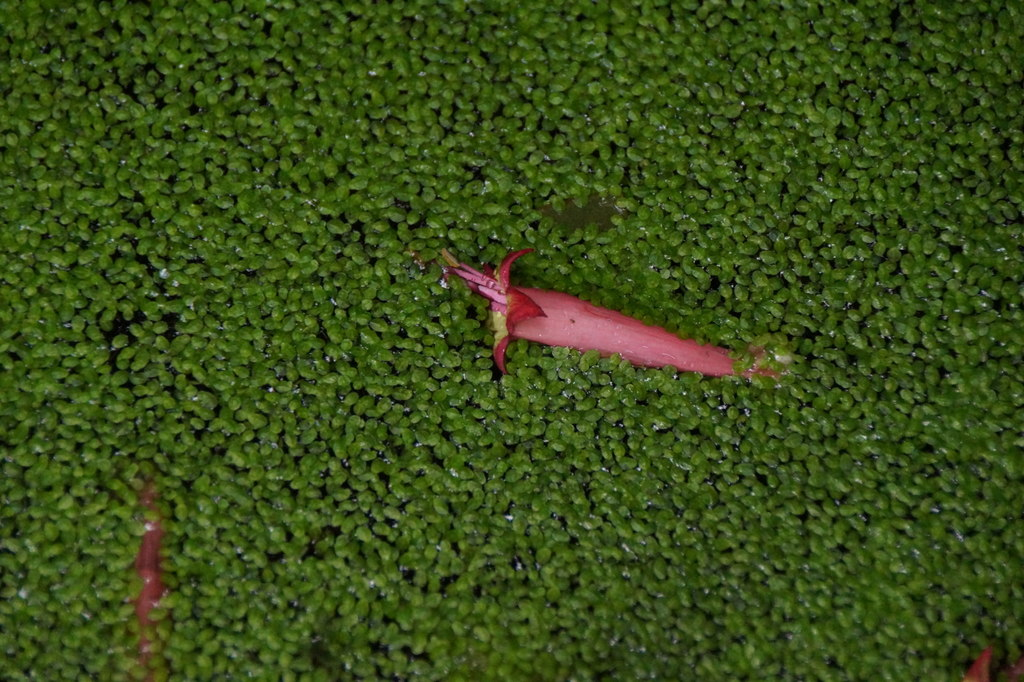
Duckweed has been studied as a biofertilizer

Cyanobacteria:

- Spirulina
- Nostoc
- Tolypothrix
- Aulosira
- Anabena

== Mechanisms ==
Biofertilizers work through multiple mechanisms. Plant-growth promoting rhizobacteria (PGPR) and mycorrhizae are generally thought to increase the fixation of atmospheric nitrogen, convert inorganic phosphorus compounds into soluble forms, increase the bioavailability of minerals in the soil, and synthesize phytohormones that promote growth, such as auxins and gibberellin. Another mechanism proposed is the AAC-deaminase production of Bacillus species, which prevents excessive increases in the synthesis of ethylene under various stress conditions.

== Benefits ==
Biofertilizers are cost-effective and ecofriendly in nature, and their continuous usage has been shown to enhance soil fertility. Besides promoting growth by multiple mechanisms, biofertilizers produces substances suppressing phytopathogens, guarding plants from abiotic and biotic stresses and detoxification of belowground pollutants. Extensive use of agrochemicals in agricultural practices has been found to cause environmental disturbances and public health hazards affecting food security and sustainability in agriculture. Biofertilizers offers an alternative solution for such agrochemicals, and show yield increase of up to about 10–40% by increasing protein contents, essential amino acids, and vitamins, and by nitrogen fixation.

Since a bio-fertilizer is technically living, it can symbiotically associate with plant roots. Involved microorganisms could readily and safely convert complex organic material into simple compounds, so that they are easily taken up by the plants. Microorganism function is in long duration, causing improvement of the soil fertility. It maintains the natural habitat of the soil. It increases crop yield by 20-30%, replaces chemical nitrogen and phosphorus by 30%, and stimulates plant growth. It can also provide protection against drought and some soil-borne diseases. It has also been shown that to produce a larger quantity of crops, biofertilizers with the ability of nitrogen fixation and phosphorus solubilizing would lead to the greatest possible effect. They advance shoot and root growth of many crops versus control groups. This can be important when implementing new seed growth.

== Future Research ==
Biofertilizers have been shown to have varying effects in different environments, and even within the same environment. This is something that many scientists have been working on, however there is no perfect solution at this time. They however, have been shown to have the most profound effects in drier climates. In the future, it is hoped that biofertilizers effects will be better controlled and regulated in all environments, as well as analysis targeted at specific species.

== See also ==
- Bioeffector
- Endophyte
- Microbial inoculant
- Rhizobacteria
- Fertilizer
- Seaweed fertilizer
