= Streptomyces anandii =

Scientific classification
- Domain: Bacteria
- Kingdom: Bacillati
- Phylum: Actinomycetota
- Class: Actinomycetia
- Order: Streptomycetales
- Family: Streptomycetaceae
- Genus: Streptomyces
- Species: S. anandii

Binomial name
- Streptomyces anandii Batra and Bajaj 1965

Type strain
- ATCC 19388, BCRC 11825, CBS 739.72, CCRC 11825, CGMCC 4.1314, DSM 40535, g6, IFO 13438, ISP 5535, ITCC 1233, JCM 4720, KCC S-0720, KCCM 40192, KCTC 9687, KCTC 9754, LMG 8600, NBRC 13438, NRRL B-12487, NRRL B-3590, NRRL B-B-12487, NRRL-ISP 5535, RIA 1399, VKM Ac-1920

Species of bacterium

Streptomyces anandii is a bacterium species from the genus Streptomyces which has been isolated from soil from in the region of Al-Taif in Saudi Arabia. Streptomyces anandii produces pentaene G8, gilvocarcin V, gilvocarcin M and gilvocarcin E.

== See also ==
- List of Streptomyces species
