= Seaweed fertiliser =

Organic fertilizer made from seaweed

Seaweed fertiliser is organic fertilizer made from seaweed that is used in agriculture to increase soil fertility and plant growth. The use of seaweed fertilizer dates back to antiquity and has a broad array of benefits for the soils.

Seaweed fertilizer can be applied in a number of different forms, including refined liquid extracts and dried, pulverized organic material. Through its composition of various bioactive molecules, seaweed functions as a strong soil conditioner, bio-remediator, and biological pest control, with each seaweed phylum offering various benefits to soil and crop health. These benefits can include increased tolerance to abiotic stressors, improved soil texture and water retention, and reduced occurrence of diseases.

On a broader socio-ecological scale, seaweed aquaculture and fertilizer development have significant roles in biogeochemical nutrient cycling through carbon storage and the uptake of nitrogen and phosphorus. Seaweed fertilizer application to soils can also alter the structure and function of microbial communities. Seaweed aquaculture has the potential to yield ecosystem services by providing a source of nutrition to human communities and a mechanism for improving water quality in natural systems and aquaculture operations.

The rising popularity of organic farming practices is drawing increased attention towards the various applications of seaweed-derived fertilizers and soil additives. While the seaweed fertilizer industry is still in its infancy, it holds significant potential for sustainable economic development as well as the reduction of nutrient runoff in coastal systems. There are however ongoing challenges associated with the use and production of seaweed fertilizer including the spread of diseases and invasive species, the risk of heavy-metal accumulation, and the efficiency and refinement of production methods.

== Nomenclature and taxonomy ==
"Seaweed" is one of the common names given to multicellular macroalgae, such as green algae (Chlorophyta), brown algae (Phaeophyceae), and red algae (Rhodophyta). The term, seaweed is sometimes used to refer to microalgae and plants as well. Seaweeds are typically benthic organisms which have a structure called a holdfast, that keeps them anchored to the sea floor; they also have a stipe, otherwise known as a stem, and blade-shaped foliage. Sargassum seaweed is one exception to this anatomy and function, as it does not attach to the benthic environment. The color of seaweeds generally follows depth/light, with green seaweeds, brown seaweeds, and red seaweeds corresponding to shallow, moderate, and deeper waters respectively; red seaweeds are sometimes found up to 30 meters in depth. The smallest seaweeds grow only a few millimeters in height, while the largest seaweeds can grow up to 50 meters in height. There are an estimated 1,800 green, 1,800 brown, and 6,200 red seaweed species in existence. Brown seaweeds are generally known as kelp, but are also known by other common names such as rockweed and wracks. Red seaweeds are the most diverse group of seaweed, and along with green seaweeds, are most closely related to terrestrial plants, whereas brown seaweeds are the most distantly related to terrestrial plants. Seaweeds are found extensively in shallow natural environments, and farmed both in the ocean and in land-based aquaculture operations. Most brown seaweeds that are found in the wild are from the genera Laminaria, Undaria, Hizikia, whereas most brown seaweeds that are farmed for uses such as fertilizer and heavy metal indication, are from the species Ascophyllum, Ecklonia, Fucus, Sargassum. Green seaweeds that are used as bioindicators, for heavy metal indication for example, are from the genera Ulva and Enteromorpha. Red seaweed from the genus Poryphora, is commonly used for human food.

== History ==
The first written record of agricultural use seaweed was from ancient Greek and Roman civilizations in the 2nd century, where foraged beach castings were used to feed livestock and wrap plant roots for preservation. However, stable isotope analysis of prehistoric sheep teeth in Orkney indicate that early peoples used seaweed as livestock fodder over 5,000 years ago, and researchers speculate that foraged seaweed was also used as fertilizer because ashed remnants of seaweed were found in archeological sites. Such agricultural techniques might have been key to the survival of early settlements in Scotland.

Historical records and archaeological evidence of seaweed fertilizer use in the coastal Atlantic are vast and scattered, ranging from Scandinavia to Portugal, from the Neolithic period through the 20th century. Most details of seaweed fertilizer use come from the British Isles, Channel Islands, Normandy and Brittany (France), where a variety of application techniques were used over the centuries, and some continue to this day. Ireland has a long history (12th century) of harvesting seaweed for fertilizing nutrient-poor post glacial soils using composted manure as enrichment and the increased agricultural productivity allowed the Irish population to grow substantially. The Channel Islands (12th century) used a dried blend of red and brown seaweeds, called "Vraic" or "wrack", to spread over potato fields during the winter months to enrich before planting the crop in the spring. Similarly, coastal people in Normandy and Brittany have been collecting "wrack" using wood rakes since the neolithic period, though the fertilizer composition originally included all marine debris that washed ashore. In 17th–19th century Scotland, Fucus spp. were cultivated by placing rocky substrate in the intertidal zones to encourage seaweed settlement. The seaweed biomass was then used in composted trenches, where crops (potatoes, oats, wheat, onions) were grown directly in the sandy fertilizer mixture. This 'lazy bed' method afforded minimal crop rotation and allowed rugged landscape and acidic soils to be farmed, where plant growth was otherwise unsuitable. The high value of seaweed in these regions caused political disputes over harvesting rights and in Ireland such rights were established before the country itself. These early applications of seaweed fertilizer were limited to coastlines, where the macroalgae could be harvested from the intertidal or collected after a storm washed it to shore. However, dried wrack mixtures or ashed 'fucus' potash could be transported further inland because it weighs less than wet seaweed.

Seaweed fertilizer spread inland when a kelp industry developed in Scotland, Norway, and Brittany in the 18th and 19th century. The industry developed out of demand for ashed soda, or potash, which was used to create glass and soap, and led to shortages for agricultural applications in traditional coastal communities. Potash is a water-soluble potassium rich concentrate made from plant matter, so it was also exported as a fertilizer. Coastal communities in the seaweed industry both expanded and struggled to keep up with the demand. Early commercial kelp export in Scotland devastated traditional agriculture in the region because intensive labor was needed during the seaweed growing season to harvest and process the kelp, which led to a labor transition from farming to kelp processing. Additionally, exploitation of kelp resources for potash production left little kelp behind for local fertilizer and coastal land became more desirable than inland regions. The Scottish seaweed industry went through multiple boom and bust cycles, employing 10,000 families and producing 3,000 tonnes of ash per year during its peak. The export price of kelp ash dropped in 1822, leading to a sudden emigration from the area because the crop was no longer profitable enough to support such a large industry. Kelp exploitation and toxic ash processing caused ecological and economic damage in Orkney and left many people sick and blinded. The kelp industry picked up again for iodine production in 1845, and alginate (a thickening agent) production in the early 1900s, which reinvigorated kelp harvest.

Global production of seaweed fertilizer largely phased out when chemical fertilizers were developed in the 1920s, due to the cheaper production cost. Chemical fertilizers revolutionized the agriculture industry and allowed the human population to grow far beyond the limits of traditional food production methods. Synthetic fertilizers are still the predominant global source for commercial agricultural applications due to the cheap cost of production and widespread access. However, small scale organic farmers and coastal communities continued traditional seaweed techniques in regions with a rich seaweed history. The first industrial kelp liquid fertilizer, Maxicrop, was created by Reginald Milton in 1947. The creation of liquid fertilizer has allowed for more widespread application of seaweed-derived fertilizer to inland regions and sparked a growing agronomic interest in seaweed for a variety of agricultural applications, including foliage spray, biostimulants, and soil conditioning. Interestingly, the historic rise of seaweed aquaculture did not align with fertilizer production because the European countries that produce seaweed fertilizer haven't developed a significant aquaculture industry; seaweed farming is also currently dominated by China and Indonesia, where the crop is grown for food and other lucrative uses.

== Aquaculture ==
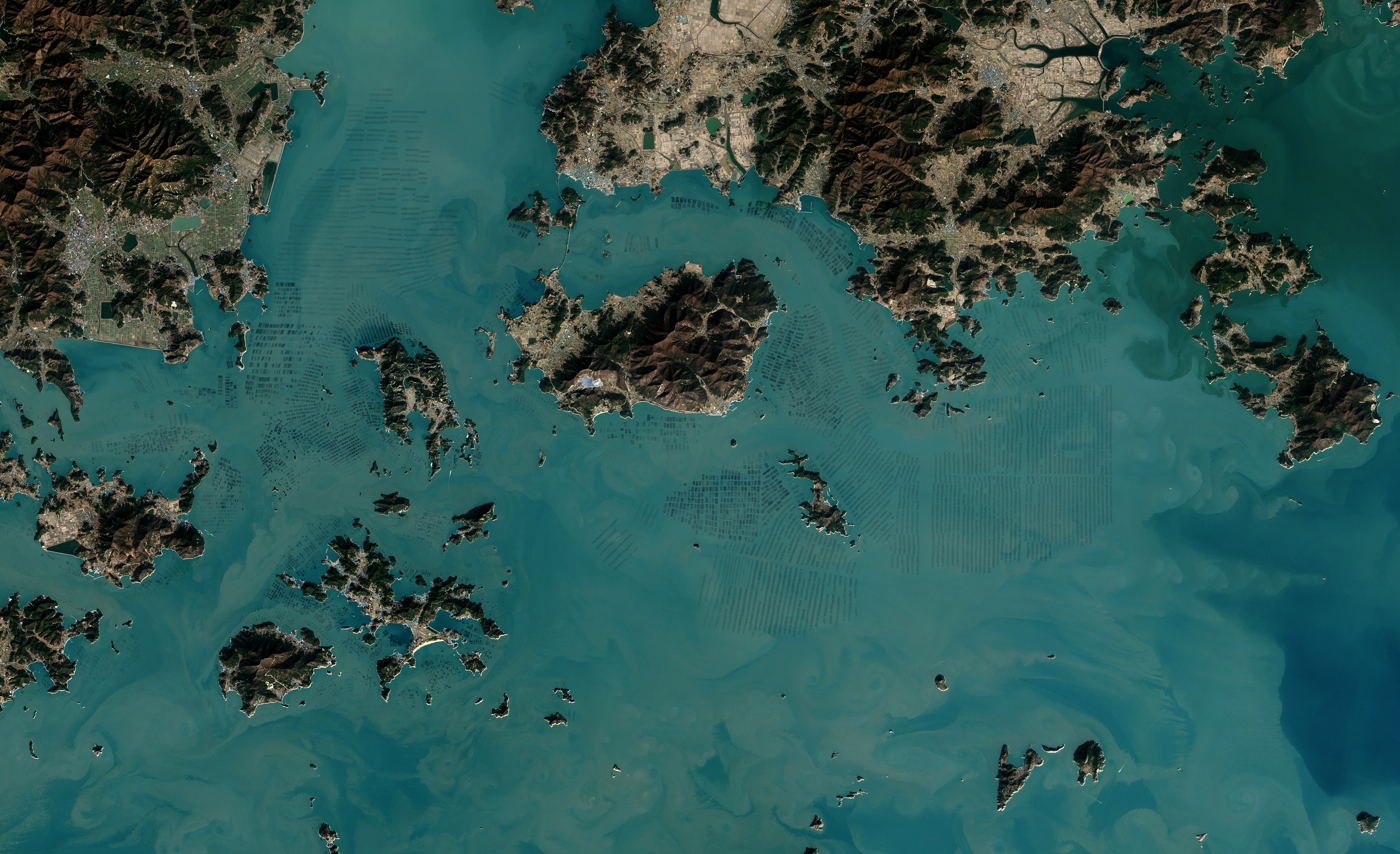
A satellite image of seaweed aquaculture off the southern coast of South Korea. The dark squares displayed in the image are fields of seaweed growing.

The development of modern seaweed mariculture/aquaculture has allowed the expansion of seaweed fertilizer research and improved processing methods since the 1950s. Seaweed has been cultivated in Asian countries for food production for centuries, but seaweed aquaculture is now growing rapidly across the world for specialty use in biofuel, agar, cosmetics, medicine, and bioplastics. The nascent agricultural seaweed sector, including animal feed, soil additives, and agrochemicals, makes up less than 1% of the overall global value of seaweed aquaculture. However, significant interest in agricultural applications of the crop has increased dramatically since 1950, as specialty agrochemical uses for seaweed materials have been demonstrated through scientific research. Increased concern over the depletion and degradation of marine resources in the past century, coupled with the threats of climate change, has increased global interest in sustainable solutions for blue economic development of the oceans. Seaweed aquaculture is promoted as a solution to expand novel industry development and food security while simultaneously restoring damaged ecosystems. Unlike terrestrial crops, growing seaweed requires no land, feed, fertilizers, pesticides, and water resources. Different seaweeds also offer a variety of ecosystem services (discussed below), which contribute to the growing popularity of seaweed as a bioremediation crop. Fertilizer plays an important role in sustainable seaweed aquaculture development because seaweed farming can help alleviate excess nutrient loading associated with terrestrial chemical fertilizer run-off and applying organic seaweed fertilizer on soil closes the nutrient loop between land and sea. Additionally, seaweed fertilizer can be produced using by-products from other industries or raw materials that are unsuitable for human consumption, such as rotting or infected biomass or biowaste products from carrageenan processing methods. Seaweed aquaculture is also important for supporting sustainable growth of the seaweed fertilizer industry because it limits the potential for exploitation of native seaweed for commercial interests. However, the nascent seaweed aquaculture industry faces a number of challenges to sustainable development, as discussed below. Environmental impacts of seaweed harvest and production need to be carefully scrutinized to protect coastal communities and maintain the socioeconomic benefits of using seaweed resources in industry.

=== Ecosystem services ===
Seaweed mariculture for purposes including fertilizer production, has the potential to improve environmental conditions in coastal habitats, especially with regards to toxic algal blooms, as mariculture seaweeds uptake excess nutrients that have resulted from runoff, thereby inhibiting the growth of toxic algal blooms that harm local ecosystems. Seaweed fertilizers can also be more biodegradable, less toxic, and less hazardous than chemical fertilizers, depending on the type of seaweed fertilizer.

Seaweeds are used in aquaculture operations to uptake fish waste as nutrients and improve water quality parameters. Humans use seaweeds nutritionally as food, industrially for animal feed and plant fertilizer, and ecologically to improve environmental conditions. Seaweeds have been consumed by humans for centuries because they have excellent nutritional profiles, contain minerals, trace elements, amino acids, and vitamins, and are high in fiber and low in calories. Red seaweeds have the highest protein content and brown seaweeds have the lowest protein content. Of all the red seaweeds, Porphyra, is the genus most frequently used for human consumption. Brown seaweeds are so plentiful that they most used for industrial animal feeds and fertilizers. Furthermore, seaweeds are currently being investigated as a potential source of sustainable biofuel, as well as being investigated as a potential component of wastewater treatment, because some species are able to absorb and remove heavy metals and other toxicants from water bodies, and also generally serve as water quality indicators.

=== Ecosystem impacts ===
Any ecosystem impacts of using seaweed for plant and crop fertilizer are primarily due to how the seaweed is harvested. Large-scale, unsustainable seaweed farming can lead to the displacement and alteration of native habitats due to the presence of farming infrastructure in the water, and day-to-day anthropogenic operations in the area. Seaweed is currently harvested from farmed sources, wild sources, and from beach collection efforts. Harvesting wild seaweed will tend to have negative impacts on local ecosystems, especially if existing populations are overexploited and rendered unable to provide ecosystem services. There is also a risk that large, industrial scale seaweed monocultures will be established in natural benthic environments, leading to the competitive exclusion of native seaweeds and sea grasses, which inhabit the depths underneath seaweed farms. Furthermore, large, industrial scale seaweed farming can alter the natural benthic environment that they are established in, by altering environmental parameters such as light availability, the movement of water, sedimentation rates and nutrient levels, and due to the general, overall stress caused by anthropogenic factors.

== Production and application methods ==
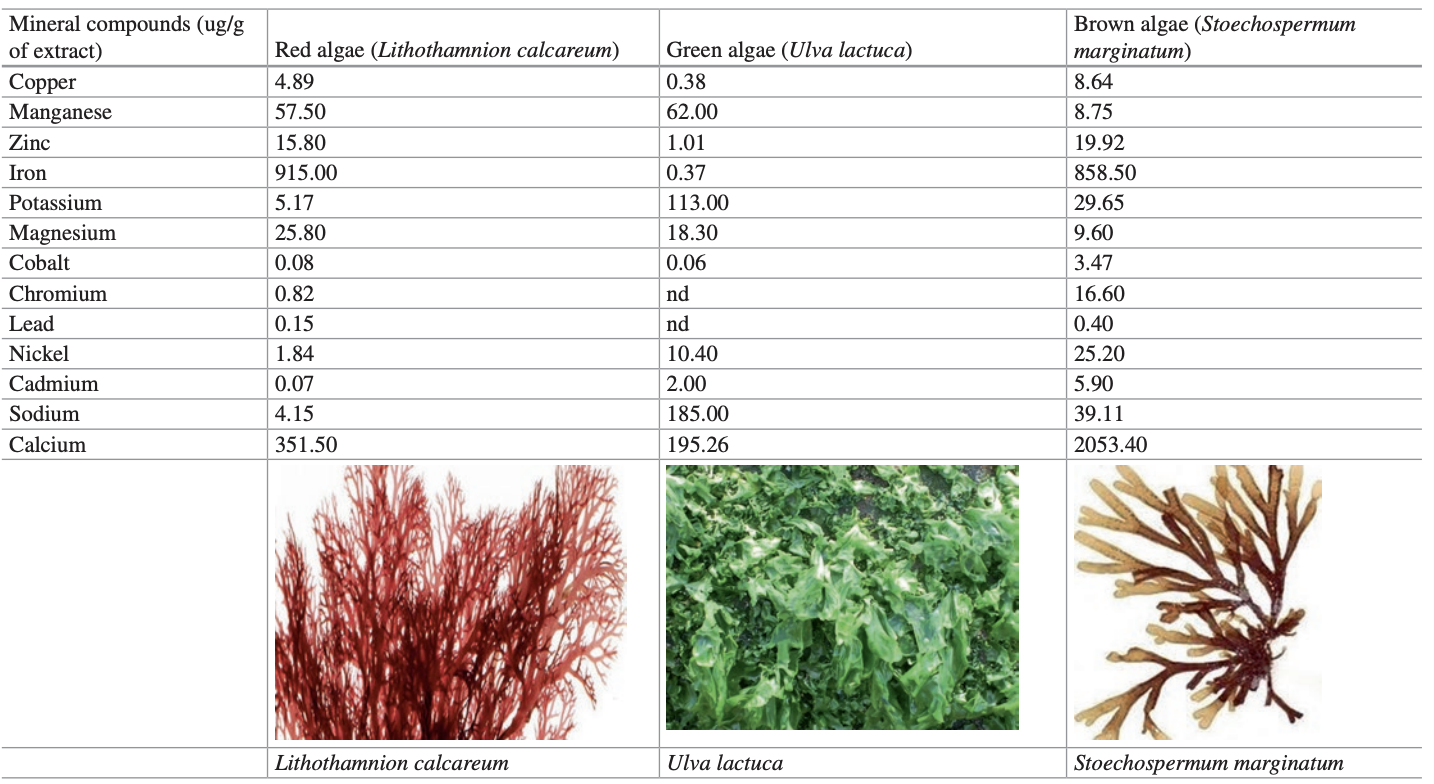
The composition of various minerals found in three different species of seaweed.

Brown seaweeds are most commonly used for fertilizer production, at present and historically. Seaweed fertilizer can be used as a crude addition to soil as mulch, composted to break down the hardy raw material, or dried and pulverized to make the nutrients more bioavailable to plant roots. Compost fertilization is a technique that any small-scale organic farm can readily use if they have access to seaweed, though extracts are more common for large-scale commercial applications. Commercial manufacturing processes are often more technical than traditional techniques using raw biomass and use different biochemical processes to concentrate and extract the most beneficial nutrients from seaweed.

A simple liquid fertilizer can be created by fermenting seaweed leaves in water, though the process is intensified and hastened industrially through heat and pressure. Other methods for liquid extraction include a soft-extraction with low temperature milling to suspend fine particles in water, heating the raw material with alkaline sodium or potassium to extract nutrients and the addition of enzymes to aid in biochemical decomposition.

Extraction of bioavailable nutrients from raw seaweed is achieved by breaking down the hardy cell walls through physical techniques, such as ultrasound extraction, boiling, or freeze-thaw. Biological fermentation techniques are also used to degrade the cells. Physical extraction techniques are often faster, but more expensive and result in poorer crop yield in trials. Since seaweed extract has chelating properties that maintain trace metal ions bioavailability to plants, additional micronutrients are often added to solution to increase the fertilization benefit to specific crops.

Organic fertilization techniques have lower environmental consequences in comparison to the production of artificial chemical fertilizers, because they use no harsh caustic or organic solvents to produce fertilizer and the seaweed raw material is a renewable resource, as opposed to mineral deposits and fossil fuels needed to synthesize chemical fertilizer.

Large-scale agricultural use of synthetic fertilizer depletes soil fertility and increases water hardness over time, so recent trends in agricultural development are following an organic approach to sustain food production through improved soil management and bio-fertilization techniques.

Seaweed extracts are bio-fertilizers that can also be used as biostimulants, which are applied to enhance nutrient efficiency and abiotic stress tolerance. New extraction technologies are being developed to improve efficiency and target the isolation of specific compounds for specialized applications of seaweed biostimulants, though specific extraction techniques are frequently trade secrets. Additionally, many liquid fertilizer extraction processes can complement other industrial uses for seaweed, such as carrageenan production, which increases the economic benefit of the same seaweed crop.

== Nutrient cycling ==
To support a growing seaweed aquaculture industry many studies have evaluated the nutrient cycle dynamics of different seaweed species in addition to exploring co-production applications including bioremediation and carbon sequestration. Seaweeds can form highly productive communities in coastal regions, dominating the nutrient cycles within these ecosystems. As primary producers, seaweeds incorporate inorganic carbon, light, and nutrients (such as nitrogen and phosphorus), into biomass through photosynthesis. Harvesting seaweed from marine environments results in the net removal of these elements from these ecosystems in addition to the removal of heavy metals and contaminants.

For photosynthesis, seaweeds utilize both inorganic nitrogen, in the forms of nitrate - NO_{3}^{−}, ammonium - NH_{4}^{+}, and organic nitrogen in the form of urea. Primary production using nitrate is generally considered new production because nitrate is externally supplied through upwelling and riverine input, and often has been converted from forms of nitrogen that are released from biological respiration. However, primary production using ammonium is denoted as recycled production because ammonium is internally supplied through regeneration by heterotrophs within ecosystems. For example, the ammonium excreted by fish and invertebrates within the same coastal ecosystems as seaweeds can support seaweed production through providing a nitrogen source.

Phosphorus is supplied inorganically as phosphate (PO_{4}^{3-}) and generally follows similar seasonal patterns to nitrate. In addition, seaweeds require inorganic carbon, typically supplied from the environment in the form of carbon dioxide (CO_{2}) or bicarbonate (HCO_{3}^{−}).

Similar to other marine photosynthesizing organisms like phytoplankton, seaweeds also experience nutrient limitations impacting their ability to grow. Nitrogen is the most commonly found limiting nutrient for seaweed photosynthesis, although phosphorus has also been found to be limiting. The ratio of inorganic carbon, nitrogen, and phosphorus is also important to ensure balanced growth. Generally the N:P ratio for seaweeds is 30:1, however, the ratio can differ significantly among species and requires experimental testing to identify the specific ratio for a given species. Exploring the relationship between nutrient cycling and seaweed growth is vital to optimizing seaweed aquaculture and understanding the functions and benefits of seaweed applications, including its use as a fertilizer, bio-remediator, and in the blue economy.

=== Coastal eutrophication ===
A growing population and intensification of industry and agriculture have increased the volume of wastewater discharged into coastal marine ecosystems. These waters typically contain high concentrations of nitrogen and phosphorus, and relatively high heavy metal concentrations, leading to eutrophication of many coastal ecosystems. Eutrophication results from the excessive nutrient load within these ecosystems resulting from the pollution of waters entering the oceans from industry, animal feed, and synthetic fertilizers, and thus over-fertilizes these systems.

Eutrophication leads to high productivity in coastal systems, which can result in coastal hypoxia and ocean acidification, two major concerns for coastal ecosystems. A notable service of seaweed farming is its ability to act as a bio-remediator through uptake and removal of the excessive nutrients in the coastal ecosystems with their application to land uses.

Brown algae, due in part to their large size, have been noted for their high productivity and corresponding high nutrient uptake in coastal ecosystems. Additionally, studies have focused on how brown algae growth can be optimized to increase biomass production and therefore increase the quantity of nutrients removed from these ecosystems. Studies have also explored the potential of brown algae to sequester large volumes of carbon (blue carbon).

=== Bio-remediation in eutrophic ecosystems ===
Seaweeds have received significant attention for their potential to mitigate eutrophication in coastal ecosystems through nutrient uptake during primary production in integrated multi-trophic aquaculture (IMTA). Bioremediation involves the use of biological organisms to lower the concentrations of nitrogen, phosphorus, and heavy metal concentrations in marine ecosystems. The bioremediation potential of seaweeds depends, in part, on their growth rate which is controlled by numerous factors including water movement, light, desiccation, temperature, salinity, life stage, and age class. It has also been proposed that in eutrophic ecosystems phosphorus can become limiting to seaweed growth due to the high N:P ratio of the wastewater entering these ecosystems. Bioremediation practices have been widely used due to their cost-effective ability to reduce excess nutrients in coastal ecosystems leading to a decrease in harmful algal blooms and an oxygenation of the water column. Seaweeds have also been studied for their potential use in the biosorption and accumulation of heavy metals in polluted waters, although the accumulation of heavy metals may impact algal growth.

=== Blue carbon ===
Blue carbon methods involve the use of marine ecosystems for carbon storage and burial. Seaweed aquaculture shows potential to act as a CO_{2} sink through the uptake of carbon during photosynthesis, transformation of inorganic carbon into biomass, and ultimately the fixation of carbon which can later be exported and buried. Duarte et al. (2017) outline a potential strategy for a seaweed farming blue carbon initiative. However the contribution of seaweed to blue carbon has faced controversy over the ability of seaweed to act as a net sink for atmospheric carbon. Krause-Jensen et al., (2018) discuss two main criteria for seaweed farming to be considered a blue carbon initiative: it must be both extensive in size and sequestration rate and possess the ability to be actionable by humans, that the sequestration rate can be managed by human action. Seaweed farming, including the use of seaweed as fertilizer could become an important contributor in climate mitigation strategies through carbon sequestration and storage.

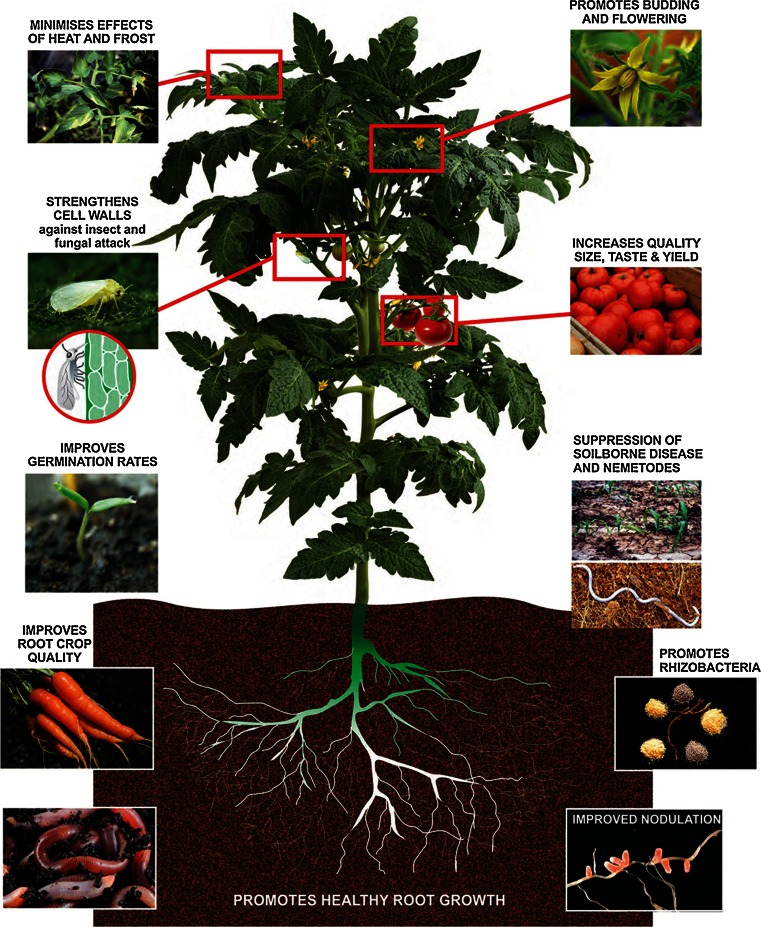
The positive impacts conferred by seaweed fertilizer on crops.

== Functions and benefits of seaweed fertilizer ==
=== Fertilization ===
Seaweed functions as an organic bio-fertilizer. Because seaweed is rich in micro and macronutrients, humic acids, and phytohormones, it enhances soil fertility. In addition, seaweed-derived fertilizers contain polysaccharides, proteins, and fatty acids which improve the moisture and nutrient retention of soil, contributing to improved crop growth. More trace minerals are found in seaweed than those produced with animal byproducts.

The application of seaweed fertilizers can also result in enhanced tolerance to abiotic stressors that generally inhibit crop growth and yield such as low moisture, high salinity, and freezing temperatures. These stress tolerance benefits appear to be driven by physiological changes induced in crops by the seaweed, including improved energy storage, enhanced root morphology, and greater metabolic potential, enhancing the plant's ability to survive unfavorable conditions. Kappaphycus alvarezzi extracts have also resulted in considerable reductions in the leakage of electrolytes, as well as enhanced chlorophyll and carotenoid production, and water content. Research has also demonstrated that wheat plants treated with seaweed extracts have accumulated key osmoprotectants such as proline, other amino acids, and total protein.

Foliar applications of seaweed fertilizer extract have been shown to improve the uptake of nitrogen, phosphorus, potassium, and sulfur in soybeans such as Glycine max. Research has also demonstrated that brown algae seaweed extracts can improve tomato plant growth, overall crop yield, and resistance to environmental stressors. Additional documented benefits of using seaweed as a fertilizer include reduced transplant shock, increased leaf surface area, and increased sugar content.

=== Soil conditioning ===
As a soil conditioner, seaweed fertilizer can improve the physical qualities of soil, such as aeration and water retention. Clay soils that lack organic matter and porosity benefit from the humic acid and soluble alginates found in seaweed. These compounds bond with metallic radicals which cause the clay particles to aggregate, thereby improving the texture, aeration, and retention of the soil by stimulating clay disaggregation. The degradation of alginates also supplements the soil with organic matter, enhancing its fertility.

In particular, brown seaweeds such as Sargassum are known to have valuable soil conditioning properties. This seaweed contains soluble alginates as well as alginic acid, which catalyzes the bacterial decomposition of organic matter. This process improves soil quality by enhancing populations of nitrogen-fixing bacteria and by supplementing the soil with additional conditioners through the waste products produced by these bacteria.

=== Bio-remediation of polluted soils ===
Seaweed functions as a bio-remediator through its adsorption of harmful pollutants. Functional groups on the algal surface such as ester, hydroxyl, carbonyl amino, sulfhydryl, and phosphate groups drive the biosorption of heavy metal ions.

Seaweeds such as Gracilaria corticata varcartecala and Grateloupia lithophila effectively remove a wide variety of heavy metals, including chromium (III) and (IV), mercury (II), lead (II), and cadmium (II) from their environment. In addition, Ulva spp. and Gelidium spp. have been shown to enhance the degradation of DDT in polluted soils and may reduce its bioavailability. Although there is significant potential for seaweed to serve as a bio-remediator for polluted soils, more research required to fully develop the mechanisms for this process in the context of the agriculture. Heavy metals accumulated by seaweed fertilizer may transfer to crops in some cases, causing significant implications for the public health.

The application of biochar is another strategy that can remediate and enhance infertile soils. Seaweed can be transformed into biochar and used as a means of increasing the organic matter and nutrient content of the soil. Different types of seaweed appear to yield unique nutrients and parameters; red seaweeds, for example, create biochar that is rich in potassium and sulfur and is more acidic than biochar generated from brown seaweeds. While this is a new field of research, current data shows that targeted breeding of seaweeds may result in biochars that can be tailored to different types of soil and crops.

=== Integrated pest management ===
The addition of seaweed to soil can increase crop health and resistance to diseases. Seaweeds contain a diverse array of bioactive molecules that can respond to diseases and pests, including steroids, terpenes, acetogenins, and amino acid-derived polymers. The application of seaweed extracts reduces the presence of harmful pests including nematodes and insects. While the application of seaweed seems to reduce the harmful effects of nematode infestation, the combination of seaweed application and carbofuran, a chemical nematocide, seems to be most effective. In addition, several species of seaweed appear to hinder the early growth and development of numerous detrimental insects, including Sargassum swartzii, Padina pavonica, and Caulerpa denticulata.

== Soil microbial response to seaweed fertilizer treatment ==
Shifts in bacterial and fungal communities, in response to seaweed fertilizer treatment, have only recently been studied. Soil Microbial community composition and functionality is largely driven by underlying soil health and abiotic properties.

Many DNA sequencing and omics-based approaches, combined with greenhouse experiments, have been used to characterize microbial responses to seaweed fertilizer treatment on a wide variety of crops. Deep 16S ribosomal RNA (rRNA) amplicon sequencing of the bacteria found in the soils of tomato plots, treated with a Sargassum horneri fermented seaweed fertilizer, showed a large shift in alpha diversity and beta diversity indices between untreated soils and soils after 60 days. This shift in community composition was correlated with a 1.48-1.83 times increase in tomato yield in treated soils. Though dominant bacterial phyla remained similar between treatment groups, changes in the abundance of the class, Bacilli and family, Micrococcaceae were noted. Enzyme assays also displayed an increase in protease, polyphenol oxidase, dehydrogenase, invertase, and urease activity, which was thought to be induced by microbial community alterations. Each of the microbial and enzymatic results listed above were noted to improve the nutrient turnover and quality in soils treated with fertilizer.

To investigate interactions between plant growth-promoting rhizobacteria (PGPR) and seaweed-derived extract, Ngoroyemoto et al. treated Amaranthus hybridus with both Kelpak and PGPR and measured impacts on plant growth. It was found that the treatment of plants with Kelpak® and the bacteria, Pseudomonas fluorescens and Bacillus licheniformis, decreased plant stress responses and increased production. The most recently mentioned study provides implications for crop benefits when the application of seaweed fertilizer to soils favors the growth of PGPR.

Wang et al. found that apple seedlings treated with seaweed fertilizer differed markedly in fungal diversity and species richness, when compared to no-treatment control groups. These findings were complemented by increases in soil quality and enzyme activities in treated soil groups, which supports the hypothesis that the fertilizer promoted the growth of plant-beneficial fungal species. With the use of 16S rRNA and fungal internal transcribed spacer (ITS) sequencing, Renaut et al. examined the effect of Ascophyllum nodosum extract treatment on the rhizospheres of pepper and tomato plants in greenhouses. This group found that bacterial and fungal species composition and community structures differed based on treatment. A rise of the abundance of certain amplicon sequence variants (ASVs) were also directly correlated with increases in plant health and growth. These ASVs included fungi in the family, Microascaceae, the genus, Mortierella spp., and several other uncultured ASVs. A large diversity of bacterial ASVs were identified to be positively correlated with growth in this same study, including Rhizobium, Sphingomonas, Sphingobium, and Bradyrhizobium.

=== Resistance to plant pathogens ===
Application of the seaweed fertilizer may also increase resistance to plant pathogens. In greenhouse samples, Ali et al. tested the treatment of Ascophyllum nodosum extract on tomato and sweet pepper crops and found that it both increased plant health and reduced the incidence of plant pathogens. Further investigation showed that the up-regulation of pathogen defense-related enzymes led to the reduction of the pathogens, Xanthomonas campestris pv. vesicatoria and Alternaria solani.

Chen et al. found that Ascophyllum nodosum treatment positively impacted the community composition of maize rhizospheres. This may have critical implications for plant health because the structure of rhizosphere microbial communities can aid in the resistance of plants to soil-borne pathogens.

Other pathogen reductions include the mitigation of carrot foliar fungal diseases following Ascophyllum nodosum treatment and inoculation with the fungal pathogens, Alternaria radicina and Botrytis cinerea. Reduced disease severity was noted at 10 and 20 days post-inoculation in comparison to control plants, and the seaweed treatment was found to be more effective at reducing disease pathology than salicylic acid, a known plant protector from biotic and abiotic stresses. Islam et al. had similar results when treating Arabidopsis thaliana with brown algal extracts, followed by inoculation with the fungal pathogen Phytophthora cinnamomi. This group analyzed plant RNA transcripts and found that the seaweed extract primed A. thaliana to defend against the fungal pathogen before its inoculation, which led to increased host survival and decreased susceptibility to infection.

Fewer studies have analyzed the impact of seaweed fertilizer treatment on plant resistance to viral pathogens, however limited auspicious results have been demonstrated. It has been shown that green, brown, and red seaweeds contain polysaccharides that elicit pathogen response pathways in plants, which primes defense against viruses, along with bacteria and fungi. Specifically, defense enzymes, including phenylalanine ammonia lyase and lipoxygenase, are activated and lead to viral defense.

Aqueous and ethanolic extracts from the brown alga, Durvillaea antarctica was shown to decrease pathological symptoms of tobacco mosaic virus (TMV) in tobacco leaves. Another study done on tobacco plants found that sulfated fucan oligosaccharides, extracted from brown algae, induced local and systemic acquired resistance to TMV. Based on the above results, it can be stated that the application of seaweed fertilizers has considerable potential to provide broad benefits to the agricultural crops and resistance to bacterial, fungal, and viral plant pathogens.
