= Biostimulant =

Material used to promote plant growth

Biostimulants also termed as plant conditioners or bioeffectors are substances, cultures of micro-organism, and mixtures of materials used to promote the growth of crop plants and can include natural or artificial plant growth regulators and biofertilizers. They do not include pesticides or fertilizers. The concept has been developed on the basis of the idea that plants are not isolated entities but grow within a complex ecosystem involving interactions with multiple organisms and that the strengths of these associations can be modified to enhance plant growth. The definitions vary but an attempted standard definition includes the statement that they are “a formulated product of biological origin that improves plant productivity as a consequence of the novel or emergent properties of the complex of constituents, and not as a sole consequence of the presence of known essential plant nutrients, plant growth regulators, or plant protective compounds.”

Although there are no widely accepted definitions of the term, around eight categories of constituents have been recognized in the literature which include:

- Humic substances
- Nitrogenous substances including amino acids
- Non-essential chemical elements
- Inorganic salts
- Seaweed extracts
- Chitin and chitosan derivatives
- Antitranspirants
- Other complex organic materials

A review commissioned by the Agriculture and Horticulture Development Board also included biological agents under the definition and defined four categories of these:

- Plant growth promoting bacteria and rhizobacteria
- Non-pathogenic fungi
- Arbuscular mycorrhizal fungi
- Non-pathogenic protozoa and nematodes
- Endophytic microbial consortia

Endophytic microbes are microorganisms that colonise plant tissues internally, forming closer associations with the host than rhizobacteria. Endophytic biostimulants based on registered microbial strains have demonstrated improvements in Nutrient Use Efficiency (NUE) and abiotic stress tolerance under field conditions.

== Regulation ==
As of 2016 due to there being no agreed definition of the term biostimulant, there were no specific frameworks for regulating their use in any country. The regulation of production and use of these materials varies from country to country with some treating them under their fertilizer legislations. As of 2016 in Europe, registration requirements differed substantially between countries with France, Italy and Hungary having relatively strict regulations which required evidence of efficacy and toxicity, Germany and Spain requiring only efficacy information and the UK requiring no efficacy or safety information.
