= Streptomyces coerulescens =

Scientific classification
- Domain: Bacteria
- Kingdom: Bacillati
- Phylum: Actinomycetota
- Class: Actinomycetia
- Order: Streptomycetales
- Family: Streptomycetaceae
- Genus: Streptomyces
- Species: S. coerulescens

Binomial name
- Streptomyces coerulescens (Preobrazhenskaya 1957) Pridham et al. 1958 (Approved Lists 1980)

Type strain
- AS 4.1597, ATCC 19742, ATCC 19896, BCC 5869, BCRC 11464, CBS 279.66, CBS 481.68, CCRC 11464, CGMCC 4.1597, DSM 40146, ETH 28426, Gause4562, IFO 12758, IMET 43578, INA 4562, ISP 5146, JCM 4360, KCC S-0360, KCCS-0360, LMG 8590, NBRC 12758, NCIB 9615, NCIMB 9615, NRRL B-2701, NRRL-ISP 5146, PCM 2312, PSA 168, RIA 1023, UNIQEM 129, VKM Ac-1843

Synonyms
- "Actinomyces coerulescens" Preobrazhenskaya 1957

Species of bacterium

Streptomyces coerulescens is a bacterium species from the genus of Streptomyces which has been isolated from soil. Streptomyces coerulescens produces gilvocarcin M, gilvocarcin V, coerulomycin and anantin.

== See also ==
- List of Streptomyces species
