= Azotobacter salinestris =

Scientific classification
- Domain: Bacteria
- Kingdom: Pseudomonadati
- Phylum: Pseudomonadota
- Class: Gammaproteobacteria
- Order: Pseudomonadales
- Family: Pseudomonadaceae
- Genus: Azotobacter
- Species: A. salinestris

Binomial name
- Azotobacter salinestris Page and Shivprasad, 1991

Species of bacterium

Azotobacter salinestris is a Gram-negative, nitrogen-fixing bacterium; its specific name, salinestris, comes from the Latin words salinus meaning saline and estris which means "living in". It can be found living in soil or marine habitats as single cells or in chains of six to eight cells. This organism is motile at younger stages, but loses its flagella at older stages. This species is known for its potential use in bioremediation.

== Isolation ==
William J. Page and Shailaja Shivprasad isolated A. salinestris from saline soils. The colonies used for their study were first taken from air-dried surface soil from Alberta, Canada. The soil was inoculated into a Burk nitrogen-free mineral-salt medium, which contained 1% glucose and 0.25 micrograms of copper(I) chloride per milliliter of solution. The medium was incubated at 30 °C and stored at 4 °C. Colony formation was noted after 2–3 days of incubation. The same soil samples were also used to inoculate slant cultures, which were stored at room temperature. A. salinestris was found to lose viability in the slant cultures when stored at 4 °C. Through these cultures and characterization tests, A. salinestris was found to share many of the general characteristics specific to the species Azotobacter. Originally, A. salinestris colonies were classified as Azotobacter chroococcum, but were later identified as a separate species based on their salt-dependent growth.

== Characteristics ==
=== Morphology ===
Azotobacter salinestris is a Gram-negative, rod-shaped organism. This organism's cells are about 2 x 4 μm in size when they are 18 hours old and can grow up to 5 μm in diameter. Older cells can also form cysts. A. salinestris colonies appear to be brown-black in color because they produce water-soluble catechol melanin.

=== Physiology ===
The bacteria that performed the most efficient atmospheric nitrogen fixation were from samples grown in 0.05% to 0.10% saline concentration soils. Nitrogen fixation rates were not affected by the presence of oxygen. A. salinestris that grows in soils is a facultative anaerobe. Colonies growing in aquatic habitats were determined to be microaerophilic and very sensitive to the presence of hydrogen peroxide since they do not produce a catalase enzyme.

=== Metabolism ===
A. salinestris can use melibiose, galactose, mannitol, sucrose, glucose, and fructose as primary carbon sources. They prefer to use sodium ions as their electron acceptor, but also use rubidium. Strains that do not have access to sodium ions produce acid as a product of the metabolism of their growth-promoting carbon substrate.

=== Ecology ===
All known A. salinestris samples were isolated from soils that had a neutral or slightly basic pH. The optimal growth pH of this species is 7.2–7.5. Soils must have at least one millimolar concentration of saline for this organism to grow. Unlike other Azotobacter species, iron was absolutely required for growth. While most Azotobacter species are commonly found in soil, A. salinestris is unique due to being found in soils with high salt content and requiring the presence of iron to grow. These organisms can survive in aerobic and anaerobic conditions. It is dependent on, so can also be found in marine environments.

A. chroococcum is the most common species from Azotobacter to be isolated from soil samples. It is also a close relative to A. salinestris. All growth conditions used to isolate and determine optimum living conditions for A. salinestris were based on the optimal living conditions for A. chroococcum. The defining factor between these two species was the dependence on sodium ions to live. A. salinestris displayed a stronger dependence on sodium to live than A. chroococcum.

== Genetics ==
While Page and Shivprasad are credited with the discovery and characterization of A. salinestris, Eydne and Wachter are credited with the sequencing of the bacterium’s 5S rRNA in 1987.

Although the results were never published, sequencing data placed this bacterial strain in the genus Azotobacter. The bacterium’s DNA has a melting point of 96.68 to 97.08 °C and the GC content was 67.73-67.8%. A separate sequencing of the 16S rRNA sequence, conducted by Moore et al. confirmed that A. salinestris was indeed a separate species of that genus.

== Importance ==
A. salinestris was the first prokaryote to show Na^{+}/succinic acid efflux. It can tolerate up to 5% glyphosate, which is a pesticide used to kill weeds that compete with crops. Because the species is a common nitrogen fixer, it is important to the agricultural industry for the species to be able to survive in the presence of such a common pesticide. It can degrade endosulfan, which is an insecticide that is highly hazardous to human, mammal, and fish health. Endosulfan use was banned in 2012 by the United States, following a precedent established by New Zealand and the European Union. The decision to ban endosulfan use came after a study that showed the health risks to humans and wildlife were much higher than expected. It is similar to dichlorodiphenyltrichloroethane, causes birth defects, and is an estrogen analog. Therefore, the ability of A. salinestris to break down endosulfan is important for bioremediation to the environments where the substance was used.

== See also ==
- Prokaryote
