= AMP nucleosidase =

Enzyme

Identifiers
- EC no.: 3.2.2.4
- CAS no.: 9025-45-0

Databases
- BRENDA: enzyme data
- ExPASy: NiceZyme view
- KEGG: enzyme entry
- MetaCyc: metabolic pathway
- Rhea: reactions
- PDB structures: RCSB PDB PDBe PDBsum
- Gene Ontology: AmiGO / QuickGO
Search
- PMC: articles
- PubMed: articles
- NCBI: proteins

AMP nucleosidase (EC 3.2.2.4) is an enzyme that catalyzes the chemical reaction

adenosine monophosphate
H_{2}O
D-ribose 5-phosphate
+
adenine

The enzyme characterised from Azotobacter vinelandiil and Escherichia coli hydrolyses the pyrimidine nucleotide, adenosine monophosphate, to D-ribose 5-phosphate and adenine. The enzyme has been used in a systems engineering approach to the industrial production of purines.

This enzyme is a hydrolase, specifically a glycosylase that hydrolyses N-glycosyl compounds. he systematic name of this enzyme class is AMP phosphoribohydrolase. Other names in common use include adenylate nucleosidase, and adenosine monophosphate nucleosidase.

== Structural studies ==
As of late 2007, 5 structures have been solved for this class of enzymes, with PDB accession codes PDB: 1T8R, PDB: 1T8S, PDB: 1T8W, PDB: 1T8Y, and PDB: 2GUW.
