= Fortieaceae =

Scientific classification
- Domain: Bacteria
- Phylum: Cyanobacteria
- Class: Cyanophyceae
- Order: Nostocales
- Family: Fortieaceae

Genera
- Aulosira Kirchner ex Bornet & Flahault 1886; Calochaete Hauer et al. 2013; Coleospermum Kirchner in Cohn 1878; Fortiea De-Toni 1936; Roholtiella Bohunická et al. 2015

Family of bacteria

The Fortieaceae is a family of cyanobacteria.
