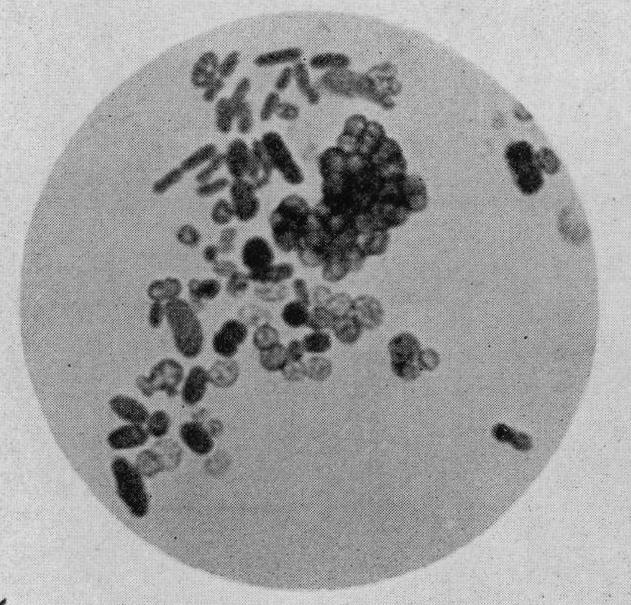
- Azotobacter species cells, stained with Heidenhain's iron hematoxylin, ×1000

Scientific classification
- Domain: Bacteria
- Kingdom: Pseudomonadati
- Phylum: Pseudomonadota
- Class: Gammaproteobacteria
- Order: Pseudomonadales
- Family: Pseudomonadaceae
- Genus: Azotobacter; Beijerinck 1901

Species
- Azotobacter agilis Azotobacter armeniacus Azotobacter beijerinckii Azotobacter chroococcum Azotobacter nigricans Azotobacter salinestris Azotobacter tropicalis Azotobacter vinelandii

= Azotobacter =

Genus of bacteria

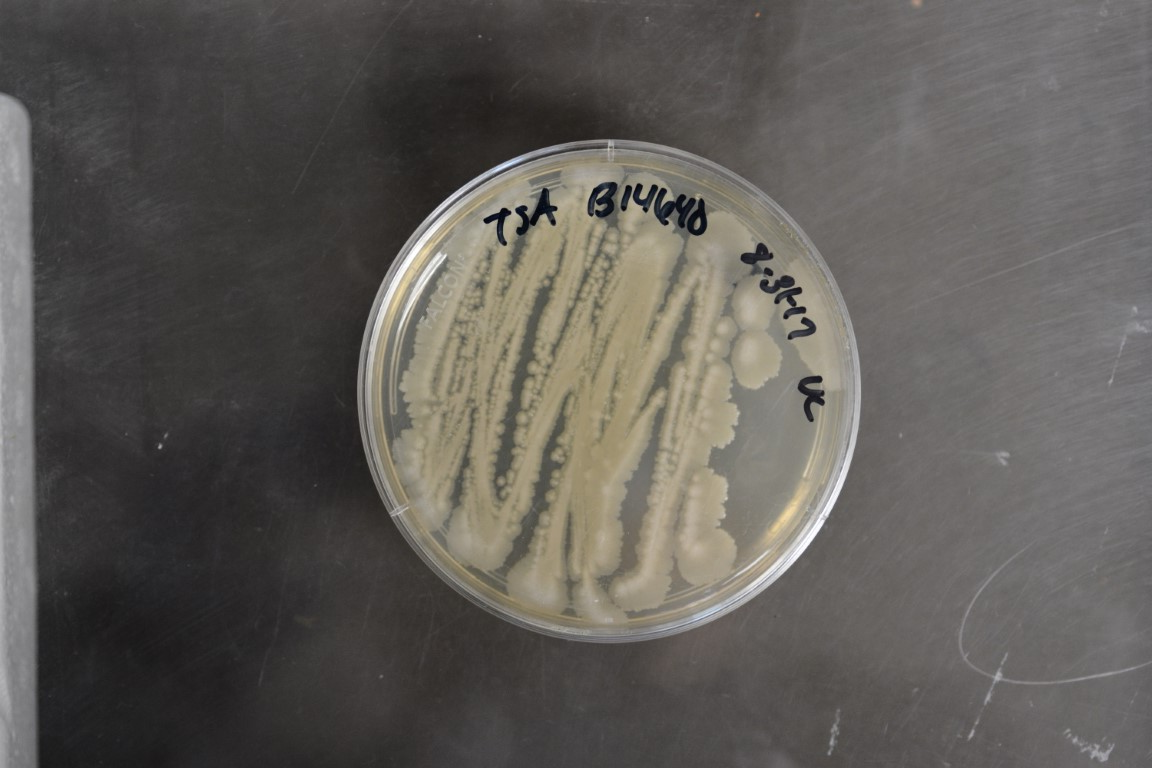
Azotobacter beijerinckii on agar plate

Azotobacter is a genus of usually motile, oval or spherical bacteria that form thick-walled cysts (and also has hard crust) and may produce large quantities of capsular slime. They are aerobic, free-living soil microbes that play an important role in the nitrogen cycle in nature, binding atmospheric nitrogen, which is inaccessible to plants, and releasing it in the form of ammonium ions into the soil (nitrogen fixation). In addition to being a model organism for studying diazotrophs, it is used by humans for the production of biofertilizers, food additives, and some biopolymers. The first representative of the genus, Azotobacter chroococcum, was discovered and described in 1901 by Dutch microbiologist and botanist Martinus Beijerinck. Azotobacter species are Gram-negative bacteria found in neutral and alkaline soils, in water, and in association with some plants.

== Biological characteristics ==
=== Morphology ===
Cells of the genus Azotobacter are relatively large for bacteria (2–4 μm in diameter). They are usually oval but may take various forms from rods to spheres. In microscopic preparations, the cells can be dispersed or form irregular clusters or, occasionally, chains of varying lengths. In fresh cultures, cells are mobile due to the numerous flagella. Later, the cells lose their mobility, become almost spherical, and produce a thick layer of mucus, forming the cell capsule. The shape of the cell is affected by the amino acid glycine, which is present in the nutrient medium peptone.

Under magnification, the cells show inclusions, some of which are colored. In the early 1900s, the colored inclusions were regarded as "reproductive grains", or gonidia – a kind of embryo cells. However, the granules were later determined to not participate in the cell division. The colored grains are composed of volutin, whereas the colorless inclusions are drops of fat, which act as energy reserves.

==== Cysts ====
Cysts of the genus Azotobacter are more resistant to adverse environmental factors than the vegetative cells; in particular, they are twice as resistant to ultraviolet light. They are also resistant to drying, ultrasound, and gamma and solar irradiation, but not to heating.

The formation of cysts is induced by changes in the concentration of nutrients in the medium and the addition of some organic substances such as ethanol, n-butanol, or β-hydroxybutyrate. Cysts are rarely formed in liquid media. The formation of cysts is induced by chemical factors and is accompanied by metabolic shifts, changes in catabolism, respiration, and biosynthesis of macromolecules; it is also affected by aldehyde dehydrogenase and the response regulator AlgR.

The cysts of Azotobacter are spherical and consist of the so-called "central body" – a reduced copy of vegetative cells with several vacuoles – and the "two-layer shell". The inner part of the shell is called intine and has a fibrous structure. The outer part has a hexagonal crystalline structure and is called exine. Exine is partially hydrolyzed by trypsin and is resistant to lysozyme, in contrast to the central body. The central body can be isolated in a viable state by some chelation agents. The main constituents of the outer shell are alkylresorcinols composed of long aliphatic chains and aromatic rings. Alkylresorcinols are also found in other bacteria, animals, and plants.

==== Germination of cysts ====
A cyst of the genus Azotobacter is the resting form of a vegetative cell; however, whereas usual vegetative cells are reproductive, the cyst of Azotobacter does not serve this purpose and is necessary for surviving adverse environmental factors. When more favorable environmental conditions resume, which includes a certain value of pH, temperature, and source of carbon, the cysts germinate, and the newly formed vegetative cells multiply by a simple division. During the germination, the cysts sustain damage and release a large vegetative cell. Microscopically, the first manifestation of spore germination is the gradual decrease in light refractive by cysts, which is detected with phase contrast microscopy. Germination of cysts takes about 4–6 hours. During germination, the central body grows and captures the granules of volutin, which are located in the intima (the innermost layer). Then, the exine bursts and the vegetative cell is freed from the exine, which has a characteristic horseshoe shape. This process is accompanied by metabolic changes. Immediately after being supplied with a carbon source, the cysts begin to absorb oxygen and emit carbon dioxide; the rate of this process gradually increases and saturates after four hours. The synthesis of proteins and RNA occurs in parallel, but it intensifies only after five hours after the addition of the carbon source. The synthesis of DNA and nitrogen fixation are initiated 5 hours after the addition of glucose to a nitrogen-free nutrient medium.

Germination of cysts is accompanied by changes in the intima, visible with an electron microscope. The intima consists of carbohydrates, lipids, and proteins and has almost the same volume as the central body. During germination of cysts, the intima undergoes hydrolysis and is used by the cell for the synthesis of its components.

=== Physiological properties ===
Azotobacter respires aerobically, receives energy from redox reactions, using organic compounds as electron donors, and can use a variety of carbohydrates, alcohols, and salts of organic acids as sources of carbon.

Azotobacter can fix at least 10 μg of nitrogen per gram of glucose consumed. Nitrogen fixation requires molybdenum ions, but they can be partially or completely replaced by vanadium ions. If atmospheric nitrogen is not fixed, the source of nitrogen can alternatively be nitrates, ammonium ions, or amino acids. The optimal pH for the growth and nitrogen fixation is 7.0–7.5, but growth is sustained in the pH range from 4.8 to 8.5. Azotobacter can also grow mixotrophically, in a molecular nitrogen-free medium containing mannose; this growth mode is hydrogen-dependent. Hydrogen is available in the soil, thus this growth mode may occur in nature.

While growing, Azotobacter produces flat, slimy, paste-like colonies with a diameter of 5–10 mm, which may form films in liquid nutrient media. The colonies can be dark-brown, green, or other colors, or may be colorless, depending on the species. The growth is favored at a temperature of 20–30°C.

Bacteria of the genus Azotobacter are also known to form intracellular inclusions of polyhydroxyalkanoates under certain environmental conditions (e.g. lack of elements such as phosphorus, nitrogen, or oxygen combined with an excessive supply of carbon sources).

=== Pigments ===
Azotobacter produces pigments. For example, Azotobacter chroococcum forms a dark-brown water-soluble pigment melanin. This process occurs at high levels of metabolism during the fixation of nitrogen and is thought to protect the nitrogenase system from oxygen. Other Azotobacter species produce pigments from yellow-green to purple colors, including a green pigment which fluoresces with a yellow-green light and a pigment with blue-white fluorescence.

=== Genome ===
The nucleotide sequence of chromosomes of Azotobacter vinelandii, strain AvOP, is partially determined. This chromosome is a circular DNA molecule which contains 5,342,073 nucleotide pairs and 5,043 genes, of which 4,988 encode proteins. The fraction of guanine + cytosine pairs is 65 mole percent. The number of chromosomes in the cells and the DNA content increases upon aging, and in the stationary growth phase, cultures may contain more than 100 copies of a chromosome per cell. The original DNA content (one copy) is restored when replanting the culture into a fresh medium. In addition to chromosomal DNA, Azotobacter can contain plasmids.

== Distribution ==
Azotobacter species are ubiquitous in neutral and weakly basic soils, but not acidic soils. They are also found in the Arctic and Antarctic soils, despite the cold climate, short growing season, and relatively low pH values of these soils. In dry soils, Azotobacter can survive in the form of cysts for up to 24 years.

Representatives of the genus Azotobacter are also found in aquatic habitats, including fresh water and brackish marshes. Several members are associated with plants and are found in the rhizosphere, having certain relationships with the plants. Some strains are also found in the cocoons of the earthworm Eisenia fetida.

== Nitrogen fixation ==
Azotobacter species are free-living, nitrogen-fixing bacteria; in contrast to Rhizobium species, they normally fix molecular nitrogen from the atmosphere without symbiotic relations with plants, although some Azotobacter species are associated with plants. Nitrogen fixation is inhibited in the presence of available nitrogen sources, such as ammonium ions and nitrates.

Azotobacter species have a full range of enzymes needed to perform nitrogen fixation: ferredoxin, hydrogenase, and an important enzyme nitrogenase. The process of nitrogen fixation requires an influx of energy in the form of adenosine triphosphate. Nitrogen fixation is highly sensitive to the presence of oxygen, so Azotobacter developed a special defensive mechanism against oxygen, namely a significant intensification of metabolism that reduces the concentration of oxygen in the cells. Also, a special nitrogenase-protective protein protects nitrogenase and is involved in protecting the cells from oxygen. Mutants not producing this protein are killed by oxygen during nitrogen fixation in the absence of a nitrogen source in the medium. Homocitrate ions play a certain role in the processes of nitrogen fixation by Azotobacter.

=== Nitrogenase ===
Nitrogenase is the most important enzyme involved in nitrogen fixation. Azotobacter species have several types of nitrogenase. The basic one is molybdenum-iron nitrogenase. An alternative type contains vanadium; it is independent of molybdenum ions and is more active than the Mo-Fe nitrogenase at low temperatures. So it can fix nitrogen at temperatures as low as 5 °C and its low-temperature activity is 10 times higher than that of Mo-Fe nitrogenase. An important role in maturation of Mo-Fe nitrogenase plays the so-called P-cluster. Synthesis of nitrogenase is controlled by the nif genes. Nitrogen fixation is regulated by the enhancer protein NifA and the "sensor" flavoprotein NifL which modulates the activation of gene transcription of nitrogen fixation by redox-dependent switching. This regulatory mechanism, relying on two proteins forming complexes with each other, is uncommon for other systems.

== Importance ==
Nitrogen fixation plays an important role in the nitrogen cycle. Azotobacter also synthesizes some biologically active substances, including some phytohormones such as auxins, thereby stimulating plant growth. They also facilitate the mobility of heavy metals in the soil, thus enhancing bioremediation of soil from heavy metals, such as cadmium, mercury and lead. Some kinds of Azotobacter can also biodegrade chlorine-containing aromatic compounds, such as 2,4,6-trichlorophenol, which was previously used as an insecticide, fungicide, and herbicide, but later was found to have mutagenic and carcinogenic effects.

== Applications ==
Owing to their ability to fix molecular nitrogen and therefore increase the soil fertility and stimulate plant growth, Azotobacter species are widely used in agriculture, particularly in nitrogen biofertilizers such as azotobacterin. They are also used in production of alginic acid, which is applied in medicine as an antacid, in the food industry as an additive to ice cream, puddings, and creams.

== Taxonomy ==
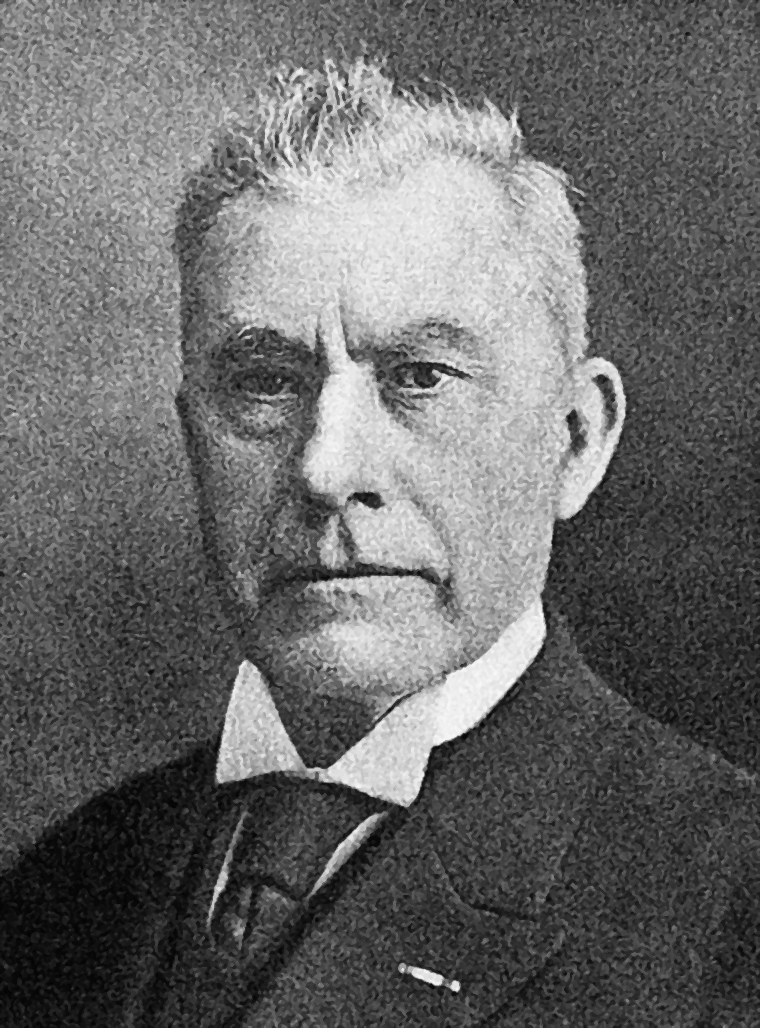
Martinus Beijerinck (1851–1931), discoverer of the genus Azotobacter

The genus Azotobacter was discovered in 1901 by Dutch microbiologist and botanist Martinus Beijerinck, who was one of the founders of environmental microbiology. He selected and described the species Azotobacter chroococcum – the first aerobic, free-living nitrogen fixer.

In 1909, Lipman described Azotobacter vinelandii, and a year later Azotobacter beijerinckii, which he named in honor of Beijerinck. In 1949, Russian microbiologist Nikolai Krasilnikov identified the species of Azotobacter nigricans which was divided in 1981 by Thompson Skerman into two subspecies – Azotobacter nigricans subsp. nigricans and Azotobacter nigricans subsp. achromogenes; in the same year, Thompson and Skerman described Azotobacter armeniacus. In 1991, Page and Shivprasad reported a microaerophilic and air-tolerant type Azotobacter salinestris which was dependent on sodium ions.

Earlier, representatives of the genus were assigned to the family Azotobacteraceae Pribram, 1933, but then were transferred to the family Pseudomonadaceae based on the studies of nucleotide sequences 16S rRNA. In 2004, a phylogenetic study revealed that A. vinelandii belongs to the same clade as the bacterium Pseudomonas aeruginosa, and in 2007 it was suggested that the genera Azotobacter, Azomonas and Pseudomonas are related and might be synonyms.
