= Gilvocarcin V =

Names
- IUPAC name 4-[3,4-Dihydroxy-5-(1-hydroxyethyl)oxolan-2-yl]-8-ethenyl-1-hydroxy-10,12-dimethoxynaphtho[1,2-c]isochromen-6-one
- Other names NSC348115, Anandimycin A, Toromycin B, Antibiotic 1072B

Identifiers
CAS Number	77879-90-4
3D model (JSmol)	Interactive image
ChemSpider	296213
PubChem CID	334288
CompTox Dashboard (EPA)	DTXSID80999069
- InChI: InChI=1S/C27H26O9/c1-5-12-8-15-19(17(9-12)33-3)14-10-18(34-4)21-16(29)7-6-13(20(21)25(14)36-27(15)32)26-23(31)22(30)24(35-26)11(2)28/h5-11,22-24,26,28-31H,1H2,2-4H3 Key: XCWHINLKQMCRON-UHFFFAOYSA-N
- SMILES: O(C)C1=C2C(=C3C(C=4C(C(=O)O3)=CC(C=C)=CC4OC)=C1)C(=CC=C2O)[C@H]5O[C@@]([C@@H](C)O)([C@H](O)[C@H]5O)[H]

Properties
Chemical formula	C_{27}H_{26}O_{9}
Molar mass	494.496 g·mol^{−1}
- Except where otherwise noted, data are given for materials in their standard state (at 25 °C [77 °F], 100 kPa). Infobox references

Gilvocarcin V is an antitumor agent and an antibiotic which is active against Gram-positive bacteria with the molecular formula C_{27}H_{26}O_{9}. Gilvocarcin V is produced by the bacterium Streptomyces griseoflavus and other Streptomyces bacteria. Gilvocarcin V is a strong inhibitor of the DNA synthesis.
