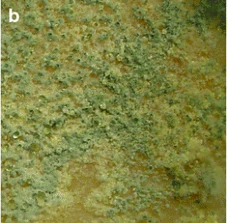

Scientific classification
- Kingdom: Fungi
- Division: Ascomycota
- Class: Sordariomycetes
- Order: Hypocreales
- Family: Hypocreaceae
- Genus: Trichoderma
- Species: T. atroviride

Binomial name
- Trichoderma atroviride Bidr. Känn. Finl. Nat. Folk 51: 363. (1892)

Synonyms
- Trichoderma parceramosum Trichoderma todica

= Trichoderma atroviride =

Species of fungus

Trichoderma atroviride is a filamentous fungal species commonly found in the soil. This fungal species is of particular interest to researchers due to the plethora of secondary metabolites it makes which are used in industry. The genus Trichoderma is known for its ubiquity in almost all soils and being easy to culture. Many Trichoderma's are also avirulent plant symbionts.

== Taxonomy ==
This organism has had its DNA sequenced and uploaded to the NCBI database. An abbreviated taxonomic description is as follows: Eukaryota; Fungi; Dikarya; Ascomycota; Pezizomycotina; Sordariomycetes; Hypocreomycetidae; Hypocreales; Hypocreaceae; Trichoderma. The full taxonomic order can be found on the NCBI website. The first description of the genus Trichoderma dates back to 1794, but individual species were not specified, and it was not until 1969 that a framework for identifying Trichoderma species was established. Trichoderma atroviride also has several synonyms and older names which can be found in the species box.

== Description ==
Images of T. atroviride growing on plates show green fruiting bodies and light-responsive conidiation. In these pictures they can also be seen growing in concentric circle zones on the face of the agar (see species box image). Trichoderma species are ubiquitously described as having long filamentous hyphae and the ability to germinate on many different substrates. When the fungus grows it starts off as white, but then becomes various shades of green. Conidiophores are generally irregular in shape and number of conidia release and are also photosensitive and release when exposed to light. Finally, Trichoderma are known for their fast growth rates, and ability to colonize most substrates.

== Habitat and ecology ==
Trichoderma atroviride are fairly ubiquitous organisms, they are found in soils in both tropical and temperate locations around the world. This fungus is found on every continent, and is commonly found in Europe, North and South America and Australia (see range map). T. atroviride is a mycoparasite saprophyte, meaning it parasitizes other fungi and it obtains its food by absorbing dissolved organic matter. T. atroviride are found in many substrates including decaying wood, and fungal fruiting bodies, and are known to be able to use a wide range of substrates for carbon and nitrogen sources. Finally, T. atroviride has a wide temperature survival range from -1 to 35°C.

== Relevance to humans ==
Trichoderma atroviride has many uses that make them relevant to humans. They are used as natural biocontrol agents for both insects and other fungi, they can take up heavy metal pollutants, and they are used as model organisms to better understand the genetic control of light dependent mechanisms.

=== Fungicide ===
Insects and pathogenic fungi are significant threats to agriculture around the world. Unfortunately, synthetic pesticides and fungicides can be bad for the environment and are often not very effective long term due to evolution. T. atroviride is a mycoparasite, and thus an effective organism to help deal with fungal plant pathogens. Specifically, T. atroviride can compete for nutrients and produce fungi cell wall degrading enzymes to kill its host fungus. Furthermore, researchers have been experimenting with T. atroviride genome to get it to express even more aggressive fungicide agents. Additionally, T. atroviride are currently being explored as a method to defend crops against insects due to their ability to produce natural insecticides which they protect themselves with, so they are not eaten.

=== Bioremediation ===
Pollutants due to industry are a huge environmental problem that is very expensive to remedy. Recently, it has been found that T. atroviride has the capacity to take up some of these heavy metals. This has been observed in vitro in a wastewater treatment plant, and in research setting on a petri plate. This type of bioremediation could be instrumental to solving heavy metal pollution crises.

=== Genetic model ===
Understanding biological circadian clocks has always been important to learn about how organisms respond to stimuli. A good model organism for this research is one that has a clear relationship to an abiotic stimulus that's easy to replicate and has an easily manipulable genome. T. atroviride fills both of those requirements, as it releases spores in response to light, and has a conserved genome that can be edited with known genetic tools. This has allowed T. atroviride to be an instrumental model organism in research that aims to understand how organisms respond to stimuli.
