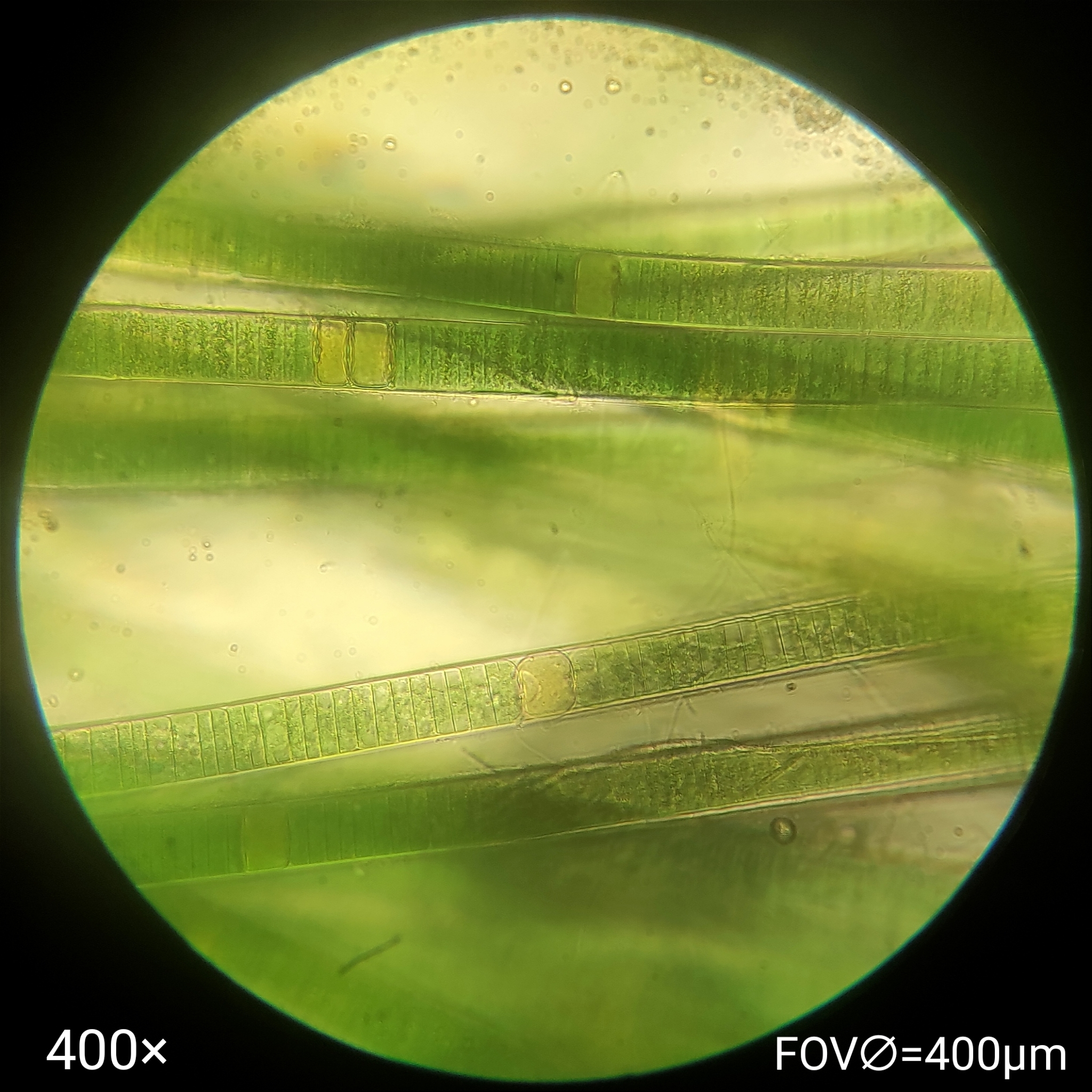

Scientific classification
- Domain: Bacteria
- Phylum: Cyanobacteria
- Class: Cyanophyceae
- Order: Nostocales
- Family: Fortieaceae
- Genus: Aulosira; Kirchner ex Bornet & Flahault, 1886

Species
- A. bohemensis A. aenigmatica Frémy U A. africana Frémy C A. bohemensis Lukesová, Johansen, Martin & Casamatta C A. bombayensis Gonzalves U A. confluens C.-C.Jao C A. fertilissima Ghose C A. fertilissima var. tenuis C.B.Rao U A. fritschii Bharadwaja U A. godoyana P.González C A. implexa Bornet & Flahault C A. laxa O.Kirchner ex Bornet & Flahault C - type A. planctonica Elenkin C A. prolifica Bharadwaja U A. pseudoramosa Bharadwaja U A. schauinslandii Lemmermann C A. striata Woronichin U A. terrestris U A. thermalis G.S.West S

= Aulosira =

Genus of bacteria

Aulosira is a genus of cyanobacteria found in a variety of environmental niches that forms colonies composed of filaments of moniliform cells.

The name "Aulosira" was invented by biologists.

Species of Aulosira can be found in soil, on moist rocks, at the bottom of lakes and springs (both fresh- and saltwater), and rarely in marine habitats. It may also grow symbiotically within the tissues of plants, such as the evolutionarily ancient (Gunnera) or hornworts, providing nitrogen to its host through the action of terminally differentiated cells known as heterocysts. These bacteria contain photosynthetic pigments in their cytoplasm to perform photosynthesis.
