= Azotobacter chroococcum =

Scientific classification
- Domain: Bacteria
- Kingdom: Pseudomonadati
- Phylum: Pseudomonadota
- Class: Gammaproteobacteria
- Order: Pseudomonadales
- Family: Pseudomonadaceae
- Genus: Azotobacter
- Species: A. chroococcum

Binomial name
- Azotobacter chroococcum Beijerinck 1901

Species of bacterium

Azotobacter chroococcum is a bacterium that has the ability to fix atmospheric nitrogen. It was discovered by Martinus Beijerinck in 1901, and was the first aerobic, free-living nitrogen fixer discovered. A. chroococcum could be useful for nitrogen fixation in crops as a biofertilizer, fungicide, and nutrient indicator, and in bioremediation.

== Characteristics ==
Azotobacter chroococcum is a microaerophilic plant growth-promoting rhizobacterium (PGRP), which is bacillus in shape and is Gram negative. As a mesophile, this bacterium grows best in moderate-temperature soils and requires a neutral pH environment. It is able to fix nitrogen under aerobic conditions. The soil cannot be poor in phosphorus or else nitrogen fixing can be hindered. In addition to phosphorus, these bacteria needed potassium, "sulphur, magnesium, and calcium" to grow. To fix nitrogen A. chroococcum produces three enzymes (catalase, peroxidase, and superoxide dismutase) to "neutralise" reactive oxygen species. It also forms the dark-brown, water-soluble pigment melanin at high levels of metabolism during the fixation of nitrogen, which is thought to protect the nitrogenase system from oxygen. In the presence of some saccharides (such as sucrose and raffinose) while on agar plates, a levan ring can form around the A. chroococcum colony.

== Uses ==
Research has been carried out into A. chroococcum's potential applications in improving crop production. At least one study has so far shown a significant increase in crop production linked to the production of "auxins, cytokinins, and GA–like substances" by A. chroococcum. In addition to these biomolecules, this bacterium has been found to be able to produce "siderophores, ammonia, and ACC deaminase", as well as indoleacetic acid, which all are known to assist with the growth of crops.

On top of helping with the growth of crops in general, A. chroococcum has also been shown to help crops grow in polluted soils. A. chroococcum is able to survive and improve the growth of crops in soils polluted with heavy metals when seeds are inoculated with the bacterium prior to planting. A. chroococcum not only produced growth-positive biomolecules and increased the number and quality of maize kernels, but also reduced the production of "proline, antioxidant enzymes, and MDA" in the plants, all which indicate of the presence of heavy metals in the soil.

In addition to treating soils polluted with heavy metals, A. chroococcum can act as a fungicide that can be used to treat soils and plants inflicted with fungal infections, specifically fungi that are susceptible to "fungicidal substances of the anisomycin group".

This bacterium can also be used to determine the nutrient composition of the soil. Since plants and A.chroccoccum both need phosphorus and potassium to grow, this bacterium can be used to determine if the soil is fit for crop growth, as it would thrive in soils that have these nutrients.

Azotobacter chroococcum is also a possible asset for bioremediation. Melanin produced by this bacterium can bind to heavy metals, subsequently protecting A. chroococcum, which may be useful for removing heavy metals from polluted soils. Since this bacterium is able promote plant growth through nitrogen fixation, it can also reduce the amount of nitrogen that has to be added to fields, which can reduce the amount of nitrogen runoff. This effect of less nitrogen being added in soil was seen in a study involving cotton plants.
