= Streptomyces griseoflavus =

Scientific classification
- Domain: Bacteria
- Kingdom: Bacillati
- Phylum: Actinomycetota
- Class: Actinomycetes
- Order: Streptomycetales
- Family: Streptomycetaceae
- Genus: Streptomyces
- Species: S. griseoflavus

Binomial name
- Streptomyces griseoflavus (Krainsky 1914) Waksman and Henrici 1948 (Approved Lists 1980)

Type strain
- A28Nr.118, AS 4.1454, ATCC 25456, BCRC 12232, Bu 7,13, CBS 409.52, CBS 689.69, CCRC 12232, CGMCC 4.1454, DSM 40456, ETH 10249, IFO 12372, IFO 13044, IMET 43530, ISP 5456, JCM 4479, KCC S-0479, KCTC 19070, Lanoot R-8708, LMG 19344, NBRC 12372, NBRC 13044, NRRL B-5312, NRRL-ISP 5456, R-8708, RIA 1236, VKM Ac-993

Synonyms
- "Actinomyces griseoflavus" Krainsky 1914

Species of bacterium

Streptomyces griseoflavus is a bacterium species from the genus of Streptomyces which has been isolated from garden soil. Streptomyces griseoflavus produces bicozamycin, colabomycins A, colabomycins C, germacradienol and hormaomycin.

== See also ==
- List of Streptomyces species
