= Rhizobacteria =

Group of bacteria affecting plant growth

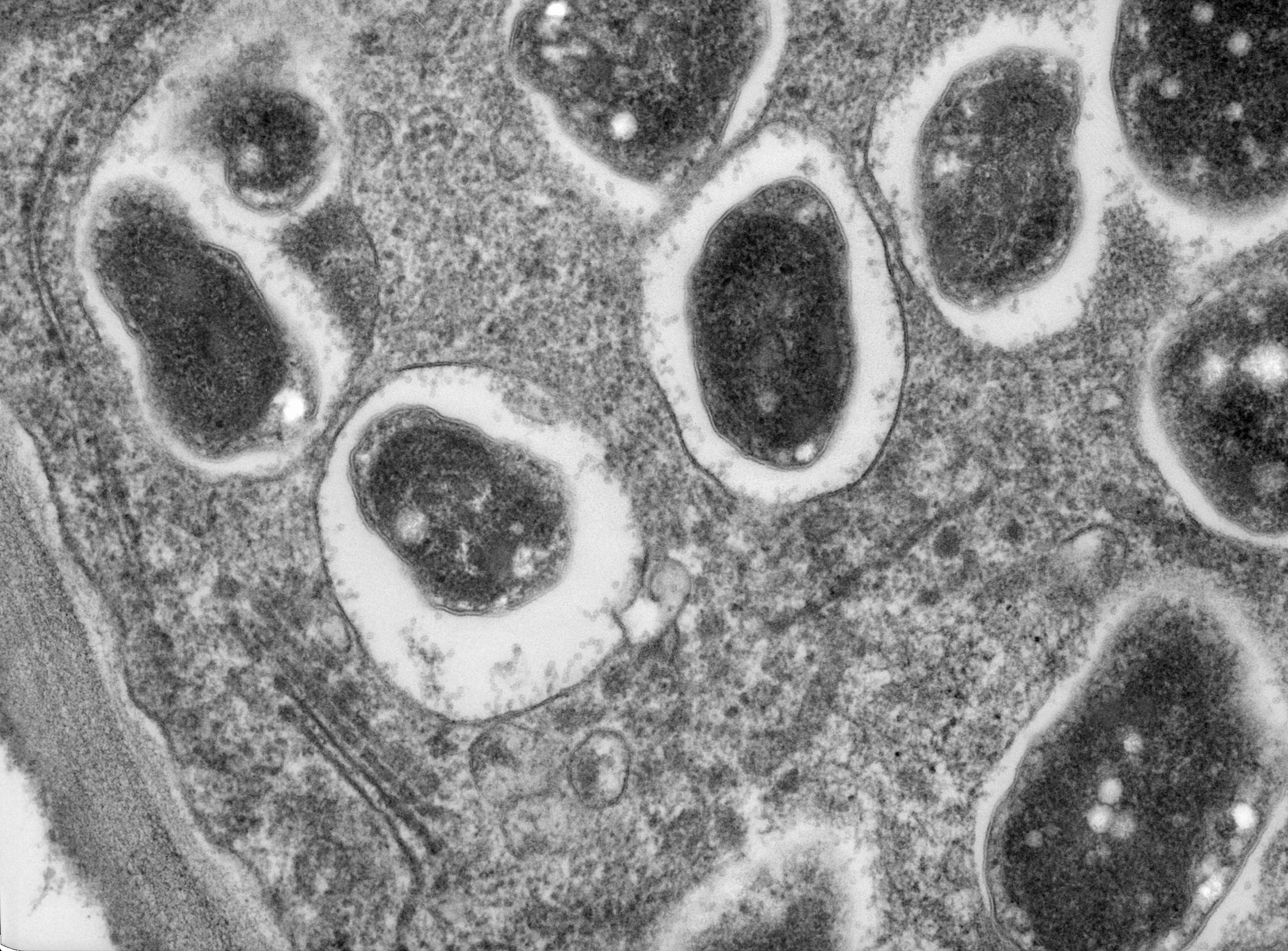
Cross section though a soybean (Glycine max 'Essex') root nodule: The rhizobacteria, Bradyrhizobium japonicum, colonizes the roots and establishes a nitrogen-fixing symbiosis. This high-magnification image shows part of a cell with single bacteroids within their host plant. In this image, endoplasmic reticulum, dictysome, and cell wall can be seen.

Rhizobacteria are root-associated bacteria that can have a detrimental (parasitic varieties), neutral or beneficial effect on plant growth. The name comes from the Greek rhiza, meaning root. The term usually refers to bacteria that form symbiotic relationships with many plants (mutualism). Rhizobacteria are often referred to as plant growth-promoting rhizobacteria, or PGPRs. The term PGPRs was first used by Joseph W. Kloepper in the late 1970s and has become commonly used in scientific literature.

Generally, about 2–5% of rhizosphere bacteria are PGPR. They are an important group of microorganisms used in biofertilizer. Biofertilization accounts for about 65% of the nitrogen supply to crops worldwide. PGPR have different relationships with different species of host plants. The two major classes of relationships are rhizospheric and endophytic. Rhizospheric relationships consist of the PGPRs that colonize the surface of the root, or superficial intercellular spaces of the host plant, often forming root nodules. Endophytic relationships involve the PGPRs residing and growing within the host plant in the apoplastic space.

== Nitrogen fixation ==
Nitrogen fixation is one of the most beneficial processes performed by rhizobacteria. Nitrogen is a vital nutrient to plants and gaseous nitrogen (N_{2}) is not available to them due to the high energy required to break the triple bonds between the two atoms. Rhizobacteria, through nitrogen fixation, are able to convert gaseous nitrogen (N_{2}) to ammonia (NH_{3}) making it an available nutrient to the host plant which can support and enhance plant growth. The host plant provides the bacteria with amino acids so they do not need to assimilate ammonia. The amino acids are then shuttled back to the plant with newly fixed nitrogen. Nitrogenase is an enzyme involved in nitrogen fixation and requires anaerobic conditions. Membranes within root nodules are able to provide these conditions. The rhizobacteria require oxygen to metabolize, so oxygen is provided by a hemoglobin protein called leghemoglobin which is produced within the nodules. Legumes are well-known nitrogen-fixing crops and have been used for centuries in crop rotation to maintain the health of the soil.

== Symbiotic relationships ==
The symbiotic relationship between rhizobacteria and their host plants is not without costs. For the plant to be able to benefit from the added available nutrients provided by the rhizobacteria, it needs to provide a place and the proper conditions for the rhizobacteria to live. Creating and maintaining root nodules for rhizobacteria can cost between 12 and 25% of the plant's total photosynthetic output. Legumes are often able to colonize early successional environments due to the unavailability of nutrients. Once colonized, though, the rhizobacteria make the soil surrounding the plant more nutrient rich, which in turn can lead to competition with other plants. The symbiotic relationship, in short, can lead to increased competition.

PGPRs increase the availability of nutrients through the solubilization of unavailable forms of nutrients and by the production of siderophores which aids in the facilitating of nutrient transport. Phosphorus, a limiting nutrient for plant growth, can be plentiful in soil, but is most commonly found in insoluble forms. Organic acids and phosphotases released by rhizobacteria found in plant rhizospheres facilitate the conversion of insoluble forms of phosphorus to plant-available forms such as H_{2}PO_{4}^{−}. PGPR bacteria include Pseudomonas putida, Azospirillum fluorescens, and Azospirillum lipoferum and notable nitrogen-fixing bacteria associated with legumes includes Allorhizobium, Azorhizobium, Bradyrhizobium, and Rhizobium.

Though microbial inoculants can be beneficial for crops, they are not widely used in industrial agriculture, as large-scale application techniques have yet to become economically viable. A notable exception is the use of rhizobial inoculants for legumes such as peas. Inoculation with PGPRs ensures efficient nitrogen fixation, and they have been employed in North American agriculture for over 100 years.

== Plant growth-promoting rhizobacteria ==
Plant growth-promoting rhizobacteria (PGPR) were first defined by Kloepper and Schroth to be soil bacteria that colonize the roots of plants following inoculation onto seed and that enhance plant growth. The following are implicit in the colonization process: ability to survive inoculation onto seed, to multiply in the spermosphere (region surrounding the seed) in response to seed exudates, to attach to the root surface, and to colonize the developing root system. The ineffectiveness of PGPR in the field has often been attributed to their inability to colonize plant roots. A variety of bacterial traits and specific genes contribute to this process, but only a few have been identified. These include motility, chemotaxis to seed and root exudates, production of pili or fimbriae, production of specific cell surface components, ability to use specific components of root exudates, protein secretion, and quorum sensing. The generation of mutants altered in expression of these traits is aiding our understanding of the precise role each one plays in the colonization process.

Progress in the identification of new, previously uncharacterized genes is being made using unbiased screening strategies that rely on gene fusion technologies. These strategies employ reporter transposons and in vivo expression technology (IVET) to detect genes expressed during colonization.

Using molecular markers such as green fluorescent protein or fluorescent antibodies, it is possible to monitor the location of individual rhizobacteria on the root using confocal laser scanning microscopy. This approach has also been combined with an rRNA-targeting probe to monitor the metabolic activity of a rhizobacterial strain in the rhizosphere and showed that bacteria located at the root tip were most active.

=== Mechanisms of action ===
PGPRs enhance plant growth by direct and indirect means, but the specific mechanisms involved have not all been well characterized. Direct mechanisms of plant growth promotion by PGPRs can be demonstrated in the absence of plant pathogens or other rhizosphere microorganisms, while indirect mechanisms involve the ability of PGPRs to reduce the harmful effects of plant pathogens on crop yield. PGPRs have been reported to directly enhance plant growth by a variety of mechanisms:

- fixation of atmospheric nitrogen transferred to the plant,
- production of siderophores that chelate iron and make it available to the plant root
- solubilization of minerals such as phosphorus, and synthesis of phytohormones.

Direct enhancement of mineral uptake due to increases in specific ion fluxes at the root surface in the presence of PGPRs has also been reported. PGPR strains may use one or more of these mechanisms in the rhizosphere. Molecular approaches using microbial and plant mutants altered in their ability to synthesize or respond to specific phytohormones have increased understanding of the role of phytohormone synthesis as a direct mechanism of plant growth enhancement by PGPRs. PGPR that synthesize auxins, gibberellins and kinetins or that interfere with plant ethylene synthesis have been identified.

Development of PGPRs into biofertilisers and biopesticides could be a novel way of increasing crop yield and decreasing disease incidence, whilst decreasing dependency on chemical pesticides and fertilisers which can often have harmful effects on the local ecology and environment.

== Pathogenic roles ==
Studies conducted on sugar beet crops found that some root-colonizing bacteria were deleterious rhizobacteria (DRB). Sugar beet seeds inoculated with DRB had reduced germination rates, root lesions, reduced root elongation, root distortions, increased fungi infection, and decreased plant growth. In one trial the sugar beet yield was reduced by 48%.

Six strains of rhizobacteria have been identified as being DRB. The strains are in the genera Enterobacter, Klebsiella, Citrobacter, Flavobacterium, Achromobacter, and Arthrobacter. Due to a large number of taxonomic species yet to be described, complete characterization has not been possible as DRB are highly variable.

The presence of PGPRs has proven to reduce and inhibit the colonization of DRB on sugar beet roots. Plots inoculated with PGPRs and DRBs had an increase in production of 39% while plots only treated with DRBs had a reduction in production of 30%.

== Biocontrol ==
Rhizobacteria are also able to control plant diseases that are caused by other bacteria and fungi. Disease is suppressed through induced systemic resistance and through the production of antifungal metabolites. Pseudomonas biocontrol strains have been genetically modified to improve plant growth and improve the disease resistance of agricultural crops. In agriculture, inoculant bacteria are often applied to the seed coat of seeds prior to being sown. Inoculated seeds are more likely to establish large enough rhizobacterial populations within the rhizosphere to produce notable beneficial effects on the crop.

They can also combat pathogenic microbes in cattle. Different forage species regulate their own rhizosphere to varying degrees and favouring various microbes. Kyselková et al. 2015 find planting forage species known to encourage native rhizobacteria retards the spread within the soil of antibiotic resistance genes of cow faeces bacteria.

== See also ==
- endophyte
- endosymbiont
- symbiogenesis
- microbiota
- plant microbiome
- actinorrhiza
- Mycorrhiza
- Arbuscular mycorrhiza
- Common symbiosis signaling pathway
